= Felix Hormuth =

German astronomer

Minor planets discovered: 82
see § List of discovered minor planets

Felix Hormuth (born 1975) is a German astronomer who worked at the Max Planck Institute for Astronomy (MPIA) until 2016, and a prolific discoverer of minor planets. During his stay at the Calar Alto Observatory in Spain, he has discovered many asteroids, including a Jupiter trojan and two near-Earth objects, such as the 15-meter Amor asteroid 2009 DS_{36}, using MPIA's 1.23-meter reflector telescope.

== Career ==
Hormuth has worked with data obtained by the Infrared Space Observatory, was involved in the measurement campaign of the Very Large Telescope's GRAVITY-interferometer, and participated in the construction of optical instruments used at the NTT in La Silla, Chile. As of 2016, he is a project manager at MPIA, working for the Institute's hardware contribution to ESA's space-based Euclid mission, which will accurately measure the acceleration of the universe for the study of dark energy and dark matter.

The Minor Planet Center ranks him 127th for a total of 75 credited discoveries of numbered asteroid during 2003–2009. Hormuth has named his discovered main-belt asteroids 241475 Martinagedeck and 342843 Davidbowie after actors and songwriter Martina Gedeck and David Bowie, respectively. He has also named 18610 Arthurdent after the character in Douglas Adams's radio play and book The Hitchhiker's Guide to the Galaxy.

== Honors and awards ==
The asteroid 10660 Felixhormuth was named in his honor by astronomers Lothar Kurtze and Lutz Schmadel. The outer main-belt asteroid, provisionally designated 4348 T-1, was discovered by Dutch and Dutch–American astronomers during the Palomar–Leiden trojan survey in 1971. Based on an absolute magnitude of 13.9, it measures about 4 to 10 kilometers in diameter.

== List of discovered minor planets ==
189202 Calar Alto	17 September 2003	list
196640 Mulhacén	17 September 2003	list
202736 Julietclare	18 May 2007	list
209083 Rioja	17 September 2003	list
210432 Dietmarhopp	8 December 2008	list
210433 Ullithiele	21 December 2008	list
210444 Frithjof	16 January 2009	list
212991 Garcíalorca	23 February 2009	list
215044 Joãoalves	20 February 2009	list
(228124) 2008 YC_{7}	23 December 2008	list
239672 SOFIA	21 December 2008	list
241475 Martinagedeck	25 January 2009	list
241509 Sessler	22 February 2009	list
246759 Elviracheca	11 February 2009	list
(246810) 2009 FH_{73}	23 March 2009	list
257234 Güntherkurtze	26 February 2009	list
281764 Schwetzingen	24 February 2009	list
(283167) 2009 DN_{26}	22 February 2009	list
(284873) 2009 DN_{37}	23 February 2009	list
293934 MPIA	8 October 2007	list
(295957) 2008 YB_{4}	22 December 2008	list
(296208) 2009 CG_{5}	13 February 2009	list
(296256) 2009 DB_{28}	22 February 2009	list
(301393) 2009 DB_{29}	23 February 2009	list
(301405) 2009 DE_{37}	23 February 2009	list

(301435) 2009 DE_{73}	25 February 2009	list
305660 Romyhaag	29 January 2009	list
305661 Joejackson	29 January 2009	list
(305749) 2009 DF_{5}	20 February 2009	list
(305763) 2009 DW_{30}	23 February 2009	list
(305768) 2009 DU_{37}	23 February 2009	list
342843 Davidbowie	21 December 2008	list
(342844) 2008 YA_{4}	22 December 2008	list
(342960) 2009 BP	16 January 2009	list
(343094) 2009 DT_{37}	23 February 2009	list
(346654) 2008 YT	19 December 2008	list
(346807) 2009 CZ_{19}	15 February 2009	list
(346835) 2009 DH_{27}	22 February 2009	list
(349767) 2009 BD_{1}	17 January 2009	list
(352881) 2008 YO_{3}	21 December 2008	list
(356058) 2009 DK_{27}	22 February 2009	list
359103 Ottopiene	16 January 2009	list
(362128) 2009 DC_{29}	23 February 2009	list
(362148) 2009 DS_{111}	26 February 2009	list
(362186) 2009 FF_{67}	19 March 2009	list
365130 Birnfeld	23 February 2009	list
365131 Hassberge	23 February 2009	list
365159 Garching	26 February 2009	list
(375672) 2009 FS_{65}	19 March 2009	list
(384225) 2009 DP_{26}	22 February 2009	list

(386528) 2009 CB_{5}	12 February 2009	list
(386543) 2009 DZ_{2}	17 February 2009	list
(389209) 2009 DR_{27}	22 February 2009	list
(391982) 2008 YK	18 December 2008	list
(392077) 2009 DS_{26}	22 February 2009	list
(394976) 2009 AK_{16}	15 January 2009	list
(395046) 2009 DZ_{111}	26 February 2009	list
(414427) 2009 DU_{29}	23 February 2009	list
(414450) 2009 FJ_{73}	23 March 2009	list
(418924) 2009 CO_{39}	14 February 2009	list
(425011) 2009 DC_{112}	26 February 2009	list
(425023) 2009 FL_{22}	19 March 2009	list
429031 Hannavonhoerner	11 February 2009	list
429032 Sebvonhoerner	12 February 2009	list
429033 Günterwendt	13 February 2009	list
431397 Carolinregina	14 April 2007	list
435950 Bad Königshofen	21 February 2009	list
(435955) 2009 DU_{30}	23 February 2009	list
(435957) 2009 DT_{38}	24 February 2009	list
(445202) 2009 DG_{73}	25 February 2009	list
(448292) 2009 BH_{14}	24 January 2009	list
456731 Uligrözinger	8 October 2007	list
(457648) 2009 CE_{5}	13 February 2009	list
(462562) 2009 DH_{28}	22 February 2009	list
(468675) 2009 DB_{3}	17 February 2009	list

(477032) 2009 AT_{15}	15 January 2009	list
(477133) 2009 DY_{2}	17 February 2009	list
(477135) 2009 DM_{10}	21 February 2009	list
(490338) 2009 DV_{26}	22 February 2009	list
(509904) 2009 DB_{30}	23 February 2009	list
(513477) 2009 DR_{26}	22 February 2009	list
(528696) 2008 YT_{4}	22 December 2008	list
(542761) 2013 HP_{76}	15 April 2013	list
(543326) 2013 YL_{107}	12 February 2009	list^{[A]}
(545095) 2014 YQ_{38}	3 September 2013	list
(554434) 2012 TP_{266}	25 February 2009	list
55522 Claraisabella	4 September 2013	list
(558403) 2015 AG_{144}	3 September 2013	list
(559816) 2015 DS_{234}	23 March 2009	list
(564092) 2016 FW_{26}	3 September 2013	list
(564274) 2016 GU_{59}	27 August 2013	list
(573153) 2008 YW_{37}	23 December 2008	list
(573334) 2009 CO_{4}	12 February 2009	list^{[A]}
(573375) 2009 DG_{29}	23 February 2009	list
(573391) 2009 DH_{73}	25 February 2009	list
(575524) 2011 UP_{67}	13 February 2009	list^{[A]}
(577642) 2013 JB_{24}	9 May 2013	list
(577841) 2013 RV_{98}	3 September 2013	list
(578687) 2014 EE_{170}	19 March 2009	list
(578705) 2014 EO_{232}	23 March 2009	list

(580342) 2015 BH_{293}	3 September 2013	list
(583223) 2016 EB_{246}	3 September 2013	list
(588946) 2008 YC_{4}	22 December 2008	list
(589076) 2009 DA_{10}	20 February 2009	list
(589087) 2009 DF_{67}	24 February 2009	list
(589103) 2009 DW_{148}	26 February 2009	list
(589307) 2009 SR_{375}	4 September 2013	list
(590154) 2011 QF_{37}	24 February 2009	list
(591434) 2013 RY_{98}	3 September 2013	list
(592565) 2015 AK_{289}	3 September 2013	list
(595491) 2003 AB_{93}	1 January 2003	list
(598646) 2008 YR	19 December 2008	list
(598810) 2009 DQ_{114}	26 February 2009	list
59885 Agerer	26 February 2009	list
(600286) 2011 SD_{253}	19 March 2009	list
(600536) 2012 BL_{20}	19 March 2009	list
(605233) 2016 EG_{161}	26 February 2009	list
(614306) 2008 YS	19 December 2008	list
(614307) 2008 YT_{3}	21 December 2008	list
(614389) 2009 DQ_{27}	22 February 2009	list
(614390) 2009 DV_{30}	23 February 2009	list
(614402) 2009 DL_{114}	25 February 2009	list
617080 Nögel	1 January 2003	list
(621079) 2007 RA_{342}	3 September 2013	list
(622424) 2013 TD_{150}	4 September 2013	list

(627623) 2009 DR_{29}	23 February 2009	list
(633095) 2009 DL_{28}	23 February 2009	list
(633096) 2009 DO_{30}	23 February 2009	list
(633125) 2009 DT_{111}	26 February 2009	list
(633126) 2009 DB_{112}	26 February 2009	list
(634527) 2011 UB_{182}	20 February 2009	list
(635503) 2013 RL_{137}	3 September 2013	list
(636518) 2014 SL_{355}	16 April 2013	list
(636911) 2015 AM_{135}	30 January 2009	list
(647811) 2008 YL	19 December 2008	list
(648028) 2009 DW_{27}	22 February 2009	list
(652080) 2013 SC_{88}	3 September 2013	list
(657019) 2016 GY_{72}	3 September 2013	list
(665281) 2009 DV_{29}	23 February 2009	list
(665282) 2009 DL_{30}	23 February 2009	list
(665286) 2009 DZ_{37}	23 February 2009	list
(667824) 2011 SC_{254}	26 February 2009	list
(676473) 2016 GL_{207}	19 March 2009	list
(678218) 2017 PY_{12}	3 September 2013	list
(680518) 2002 ON_{36}	12 February 2009	list^{[A]}
(684906) 2008 YZ_{191}	23 December 2008	list
(685046) 2009 DG_{5}	20 February 2009	list
(685050) 2009 DX_{28}	23 February 2009	list
(685052) 2009 DW_{36}	23 February 2009	list
(685053) 2009 DJ_{38}	24 February 2009	list

(685071) 2009 DP_{114}	26 February 2009	list
(689937) 2013 TQ_{10}	3 September 2013	list
(691582) 2014 QS_{233}	8 May 2013	list
(705463) 2009 BV_{193}	26 December 2008	list
(705545) 2009 DT_{27}	22 February 2009	list
(705546) 2009 DE_{29}	23 February 2009	list
(705549) 2009 DU_{36}	23 February 2009	list
(709000) 2012 TX_{155}	12 February 2009	list^{[A]}
(709352) 2013 AA_{47}	21 February 2009	list
(709830) 2013 GW_{135}	15 April 2013	list
(710269) 2013 RO_{87}	3 September 2013	list
(714294) 2015 MH_{6}	23 February 2009	list
(714850) 2015 RZ_{43}	22 February 2009	list^{[A]}
(717697) 2016 WW_{55}	25 February 2009	list
(721152) 2003 AF_{93}	1 January 2003	list
721153 Gunda	7 January 2003	list
721154 Heinz	7 January 2003	list
(721672) 2003 YP_{178}	18 December 2003	list
(723833) 2007 PO_{51}	4 September 2013	list
(725467) 2008 YZ_{3}	22 December 2008	list
(725580) 2009 BR	16 January 2009	list
(725679) 2009 CC_{5}	12 February 2009	list^{[A]}
(725729) 2009 DF_{27}	22 February 2009	list
(725730) 2009 DS_{27}	22 February 2009	list
(725732) 2009 DZ_{28}	23 February 2009	list

(725733) 2009 DH_{30}	23 February 2009	list
(725827) 2009 FV_{67}	23 March 2009	list
(729911) 2011 SG_{226}	25 February 2009	list
(731198) 2013 BO_{79}	23 December 2008	list
(731824) 2013 RR_{131}	3 September 2013	list
(731933) 2013 TX_{108}	3 September 2013	list
(737253) 2016 AE_{266}	27 August 2013	list
(738060) 2016 GR_{109}	3 September 2013	list
(743875) 2008 YF_{2}	22 December 2008	list
(744145) 2009 DN_{5}	20 February 2009	list
(744151) 2009 DA_{28}	22 February 2009	list
(744152) 2009 DO_{28}	23 February 2009	list
(744153) 2009 DC_{30}	23 February 2009	list
(747925) 2013 CT_{80}	23 February 2009	list
(748199) 2013 HR_{76}	15 April 2013	list
(748403) 2013 QB_{61}	27 August 2013	list
(748642) 2013 TL_{138}	4 September 2013	list
(749277) 2014 HR_{62}	23 February 2009	list
(749654) 2014 OV_{43}	24 February 2009	list
(760781) 2009 BF_{1}	17 January 2009	list
(760929) 2009 DA_{29}	23 February 2009	list
(760930) 2009 DH_{38}	24 February 2009	list
(760937) 2009 DB_{73}	25 February 2009	list
(761050) 2009 GU_{8}	5 April 2009	list
(768125) 2015 BU_{174}	3 September 2013	list

(770758) 2016 BA_{98}	27 August 2013	list
(773751) 2021 CC_{46}	3 September 2013	list
(774081) 2001 FJ_{211}	23 February 2009	list
(777405) 2008 YP_{3}	21 December 2008	list
(777575) 2009 CD_{5}	12 February 2009	list^{[A]}
(777576) 2009 CD_{6}	13 February 2009	list^{[A]}
(777610) 2009 DB	16 February 2009	list^{[A]}
(777611) 2009 DY_{4}	20 February 2009	list
(777612) 2009 DZ_{9}	20 February 2009	list
(777613) 2009 DB_{10}	20 February 2009	list
(777614) 2009 DO_{10}	21 February 2009	list
(777615) 2009 DR_{10}	21 February 2009	list
(777617) 2009 DZ_{26}	22 February 2009	list
(781411) 2013 HB_{135}	14 April 2013	list
(781478) 2013 LF_{22}	10 May 2013	list
(781698) 2013 RW_{26}	4 September 2013	list
(782391) 2014 DN_{151}	23 February 2009	list
(782984) 2014 NH_{71}	26 February 2009	list
(784439) 2015 BO_{343}	3 September 2013	list
(788155) 2016 QS	22 February 2009	list
(788590) 2017 CQ_{14}	24 February 2009	list
(796085) 2009 DO_{27}	22 February 2009	list
(799278) 2013 GA_{149}	14 April 2013	list
(799629) 2013 RT_{110}	3 September 2013	list
(804515) 2016 AA_{47}	26 February 2009	list

(812206) 2004 DH_{1}	18 February 2004	list
(814922) 2009 DV_{37}	23 February 2009	list
(820918) 2015 BR_{115}	25 February 2009	list
(821220) 2015 DT_{193}	3 September 2013	list
(823864) 2016 OC_{7}	13 February 2009	list^{[A]}
(834671) 2010 RB_{206}	14 April 2013	list
(837317) 2013 GV_{167}	14 April 2013	list
(837592) 2013 QJ_{82}	28 August 2013	list
(837618) 2013 RT_{26}	4 September 2013	list
(837624) 2013 RN_{58}	3 September 2013	list
(848448) 2003 YN_{178}	18 December 2003	list
(853111) 2008 YX_{3}	22 December 2008	list
(853352) 2009 DW_{29}	23 February 2009	list
(853353) 2009 DV_{36}	23 February 2009	list
(853355) 2009 DR_{43}	24 February 2009	list
(859179) 2013 HE_{83}	15 April 2013	list
(859244) 2013 HN_{167}	16 April 2013	list
(859698) 2013 RD_{27}	4 September 2013	list
(859719) 2013 RP_{81}	1 January 2003	list
(859754) 2013 RP_{125}	3 September 2013	list
(859775) 2013 RQ_{135}	3 September 2013	list
(859793) 2013 RY_{151}	4 September 2013	list
(859838) 2013 SF_{85}	3 September 2013	list
(860002) 2013 TT_{234}	3 September 2013	list
(871317) 2017 QB_{18}	2 September 2013	list

(876886) 2009 AS_{15}	15 January 2009	list
(879185) 2013 RT_{116}	4 September 2013	list
(883786) 2016 UC_{72}	23 February 2009	list
Co-discovery made with:^{A} J. C. Datson

== See also ==
- List of minor planet discoverers § F. Hormuth
