= List of minor planets: 744001–745000 =

The following is a partial list of minor planets, running from minor-planet number 744001 through 745000, inclusive. The primary data for this and other partial lists is based on JPL's "Small-Body Orbital Elements" and data available from the Minor Planet Center. Critical list information is also provided by the MPC, unless otherwise specified from Lowell Observatory. A detailed description of the table's columns and additional sources are given on the main page including a complete list of every page in this series, and a statistical break-up on the dynamical classification of minor planets.

Also see the summary list of all named bodies in numerical and alphabetical order, and the corresponding naming citations for the number range of this particular list. New namings may only be added to this list after official publication, as the preannouncement of names is condemned by the Working Group for Small Bodies Nomenclature of the International Astronomical Union.

Near-Earth obj.	MBA (inner)	MBA (outer)	Centaur
Mars-crosser	MBA (middle)	Jupiter trojan	Trans-Neptunian obj.
Unclassified

== 744001–744100 ==
Designation			Discovery			Properties		Ref
Permanent	Provisional	Named after	Date	Site	Discoverer(s)	Category	Diam.	Ref
744001	2009 BD_{16}	—	January 16, 2009	Mount Lemmon	Mount Lemmon Survey	·	1.1 km	MPC · JPL
744002	2009 BY_{20}	—	January 16, 2009	Mount Lemmon	Mount Lemmon Survey	·	2.0 km	MPC · JPL
744003	2009 BS_{22}	—	January 17, 2009	Kitt Peak	Spacewatch	·	2.3 km	MPC · JPL
744004	2009 BW_{24}	—	December 31, 2008	Mount Lemmon	Mount Lemmon Survey	·	600 m	MPC · JPL
744005	2009 BR_{25}	—	December 31, 2008	Kitt Peak	Spacewatch	·	1.4 km	MPC · JPL
744006	2009 BZ_{25}	—	December 29, 2008	Mount Lemmon	Mount Lemmon Survey	·	830 m	MPC · JPL
744007	2009 BZ_{34}	—	January 1, 2009	Mount Lemmon	Mount Lemmon Survey	·	940 m	MPC · JPL
744008	2009 BT_{39}	—	January 16, 2009	Kitt Peak	Spacewatch	NYS	1.1 km	MPC · JPL
744009	2009 BZ_{42}	—	January 16, 2009	Kitt Peak	Spacewatch	DOR	2.0 km	MPC · JPL
744010	2009 BU_{45}	—	January 16, 2009	Kitt Peak	Spacewatch	·	1.1 km	MPC · JPL
744011	2009 BG_{47}	—	January 1, 2009	Mount Lemmon	Mount Lemmon Survey	·	1.1 km	MPC · JPL
744012	2009 BC_{52}	—	January 16, 2009	Mount Lemmon	Mount Lemmon Survey	·	710 m	MPC · JPL
744013	2009 BK_{54}	—	January 16, 2009	Mount Lemmon	Mount Lemmon Survey	·	2.8 km	MPC · JPL
744014	2009 BA_{57}	—	December 31, 2008	Kitt Peak	Spacewatch	·	1.1 km	MPC · JPL
744015	2009 BK_{63}	—	January 1, 2009	Kitt Peak	Spacewatch	·	2.0 km	MPC · JPL
744016	2009 BB_{64}	—	January 20, 2009	Catalina	CSS	(5)	1.0 km	MPC · JPL
744017	2009 BP_{65}	—	December 31, 2008	Mount Lemmon	Mount Lemmon Survey	(5)	970 m	MPC · JPL
744018	2009 BO_{66}	—	January 20, 2009	Kitt Peak	Spacewatch	·	600 m	MPC · JPL
744019	2009 BO_{71}	—	January 1, 2009	Kitt Peak	Spacewatch	·	1.1 km	MPC · JPL
744020	2009 BV_{71}	—	January 25, 2009	Kitt Peak	Spacewatch	JUN	830 m	MPC · JPL
744021	2009 BK_{74}	—	January 18, 2009	Catalina	CSS	·	1.7 km	MPC · JPL
744022	2009 BD_{75}	—	January 20, 2009	Catalina	CSS	·	1.9 km	MPC · JPL
744023	2009 BS_{75}	—	December 29, 2008	Kitt Peak	Spacewatch	·	1.7 km	MPC · JPL
744024	2009 BE_{78}	—	January 1, 2009	Mount Lemmon	Mount Lemmon Survey	LIX	2.3 km	MPC · JPL
744025	2009 BM_{78}	—	January 1, 2009	Kitt Peak	Spacewatch	·	680 m	MPC · JPL
744026	2009 BE_{82}	—	January 20, 2009	Catalina	CSS	·	1.4 km	MPC · JPL
744027	2009 BJ_{82}	—	January 20, 2009	Catalina	CSS	·	3.1 km	MPC · JPL
744028	2009 BX_{82}	—	November 1, 2008	Mount Lemmon	Mount Lemmon Survey	·	1.5 km	MPC · JPL
744029	2009 BQ_{83}	—	January 20, 2009	Kitt Peak	Spacewatch	·	1.4 km	MPC · JPL
744030	2009 BD_{84}	—	January 31, 2009	Kitt Peak	Spacewatch	·	1.1 km	MPC · JPL
744031	2009 BH_{95}	—	January 26, 2009	Mount Lemmon	Mount Lemmon Survey	·	3.4 km	MPC · JPL
744032	2009 BO_{95}	—	December 31, 2008	Kitt Peak	Spacewatch	·	2.8 km	MPC · JPL
744033	2009 BU_{95}	—	January 26, 2009	Mount Lemmon	Mount Lemmon Survey	·	570 m	MPC · JPL
744034	2009 BB_{100}	—	January 28, 2009	Kitt Peak	Spacewatch	EUN	830 m	MPC · JPL
744035	2009 BE_{112}	—	December 22, 2008	Kitt Peak	Spacewatch	·	1.1 km	MPC · JPL
744036	2009 BC_{116}	—	December 31, 2008	Kitt Peak	Spacewatch	HNS	900 m	MPC · JPL
744037	2009 BM_{117}	—	January 29, 2009	Mount Lemmon	Mount Lemmon Survey	·	570 m	MPC · JPL
744038	2009 BS_{117}	—	January 29, 2009	Mount Lemmon	Mount Lemmon Survey	·	2.8 km	MPC · JPL
744039	2009 BN_{119}	—	December 30, 2008	Mount Lemmon	Mount Lemmon Survey	·	2.4 km	MPC · JPL
744040	2009 BZ_{119}	—	January 20, 2009	Kitt Peak	Spacewatch	·	520 m	MPC · JPL
744041	2009 BC_{120}	—	January 30, 2009	Kitt Peak	Spacewatch	·	1.5 km	MPC · JPL
744042	2009 BG_{121}	—	January 31, 2009	Kitt Peak	Spacewatch	·	500 m	MPC · JPL
744043	2009 BM_{122}	—	January 31, 2009	Kitt Peak	Spacewatch	H	510 m	MPC · JPL
744044	2009 BV_{128}	—	January 18, 2009	Kitt Peak	Spacewatch	·	1.1 km	MPC · JPL
744045	2009 BJ_{132}	—	January 3, 2009	Mount Lemmon	Mount Lemmon Survey	·	2.1 km	MPC · JPL
744046	2009 BL_{132}	—	January 3, 2009	Mount Lemmon	Mount Lemmon Survey	(5)	780 m	MPC · JPL
744047	2009 BG_{133}	—	January 15, 2009	Kitt Peak	Spacewatch	·	2.5 km	MPC · JPL
744048	2009 BN_{137}	—	January 29, 2009	Kitt Peak	Spacewatch	·	2.5 km	MPC · JPL
744049	2009 BH_{139}	—	January 29, 2009	Kitt Peak	Spacewatch	MAS	570 m	MPC · JPL
744050	2009 BN_{139}	—	January 29, 2009	Kitt Peak	Spacewatch	·	790 m	MPC · JPL
744051	2009 BB_{141}	—	February 9, 2005	Mount Lemmon	Mount Lemmon Survey	·	730 m	MPC · JPL
744052	2009 BP_{141}	—	January 30, 2009	Kitt Peak	Spacewatch	·	1.4 km	MPC · JPL
744053	2009 BF_{148}	—	January 30, 2009	Mount Lemmon	Mount Lemmon Survey	·	1.3 km	MPC · JPL
744054	2009 BB_{154}	—	January 2, 2009	Mount Lemmon	Mount Lemmon Survey	·	2.6 km	MPC · JPL
744055	2009 BD_{155}	—	December 30, 2008	Mount Lemmon	Mount Lemmon Survey	·	2.4 km	MPC · JPL
744056	2009 BS_{156}	—	January 31, 2009	Kitt Peak	Spacewatch	·	1.1 km	MPC · JPL
744057	2009 BB_{161}	—	January 31, 2009	Mount Lemmon	Mount Lemmon Survey	·	2.5 km	MPC · JPL
744058	2009 BD_{161}	—	January 18, 2009	Kitt Peak	Spacewatch	EOS	1.7 km	MPC · JPL
744059	2009 BC_{164}	—	January 31, 2009	Kitt Peak	Spacewatch	·	2.8 km	MPC · JPL
744060	2009 BO_{169}	—	January 16, 2009	Mount Lemmon	Mount Lemmon Survey	EOS	1.7 km	MPC · JPL
744061	2009 BS_{171}	—	January 17, 2009	Kitt Peak	Spacewatch	·	1.3 km	MPC · JPL
744062	2009 BY_{173}	—	January 25, 2009	Kitt Peak	Spacewatch	·	1.3 km	MPC · JPL
744063	2009 BE_{176}	—	January 31, 2009	Mount Lemmon	Mount Lemmon Survey	·	2.7 km	MPC · JPL
744064	2009 BR_{179}	—	January 18, 2009	Kitt Peak	Spacewatch	·	1.2 km	MPC · JPL
744065	2009 BQ_{181}	—	January 20, 2009	Catalina	CSS	JUN	700 m	MPC · JPL
744066	2009 BJ_{184}	—	February 1, 2005	Kitt Peak	Spacewatch	·	830 m	MPC · JPL
744067	2009 BP_{185}	—	January 20, 2009	Mount Lemmon	Mount Lemmon Survey	·	2.6 km	MPC · JPL
744068	2009 BV_{187}	—	January 31, 2009	Kitt Peak	Spacewatch	·	2.7 km	MPC · JPL
744069	2009 BP_{188}	—	January 31, 2009	Kitt Peak	Spacewatch	·	1.6 km	MPC · JPL
744070	2009 BU_{192}	—	January 31, 2009	Kitt Peak	Spacewatch	·	2.3 km	MPC · JPL
744071	2009 BS_{194}	—	December 25, 2013	Mount Lemmon	Mount Lemmon Survey	·	1.6 km	MPC · JPL
744072	2009 BE_{196}	—	January 25, 2009	Kitt Peak	Spacewatch	·	1.4 km	MPC · JPL
744073	2009 BK_{196}	—	January 16, 2015	Haleakala	Pan-STARRS 1	TIR	2.6 km	MPC · JPL
744074	2009 BY_{196}	—	February 27, 2014	Haleakala	Pan-STARRS 1	AEO	820 m	MPC · JPL
744075	2009 BQ_{197}	—	January 31, 2009	Mount Lemmon	Mount Lemmon Survey	·	1.2 km	MPC · JPL
744076	2009 BU_{197}	—	February 1, 2013	Haleakala	Pan-STARRS 1	·	1.4 km	MPC · JPL
744077	2009 BU_{198}	—	October 6, 2008	Mount Lemmon	Mount Lemmon Survey	·	2.7 km	MPC · JPL
744078	2009 BG_{199}	—	May 16, 2014	Haleakala	Pan-STARRS 1	·	1.6 km	MPC · JPL
744079	2009 BQ_{199}	—	January 20, 2009	Mount Lemmon	Mount Lemmon Survey	·	1.1 km	MPC · JPL
744080	2009 BU_{199}	—	February 5, 2016	Haleakala	Pan-STARRS 1	TIR	2.5 km	MPC · JPL
744081	2009 BY_{199}	—	January 20, 2009	Kitt Peak	Spacewatch	·	2.8 km	MPC · JPL
744082	2009 BB_{200}	—	January 31, 2009	Mount Lemmon	Mount Lemmon Survey	·	2.5 km	MPC · JPL
744083	2009 BD_{200}	—	November 19, 2016	Mount Lemmon	Mount Lemmon Survey	·	1.2 km	MPC · JPL
744084	2009 BH_{200}	—	August 26, 2012	Haleakala	Pan-STARRS 1	·	1.7 km	MPC · JPL
744085	2009 BU_{200}	—	July 27, 2011	Haleakala	Pan-STARRS 1	·	1.2 km	MPC · JPL
744086	2009 BJ_{201}	—	September 16, 2012	Mount Lemmon	Mount Lemmon Survey	EOS	1.5 km	MPC · JPL
744087	2009 BH_{202}	—	July 5, 2017	Haleakala	Pan-STARRS 1	EOS	1.4 km	MPC · JPL
744088	2009 BW_{202}	—	October 4, 2013	Kitt Peak	Spacewatch	·	2.8 km	MPC · JPL
744089	2009 BX_{202}	—	January 29, 2009	Mount Lemmon	Mount Lemmon Survey	EUP	2.8 km	MPC · JPL
744090	2009 BA_{203}	—	September 27, 2011	Mount Lemmon	Mount Lemmon Survey	MAR	920 m	MPC · JPL
744091	2009 BB_{204}	—	January 28, 2015	Haleakala	Pan-STARRS 1	·	2.6 km	MPC · JPL
744092	2009 BJ_{204}	—	November 19, 2014	Mount Lemmon	Mount Lemmon Survey	·	3.0 km	MPC · JPL
744093	2009 BM_{204}	—	January 4, 2014	Kitt Peak	Spacewatch	EOS	1.7 km	MPC · JPL
744094	2009 BN_{204}	—	January 30, 2009	Mount Lemmon	Mount Lemmon Survey	·	2.3 km	MPC · JPL
744095	2009 BE_{205}	—	January 31, 2009	Kitt Peak	Spacewatch	·	2.5 km	MPC · JPL
744096	2009 BD_{206}	—	January 31, 2009	Kitt Peak	Spacewatch	·	2.4 km	MPC · JPL
744097	2009 BH_{206}	—	January 19, 2009	Mount Lemmon	Mount Lemmon Survey	·	1.0 km	MPC · JPL
744098	2009 BO_{207}	—	January 31, 2009	Mount Lemmon	Mount Lemmon Survey	H	400 m	MPC · JPL
744099	2009 BV_{209}	—	January 30, 2009	Mount Lemmon	Mount Lemmon Survey	(194)	1.4 km	MPC · JPL
744100	2009 BB_{210}	—	January 29, 2009	Mount Lemmon	Mount Lemmon Survey	·	2.5 km	MPC · JPL

== 744101–744200 ==
back to top

Designation			Discovery			Properties		Ref
Permanent	Provisional	Named after	Date	Site	Discoverer(s)	Category	Diam.	Ref
744101	2009 BA_{213}	—	January 18, 2009	Mount Lemmon	Mount Lemmon Survey	EUN	1.0 km	MPC · JPL
744102	2009 BW_{214}	—	January 17, 2009	Kitt Peak	Spacewatch	ADE	1.5 km	MPC · JPL
744103	2009 CC_{3}	—	February 4, 2009	Siding Spring	SSS	AMO · PHA	540 m	MPC · JPL
744104	2009 CH_{3}	—	December 30, 2008	Mount Lemmon	Mount Lemmon Survey	JUN	870 m	MPC · JPL
744105	2009 CH_{5}	—	January 18, 2009	Mount Lemmon	Mount Lemmon Survey	·	2.1 km	MPC · JPL
744106	2009 CM_{5}	—	February 3, 2009	Kitt Peak	Spacewatch	H	410 m	MPC · JPL
744107	2009 CT_{8}	—	October 30, 2008	Kitt Peak	Spacewatch	·	2.1 km	MPC · JPL
744108	2009 CB_{9}	—	March 10, 2005	Moletai	K. Černis, Zdanavicius, J.	EUN	1.2 km	MPC · JPL
744109	2009 CH_{23}	—	February 1, 2009	Kitt Peak	Spacewatch	·	2.3 km	MPC · JPL
744110	2009 CG_{26}	—	February 1, 2009	Kitt Peak	Spacewatch	·	1.2 km	MPC · JPL
744111	2009 CP_{34}	—	February 2, 2009	Mount Lemmon	Mount Lemmon Survey	(5)	920 m	MPC · JPL
744112	2009 CR_{36}	—	January 20, 2009	Kitt Peak	Spacewatch	EUN	1 km	MPC · JPL
744113	2009 CN_{38}	—	January 1, 2009	Kitt Peak	Spacewatch	·	2.6 km	MPC · JPL
744114	2009 CB_{43}	—	October 11, 2007	Catalina	CSS	NEM	1.9 km	MPC · JPL
744115	2009 CH_{43}	—	February 14, 2009	Kitt Peak	Spacewatch	·	880 m	MPC · JPL
744116	2009 CV_{43}	—	February 1, 2009	Kitt Peak	Spacewatch	H	360 m	MPC · JPL
744117	2009 CK_{44}	—	October 8, 2008	Mount Lemmon	Mount Lemmon Survey	·	2.3 km	MPC · JPL
744118	2009 CE_{45}	—	February 11, 2002	Anderson Mesa	LONEOS	PHO	900 m	MPC · JPL
744119	2009 CY_{45}	—	January 7, 2009	Kitt Peak	Spacewatch	·	1.3 km	MPC · JPL
744120	2009 CB_{50}	—	January 20, 2009	Mount Lemmon	Mount Lemmon Survey	·	2.1 km	MPC · JPL
744121	2009 CN_{50}	—	January 1, 2009	Mount Lemmon	Mount Lemmon Survey	·	2.5 km	MPC · JPL
744122	2009 CX_{51}	—	January 3, 2009	Mount Lemmon	Mount Lemmon Survey	·	2.8 km	MPC · JPL
744123	2009 CZ_{51}	—	January 3, 2009	Mount Lemmon	Mount Lemmon Survey	RAF	740 m	MPC · JPL
744124	2009 CA_{52}	—	February 3, 2009	Kitt Peak	Spacewatch	·	1.3 km	MPC · JPL
744125	2009 CL_{55}	—	January 20, 2009	Catalina	CSS	BAR	900 m	MPC · JPL
744126	2009 CN_{57}	—	February 1, 2009	Kitt Peak	Spacewatch	THM	2.3 km	MPC · JPL
744127	2009 CT_{59}	—	February 14, 2009	Kitt Peak	Spacewatch	·	2.6 km	MPC · JPL
744128	2009 CW_{60}	—	February 13, 2009	Mount Lemmon	Mount Lemmon Survey	JUN	1.0 km	MPC · JPL
744129	2009 CU_{63}	—	February 1, 2009	Kitt Peak	Spacewatch	VER	2.2 km	MPC · JPL
744130	2009 CS_{67}	—	December 25, 2012	Oukaïmeden	M. Ory	·	1.2 km	MPC · JPL
744131	2009 CP_{68}	—	November 28, 2014	Kitt Peak	Spacewatch	·	510 m	MPC · JPL
744132	2009 CX_{68}	—	November 17, 2014	Mount Lemmon	Mount Lemmon Survey	·	710 m	MPC · JPL
744133	2009 CZ_{68}	—	July 4, 2016	Haleakala	Pan-STARRS 1	EOS	1.7 km	MPC · JPL
744134	2009 CP_{69}	—	February 3, 2009	Mount Lemmon	Mount Lemmon Survey	·	2.8 km	MPC · JPL
744135	2009 CB_{70}	—	October 11, 2015	Mount Lemmon	Mount Lemmon Survey	·	1.4 km	MPC · JPL
744136	2009 CP_{70}	—	May 27, 2014	Haleakala	Pan-STARRS 1	·	1.5 km	MPC · JPL
744137	2009 CA_{71}	—	February 1, 2009	Mount Lemmon	Mount Lemmon Survey	·	1.1 km	MPC · JPL
744138	2009 CF_{71}	—	February 10, 2014	Mount Lemmon	Mount Lemmon Survey	·	2.3 km	MPC · JPL
744139	2009 CZ_{71}	—	August 25, 2012	Kitt Peak	Spacewatch	EOS	1.6 km	MPC · JPL
744140	2009 CE_{72}	—	December 25, 2013	Mount Lemmon	Mount Lemmon Survey	·	2.5 km	MPC · JPL
744141	2009 CN_{75}	—	February 2, 2009	Kitt Peak	Spacewatch	·	2.2 km	MPC · JPL
744142	2009 CO_{76}	—	February 4, 2009	Mount Lemmon	Mount Lemmon Survey	·	1.4 km	MPC · JPL
744143	2009 DJ	—	December 1, 2008	Kitt Peak	Spacewatch	LIX	2.8 km	MPC · JPL
744144	2009 DY_{3}	—	January 29, 2009	Mount Lemmon	Mount Lemmon Survey	·	1.4 km	MPC · JPL
744145	2009 DN_{5}	—	February 20, 2009	Calar Alto	F. Hormuth	·	790 m	MPC · JPL
744146	2009 DP_{12}	—	January 18, 2009	Mount Lemmon	Mount Lemmon Survey	·	1.0 km	MPC · JPL
744147	2009 DR_{13}	—	February 16, 2009	Kitt Peak	Spacewatch	(895)	2.6 km	MPC · JPL
744148	2009 DM_{21}	—	January 20, 2009	Kitt Peak	Spacewatch	·	980 m	MPC · JPL
744149	2009 DR_{23}	—	February 20, 2009	Kitt Peak	Spacewatch	·	2.8 km	MPC · JPL
744150	2009 DX_{25}	—	February 21, 2009	Mount Lemmon	Mount Lemmon Survey	·	2.3 km	MPC · JPL
744151	2009 DA_{28}	—	February 22, 2009	Calar Alto	F. Hormuth	·	2.0 km	MPC · JPL
744152	2009 DO_{28}	—	February 23, 2009	Calar Alto	F. Hormuth	·	1.1 km	MPC · JPL
744153	2009 DC_{30}	—	February 23, 2009	Calar Alto	F. Hormuth	·	970 m	MPC · JPL
744154	2009 DW_{34}	—	February 20, 2009	Kitt Peak	Spacewatch	·	1.8 km	MPC · JPL
744155	2009 DE_{40}	—	February 20, 2009	Dauban	C. Rinner, Kugel, F.	·	830 m	MPC · JPL
744156	2009 DE_{44}	—	February 9, 2005	Mount Lemmon	Mount Lemmon Survey	·	1.0 km	MPC · JPL
744157	2009 DK_{48}	—	October 12, 2007	Kitt Peak	Spacewatch	·	2.6 km	MPC · JPL
744158	2009 DO_{48}	—	February 5, 2009	Mount Lemmon	Mount Lemmon Survey	T_{j} (2.97)	2.5 km	MPC · JPL
744159	2009 DM_{50}	—	February 19, 2009	Kitt Peak	Spacewatch	·	720 m	MPC · JPL
744160	2009 DS_{52}	—	December 31, 2008	Mount Lemmon	Mount Lemmon Survey	·	930 m	MPC · JPL
744161	2009 DD_{55}	—	February 22, 2009	Kitt Peak	Spacewatch	·	1.1 km	MPC · JPL
744162	2009 DR_{55}	—	February 22, 2009	Kitt Peak	Spacewatch	·	1.7 km	MPC · JPL
744163	2009 DE_{56}	—	February 22, 2009	Kitt Peak	Spacewatch	EOS	1.8 km	MPC · JPL
744164	2009 DS_{58}	—	February 22, 2009	Kitt Peak	Spacewatch	VER	2.1 km	MPC · JPL
744165	2009 DU_{61}	—	February 22, 2009	Kitt Peak	Spacewatch	·	2.1 km	MPC · JPL
744166	2009 DW_{68}	—	December 30, 2008	Mount Lemmon	Mount Lemmon Survey	·	2.5 km	MPC · JPL
744167	2009 DO_{83}	—	February 4, 2009	Mount Lemmon	Mount Lemmon Survey	EUN	990 m	MPC · JPL
744168	2009 DV_{89}	—	February 19, 2009	Kitt Peak	Spacewatch	H	370 m	MPC · JPL
744169	2009 DA_{93}	—	February 28, 2009	Mount Lemmon	Mount Lemmon Survey	·	570 m	MPC · JPL
744170	2009 DX_{96}	—	February 3, 2009	Moletai	K. Černis, Zdanavicius, J.	·	490 m	MPC · JPL
744171	2009 DU_{97}	—	February 26, 2009	Kitt Peak	Spacewatch	·	1.2 km	MPC · JPL
744172	2009 DC_{100}	—	February 26, 2009	Kitt Peak	Spacewatch	·	2.8 km	MPC · JPL
744173	2009 DN_{107}	—	September 10, 2007	Mount Lemmon	Mount Lemmon Survey	·	700 m	MPC · JPL
744174	2009 DO_{107}	—	February 28, 2009	Kitt Peak	Spacewatch	·	1.6 km	MPC · JPL
744175	2009 DV_{113}	—	February 19, 2009	Mount Lemmon	Mount Lemmon Survey	·	1.1 km	MPC · JPL
744176	2009 DR_{115}	—	February 26, 2009	Catalina	CSS	·	2.9 km	MPC · JPL
744177	2009 DB_{118}	—	February 27, 2009	Kitt Peak	Spacewatch	PHO	740 m	MPC · JPL
744178	2009 DJ_{120}	—	February 19, 2009	Kitt Peak	Spacewatch	T_{j} (2.89)	5.1 km	MPC · JPL
744179	2009 DC_{127}	—	February 20, 2009	Kitt Peak	Spacewatch	·	940 m	MPC · JPL
744180	2009 DJ_{129}	—	February 27, 2009	Kitt Peak	Spacewatch	HNS	920 m	MPC · JPL
744181	2009 DZ_{132}	—	February 27, 2009	Kitt Peak	Spacewatch	·	2.5 km	MPC · JPL
744182	2009 DF_{134}	—	February 28, 2009	Kitt Peak	Spacewatch	·	2.2 km	MPC · JPL
744183	2009 DZ_{134}	—	February 20, 2009	Kitt Peak	Spacewatch	·	2.5 km	MPC · JPL
744184	2009 DC_{136}	—	October 9, 2007	Kitt Peak	Spacewatch	·	1.4 km	MPC · JPL
744185	2009 DW_{137}	—	February 19, 2009	Kitt Peak	Spacewatch	·	830 m	MPC · JPL
744186	2009 DG_{145}	—	February 19, 2009	Kitt Peak	Spacewatch	THB	1.9 km	MPC · JPL
744187	2009 DK_{145}	—	February 20, 2009	Kitt Peak	Spacewatch	·	2.6 km	MPC · JPL
744188	2009 DP_{145}	—	February 28, 2009	Kitt Peak	Spacewatch	·	1.2 km	MPC · JPL
744189	2009 DJ_{146}	—	February 27, 2009	Mount Lemmon	Mount Lemmon Survey	PHO	890 m	MPC · JPL
744190	2009 DA_{147}	—	November 10, 2013	Mount Lemmon	Mount Lemmon Survey	H	420 m	MPC · JPL
744191	2009 DT_{147}	—	September 13, 2014	Haleakala	Pan-STARRS 1	·	540 m	MPC · JPL
744192	2009 DK_{148}	—	October 10, 2012	Mount Lemmon	Mount Lemmon Survey	·	2.6 km	MPC · JPL
744193	2009 DU_{148}	—	February 19, 2009	Kitt Peak	Spacewatch	ELF	2.6 km	MPC · JPL
744194	2009 DJ_{149}	—	February 19, 2009	Mount Lemmon	Mount Lemmon Survey	(2076)	720 m	MPC · JPL
744195	2009 DM_{149}	—	February 19, 2009	Mount Lemmon	Mount Lemmon Survey	H	440 m	MPC · JPL
744196	2009 DH_{150}	—	February 27, 2009	Mount Lemmon	Mount Lemmon Survey	·	1.2 km	MPC · JPL
744197	2009 DO_{150}	—	October 8, 2015	Haleakala	Pan-STARRS 1	·	930 m	MPC · JPL
744198	2009 DR_{150}	—	February 28, 2009	Mount Lemmon	Mount Lemmon Survey	·	2.3 km	MPC · JPL
744199	2009 DM_{152}	—	February 17, 2015	Haleakala	Pan-STARRS 1	·	2.6 km	MPC · JPL
744200	2009 DX_{153}	—	February 19, 2009	Kitt Peak	Spacewatch	·	630 m	MPC · JPL

== 744201–744300 ==
back to top

Designation			Discovery			Properties		Ref
Permanent	Provisional	Named after	Date	Site	Discoverer(s)	Category	Diam.	Ref
744201	2009 DO_{156}	—	February 20, 2009	Kitt Peak	Spacewatch	THM	1.9 km	MPC · JPL
744202	2009 DT_{156}	—	February 21, 2009	Mount Lemmon	Mount Lemmon Survey	(194)	1.4 km	MPC · JPL
744203	2009 DY_{157}	—	February 20, 2009	Kitt Peak	Spacewatch	·	2.9 km	MPC · JPL
744204	2009 DS_{158}	—	February 27, 2009	Kitt Peak	Spacewatch	EUN	850 m	MPC · JPL
744205	2009 EF_{7}	—	January 31, 2009	Mount Lemmon	Mount Lemmon Survey	·	690 m	MPC · JPL
744206	2009 EF_{9}	—	January 29, 2009	Kitt Peak	Spacewatch	T_{j} (2.98) · EUP	2.5 km	MPC · JPL
744207	2009 ER_{11}	—	January 18, 2009	Kitt Peak	Spacewatch	·	580 m	MPC · JPL
744208	2009 EY_{21}	—	March 21, 2009	Catalina	CSS	PHO	770 m	MPC · JPL
744209	2009 EJ_{24}	—	March 1, 2009	Mount Lemmon	Mount Lemmon Survey	(2076)	830 m	MPC · JPL
744210	2009 EY_{32}	—	March 3, 2009	Mount Lemmon	Mount Lemmon Survey	·	3.1 km	MPC · JPL
744211	2009 EG_{33}	—	August 28, 2014	Haleakala	Pan-STARRS 1	·	1.2 km	MPC · JPL
744212	2009 EK_{33}	—	March 2, 2009	Kitt Peak	Spacewatch	·	570 m	MPC · JPL
744213	2009 EP_{33}	—	January 24, 2014	Haleakala	Pan-STARRS 1	·	2.2 km	MPC · JPL
744214	2009 ER_{33}	—	July 31, 2016	Haleakala	Pan-STARRS 1	EOS	1.6 km	MPC · JPL
744215	2009 EW_{33}	—	December 31, 2011	Kitt Peak	Spacewatch	·	570 m	MPC · JPL
744216	2009 EK_{34}	—	March 2, 2016	Mount Lemmon	Mount Lemmon Survey	·	740 m	MPC · JPL
744217	2009 EO_{34}	—	March 15, 2009	Mount Lemmon	Mount Lemmon Survey	EUN	1.0 km	MPC · JPL
744218	2009 EV_{34}	—	April 18, 2015	Cerro Tololo	DECam	EOS	1.3 km	MPC · JPL
744219	2009 ED_{35}	—	March 1, 2009	Mount Lemmon	Mount Lemmon Survey	PHO	600 m	MPC · JPL
744220	2009 EP_{35}	—	October 24, 2011	Haleakala	Pan-STARRS 1	·	1.1 km	MPC · JPL
744221	2009 ED_{36}	—	October 15, 2017	Mount Lemmon	Mount Lemmon Survey	·	510 m	MPC · JPL
744222	2009 EN_{36}	—	March 22, 2015	Haleakala	Pan-STARRS 1	·	2.8 km	MPC · JPL
744223	2009 ET_{36}	—	August 10, 2007	Kitt Peak	Spacewatch	·	1.0 km	MPC · JPL
744224	2009 EN_{37}	—	March 2, 2009	Mount Lemmon	Mount Lemmon Survey	·	1.5 km	MPC · JPL
744225	2009 EW_{37}	—	November 6, 2016	Mount Lemmon	Mount Lemmon Survey	·	1.4 km	MPC · JPL
744226	2009 EG_{38}	—	July 28, 2012	Haleakala	Pan-STARRS 1	·	2.3 km	MPC · JPL
744227	2009 FR_{2}	—	September 11, 2007	Kitt Peak	Spacewatch	·	1.2 km	MPC · JPL
744228	2009 FX_{2}	—	March 18, 2009	Dauban	C. Rinner, Kugel, F.	·	550 m	MPC · JPL
744229	2009 FC_{6}	—	February 3, 2009	Kitt Peak	Spacewatch	·	2.5 km	MPC · JPL
744230	2009 FR_{6}	—	March 1, 2009	Kitt Peak	Spacewatch	EOS	1.6 km	MPC · JPL
744231	2009 FO_{13}	—	March 21, 2009	Catalina	CSS	·	600 m	MPC · JPL
744232	2009 FY_{22}	—	March 19, 2009	Kitt Peak	Spacewatch	T_{j} (2.98) · EUP	2.6 km	MPC · JPL
744233	2009 FT_{28}	—	April 26, 2000	Kitt Peak	Spacewatch	·	1.3 km	MPC · JPL
744234	2009 FG_{36}	—	March 2, 2009	Kitt Peak	Spacewatch	H	410 m	MPC · JPL
744235	2009 FR_{39}	—	January 31, 2009	Mount Lemmon	Mount Lemmon Survey	H	480 m	MPC · JPL
744236	2009 FZ_{42}	—	February 27, 2009	Mount Lemmon	Mount Lemmon Survey	·	1.2 km	MPC · JPL
744237	2009 FG_{45}	—	March 28, 2009	Mount Lemmon	Mount Lemmon Survey	JUN	1.0 km	MPC · JPL
744238	2009 FP_{53}	—	March 29, 2009	Mount Lemmon	Mount Lemmon Survey	·	1.5 km	MPC · JPL
744239	2009 FT_{53}	—	March 29, 2009	Mount Lemmon	Mount Lemmon Survey	VER	2.9 km	MPC · JPL
744240	2009 FY_{53}	—	March 21, 2009	Kitt Peak	Spacewatch	EUN	870 m	MPC · JPL
744241	2009 FM_{54}	—	March 17, 2009	Kitt Peak	Spacewatch	·	2.2 km	MPC · JPL
744242	2009 FU_{54}	—	March 30, 2009	Mount Lemmon	Mount Lemmon Survey	·	800 m	MPC · JPL
744243	2009 FO_{55}	—	March 31, 2009	Kitt Peak	Spacewatch	·	1.5 km	MPC · JPL
744244	2009 FN_{57}	—	April 20, 2009	Catalina	CSS	TIR	2.5 km	MPC · JPL
744245	2009 FW_{70}	—	March 24, 2009	Kitt Peak	Spacewatch	·	1.1 km	MPC · JPL
744246	2009 FR_{78}	—	March 25, 2009	Palomar	Palomar Transient Factory	T_{j} (2.99)	3.0 km	MPC · JPL
744247	2009 FU_{79}	—	January 30, 2009	Mount Lemmon	Mount Lemmon Survey	·	1.4 km	MPC · JPL
744248	2009 FA_{82}	—	September 23, 2011	Haleakala	Pan-STARRS 1	·	2.6 km	MPC · JPL
744249	2009 FD_{82}	—	March 28, 2009	Kitt Peak	Spacewatch	H	530 m	MPC · JPL
744250	2009 FL_{82}	—	January 2, 2012	Kitt Peak	Spacewatch	·	610 m	MPC · JPL
744251	2009 FB_{83}	—	March 28, 2009	Mount Lemmon	Mount Lemmon Survey	·	600 m	MPC · JPL
744252	2009 FJ_{83}	—	February 27, 2016	Mount Lemmon	Mount Lemmon Survey	·	770 m	MPC · JPL
744253	2009 FK_{83}	—	March 19, 2009	Kitt Peak	Spacewatch	·	770 m	MPC · JPL
744254	2009 FF_{84}	—	March 21, 2009	Kitt Peak	Spacewatch	V	570 m	MPC · JPL
744255	2009 FN_{84}	—	November 3, 2011	Kitt Peak	Spacewatch	·	1.4 km	MPC · JPL
744256	2009 FT_{84}	—	March 19, 2015	Haleakala	Pan-STARRS 1	EUP	2.8 km	MPC · JPL
744257	2009 FB_{86}	—	March 19, 2009	Mount Lemmon	Mount Lemmon Survey	·	660 m	MPC · JPL
744258	2009 FO_{86}	—	January 26, 2017	Mount Lemmon	Mount Lemmon Survey	·	1.3 km	MPC · JPL
744259	2009 FX_{86}	—	October 19, 2012	Haleakala	Pan-STARRS 1	EOS	1.7 km	MPC · JPL
744260	2009 FP_{87}	—	September 12, 2015	Haleakala	Pan-STARRS 1	·	1.3 km	MPC · JPL
744261	2009 FC_{88}	—	March 19, 2009	Kitt Peak	Spacewatch	NEM	2.0 km	MPC · JPL
744262	2009 FE_{89}	—	January 28, 2009	Catalina	CSS	·	3.1 km	MPC · JPL
744263	2009 FF_{90}	—	March 17, 2009	Kitt Peak	Spacewatch	TIR	2.4 km	MPC · JPL
744264	2009 FH_{90}	—	March 16, 2009	Kitt Peak	Spacewatch	·	2.4 km	MPC · JPL
744265	2009 FQ_{90}	—	March 19, 2009	Mount Lemmon	Mount Lemmon Survey	·	2.2 km	MPC · JPL
744266	2009 FR_{90}	—	March 19, 2009	Mount Lemmon	Mount Lemmon Survey	·	1.7 km	MPC · JPL
744267	2009 FV_{90}	—	March 28, 2009	Kitt Peak	Spacewatch	H	410 m	MPC · JPL
744268	2009 FF_{93}	—	March 21, 2009	Catalina	CSS	·	1.8 km	MPC · JPL
744269	2009 GC_{2}	—	April 13, 2009	Taunus	E. Schwab, R. Kling	·	1 km	MPC · JPL
744270	2009 GY_{6}	—	March 18, 2009	Kitt Peak	Spacewatch	·	560 m	MPC · JPL
744271	2009 GB_{7}	—	July 13, 2013	Haleakala	Pan-STARRS 1	·	670 m	MPC · JPL
744272	2009 GD_{8}	—	September 5, 2010	Mount Lemmon	Mount Lemmon Survey	H	400 m	MPC · JPL
744273	2009 GK_{8}	—	October 1, 2015	Mount Lemmon	Mount Lemmon Survey	·	1.5 km	MPC · JPL
744274	2009 HD_{1}	—	April 16, 2009	Catalina	CSS	·	1.9 km	MPC · JPL
744275	2009 HV_{6}	—	April 17, 2009	Kitt Peak	Spacewatch	·	620 m	MPC · JPL
744276	2009 HA_{15}	—	April 18, 2009	Kitt Peak	Spacewatch	·	630 m	MPC · JPL
744277	2009 HB_{16}	—	April 18, 2009	Kitt Peak	Spacewatch	EUN	960 m	MPC · JPL
744278	2009 HY_{17}	—	April 18, 2009	Kitt Peak	Spacewatch	·	1.7 km	MPC · JPL
744279	2009 HG_{18}	—	April 18, 2009	Mount Lemmon	Mount Lemmon Survey	THM	1.8 km	MPC · JPL
744280	2009 HY_{20}	—	April 20, 2009	Kitt Peak	Spacewatch	NYS	690 m	MPC · JPL
744281	2009 HD_{21}	—	March 24, 2009	Mount Lemmon	Mount Lemmon Survey	T_{j} (2.88) · APO +1km · PHA	800 m	MPC · JPL
744282	2009 HN_{21}	—	March 19, 2009	Catalina	CSS	H	520 m	MPC · JPL
744283	2009 HN_{22}	—	April 17, 2009	Kitt Peak	Spacewatch	H	400 m	MPC · JPL
744284	2009 HS_{22}	—	March 28, 2009	Mount Lemmon	Mount Lemmon Survey	HNS	930 m	MPC · JPL
744285	2009 HL_{30}	—	July 21, 2006	Mount Lemmon	Mount Lemmon Survey	NYS	600 m	MPC · JPL
744286	2009 HW_{30}	—	April 19, 2009	Kitt Peak	Spacewatch	THM	2.1 km	MPC · JPL
744287	2009 HY_{35}	—	February 13, 2009	Mount Lemmon	Mount Lemmon Survey	BAR	1.2 km	MPC · JPL
744288	2009 HX_{37}	—	April 1, 2009	Kitt Peak	Spacewatch	HNS	1.0 km	MPC · JPL
744289	2009 HP_{43}	—	April 20, 2009	Kitt Peak	Spacewatch	·	870 m	MPC · JPL
744290	2009 HH_{47}	—	April 19, 2009	Kitt Peak	Spacewatch	·	1.4 km	MPC · JPL
744291	2009 HT_{49}	—	April 21, 2009	Kitt Peak	Spacewatch	·	2.9 km	MPC · JPL
744292	2009 HX_{54}	—	April 20, 2009	Kitt Peak	Spacewatch	·	1.3 km	MPC · JPL
744293	2009 HH_{57}	—	April 21, 2009	Mount Lemmon	Mount Lemmon Survey	PHO	640 m	MPC · JPL
744294	2009 HF_{66}	—	April 23, 2009	Kitt Peak	Spacewatch	·	660 m	MPC · JPL
744295	2009 HW_{80}	—	April 29, 2009	Mount Lemmon	Mount Lemmon Survey	MAR	790 m	MPC · JPL
744296	2009 HC_{86}	—	March 18, 2009	Kitt Peak	Spacewatch	·	2.1 km	MPC · JPL
744297	2009 HW_{86}	—	April 30, 2009	Mount Lemmon	Mount Lemmon Survey	·	1.4 km	MPC · JPL
744298	2009 HN_{88}	—	April 29, 2009	Kitt Peak	Spacewatch	·	1.1 km	MPC · JPL
744299	2009 HF_{89}	—	April 24, 2009	Cerro Burek	I. de la Cueva	·	1.7 km	MPC · JPL
744300	2009 HU_{105}	—	April 29, 2009	Kitt Peak	Spacewatch	·	1.3 km	MPC · JPL

== 744301–744400 ==
back to top

Designation			Discovery			Properties		Ref
Permanent	Provisional	Named after	Date	Site	Discoverer(s)	Category	Diam.	Ref
744301	2009 HM_{111}	—	September 11, 2010	Kitt Peak	Spacewatch	·	620 m	MPC · JPL
744302	2009 HO_{111}	—	April 18, 2009	Mount Lemmon	Mount Lemmon Survey	·	680 m	MPC · JPL
744303	2009 HQ_{111}	—	April 23, 2009	Mount Lemmon	Mount Lemmon Survey	·	670 m	MPC · JPL
744304	2009 HR_{111}	—	September 5, 2010	Mount Lemmon	Mount Lemmon Survey	·	730 m	MPC · JPL
744305	2009 HT_{111}	—	November 3, 2010	Mount Lemmon	Mount Lemmon Survey	·	1.1 km	MPC · JPL
744306	2009 HY_{112}	—	March 19, 2013	Haleakala	Pan-STARRS 1	RAF	720 m	MPC · JPL
744307	2009 HW_{113}	—	October 12, 2010	Mount Lemmon	Mount Lemmon Survey	·	620 m	MPC · JPL
744308	2009 HC_{114}	—	September 9, 2015	Haleakala	Pan-STARRS 1	(18466)	1.6 km	MPC · JPL
744309	2009 HO_{114}	—	March 28, 2015	Haleakala	Pan-STARRS 1	·	2.5 km	MPC · JPL
744310	2009 HG_{115}	—	January 17, 2013	Mount Lemmon	Mount Lemmon Survey	·	1.3 km	MPC · JPL
744311	2009 HO_{116}	—	September 24, 2017	Mount Lemmon	Mount Lemmon Survey	·	2.4 km	MPC · JPL
744312	2009 HY_{116}	—	October 27, 2011	Mount Lemmon	Mount Lemmon Survey	·	2.0 km	MPC · JPL
744313	2009 HP_{117}	—	September 26, 2011	Haleakala	Pan-STARRS 1	·	2.5 km	MPC · JPL
744314	2009 HU_{117}	—	April 20, 2009	Kitt Peak	Spacewatch	·	1.6 km	MPC · JPL
744315	2009 HJ_{119}	—	November 15, 2011	Mount Lemmon	Mount Lemmon Survey	·	1.3 km	MPC · JPL
744316	2009 HO_{121}	—	April 21, 2009	Mount Lemmon	Mount Lemmon Survey	DOR	1.9 km	MPC · JPL
744317	2009 HN_{124}	—	April 19, 2009	Mount Lemmon	Mount Lemmon Survey	·	580 m	MPC · JPL
744318	2009 HX_{124}	—	April 21, 2009	Mount Lemmon	Mount Lemmon Survey	·	570 m	MPC · JPL
744319	2009 JK_{3}	—	April 18, 2009	Kitt Peak	Spacewatch	·	1.7 km	MPC · JPL
744320	2009 JD_{10}	—	March 24, 2009	Mount Lemmon	Mount Lemmon Survey	·	3.3 km	MPC · JPL
744321	2009 JG_{11}	—	June 18, 2005	Mount Lemmon	Mount Lemmon Survey	·	1.4 km	MPC · JPL
744322	2009 JU_{13}	—	May 1, 2009	Cerro Burek	I. de la Cueva	·	1.1 km	MPC · JPL
744323	2009 JN_{15}	—	May 3, 2009	Mount Lemmon	Mount Lemmon Survey	L5	6.9 km	MPC · JPL
744324	2009 JL_{18}	—	August 29, 2006	Kitt Peak	Spacewatch	·	510 m	MPC · JPL
744325	2009 JS_{19}	—	May 3, 2009	Kitt Peak	Spacewatch	·	560 m	MPC · JPL
744326	2009 JR_{20}	—	May 15, 2009	Mount Lemmon	Mount Lemmon Survey	·	2.0 km	MPC · JPL
744327	2009 JT_{21}	—	March 4, 2016	Haleakala	Pan-STARRS 1	·	530 m	MPC · JPL
744328	2009 JL_{22}	—	May 4, 2009	Mount Lemmon	Mount Lemmon Survey	·	1.0 km	MPC · JPL
744329	2009 JB_{23}	—	May 1, 2009	Mount Lemmon	Mount Lemmon Survey	·	1.6 km	MPC · JPL
744330	2009 KV_{3}	—	April 19, 2009	Catalina	CSS	H	420 m	MPC · JPL
744331	2009 KB_{9}	—	April 19, 2009	Kitt Peak	Spacewatch	·	2.4 km	MPC · JPL
744332	2009 KZ_{11}	—	April 30, 2009	Kitt Peak	Spacewatch	·	1.6 km	MPC · JPL
744333	2009 KY_{15}	—	May 1, 2009	Kitt Peak	Spacewatch	·	1.2 km	MPC · JPL
744334	2009 KP_{16}	—	June 30, 2005	Palomar	NEAT	·	1.9 km	MPC · JPL
744335	2009 KJ_{18}	—	May 27, 2009	Mount Lemmon	Mount Lemmon Survey	HNS	1.1 km	MPC · JPL
744336	2009 KY_{22}	—	May 26, 2009	Kitt Peak	Spacewatch	EUP	4.3 km	MPC · JPL
744337	2009 KS_{37}	—	July 8, 2005	Kitt Peak	Spacewatch	ADE	1.3 km	MPC · JPL
744338	2009 KZ_{38}	—	May 16, 2009	Mount Lemmon	Mount Lemmon Survey	PHO	800 m	MPC · JPL
744339	2009 KE_{39}	—	May 30, 2009	Mount Lemmon	Mount Lemmon Survey	NYS	880 m	MPC · JPL
744340	2009 KF_{39}	—	May 28, 2009	Mount Lemmon	Mount Lemmon Survey	NYS	880 m	MPC · JPL
744341	2009 KO_{39}	—	October 26, 2013	Mount Lemmon	Mount Lemmon Survey	·	590 m	MPC · JPL
744342	2009 KQ_{40}	—	May 30, 2016	Haleakala	Pan-STARRS 1	·	600 m	MPC · JPL
744343	2009 KC_{41}	—	August 15, 2014	Haleakala	Pan-STARRS 1	·	1.2 km	MPC · JPL
744344	2009 KN_{41}	—	May 30, 2009	Mount Lemmon	Mount Lemmon Survey	·	620 m	MPC · JPL
744345	2009 KT_{41}	—	March 5, 2013	Haleakala	Pan-STARRS 1	MRX	810 m	MPC · JPL
744346	2009 KX_{42}	—	May 27, 2009	Mount Lemmon	Mount Lemmon Survey	NYS	770 m	MPC · JPL
744347	2009 KF_{43}	—	May 16, 2009	Mount Lemmon	Mount Lemmon Survey	JUN	870 m	MPC · JPL
744348	2009 KJ_{43}	—	May 16, 2009	Mount Lemmon	Mount Lemmon Survey	L5	6.8 km	MPC · JPL
744349	2009 KR_{43}	—	May 25, 2009	Kitt Peak	Spacewatch	L5	5.9 km	MPC · JPL
744350	2009 LF_{1}	—	May 16, 2009	Kitt Peak	Spacewatch	·	690 m	MPC · JPL
744351	2009 LU_{1}	—	June 12, 2009	Kitt Peak	Spacewatch	·	580 m	MPC · JPL
744352	2009 LE_{5}	—	August 28, 2006	Sacramento Peak	SDSS Collaboration	MAR	1.1 km	MPC · JPL
744353	2009 LP_{7}	—	July 24, 2015	Haleakala	Pan-STARRS 1	BRA	1.3 km	MPC · JPL
744354	2009 LS_{7}	—	March 13, 2013	Kitt Peak	Spacewatch	·	1.4 km	MPC · JPL
744355	2009 LY_{7}	—	April 17, 2013	Haleakala	Pan-STARRS 1	MAR	760 m	MPC · JPL
744356	2009 MP_{2}	—	June 17, 2009	Kitt Peak	Spacewatch	·	1.6 km	MPC · JPL
744357	2009 MR_{3}	—	May 15, 2009	Catalina	CSS	·	1.1 km	MPC · JPL
744358	2009 MN_{11}	—	January 2, 2012	Kitt Peak	Spacewatch	·	1.9 km	MPC · JPL
744359	2009 MR_{11}	—	December 8, 2015	Haleakala	Pan-STARRS 1	·	2.2 km	MPC · JPL
744360	2009 MV_{11}	—	November 2, 2011	Mount Lemmon	Mount Lemmon Survey	·	2.3 km	MPC · JPL
744361	2009 NP_{2}	—	July 12, 2009	Kitt Peak	Spacewatch	·	1.0 km	MPC · JPL
744362	2009 OA_{7}	—	July 14, 2009	Kitt Peak	Spacewatch	·	1.0 km	MPC · JPL
744363	2009 OJ_{9}	—	November 20, 1998	Piszkéstető	K. Sárneczky, L. Kiss	LIX	3.5 km	MPC · JPL
744364	2009 OT_{16}	—	July 28, 2009	Kitt Peak	Spacewatch	·	1.9 km	MPC · JPL
744365	2009 OV_{17}	—	July 28, 2009	Kitt Peak	Spacewatch	·	610 m	MPC · JPL
744366	2009 OC_{19}	—	February 13, 2008	Kitt Peak	Spacewatch	V	530 m	MPC · JPL
744367	2009 OU_{21}	—	July 31, 2009	Bergisch Gladbach	W. Bickel	JUN	840 m	MPC · JPL
744368	2009 OK_{25}	—	August 27, 2009	La Sagra	OAM	·	880 m	MPC · JPL
744369	2009 OT_{26}	—	May 23, 2012	Mount Lemmon	Mount Lemmon Survey	·	560 m	MPC · JPL
744370	2009 OX_{26}	—	July 27, 2009	Kitt Peak	Spacewatch	·	590 m	MPC · JPL
744371	2009 OM_{27}	—	July 30, 2009	Bergisch Gladbach	W. Bickel	EUN	1.2 km	MPC · JPL
744372	2009 OG_{28}	—	July 27, 2009	Kitt Peak	Spacewatch	NYS	800 m	MPC · JPL
744373	2009 OH_{28}	—	July 28, 2009	Catalina	CSS	PHO	730 m	MPC · JPL
744374	2009 OO_{28}	—	July 24, 2009	Siding Spring	SSS	ERI	1.3 km	MPC · JPL
744375	2009 PG_{9}	—	August 15, 2009	Kitt Peak	Spacewatch	·	580 m	MPC · JPL
744376	2009 PX_{9}	—	August 16, 2009	Catalina	CSS	·	1.1 km	MPC · JPL
744377	2009 PB_{11}	—	June 24, 2009	Mount Lemmon	Mount Lemmon Survey	·	1.1 km	MPC · JPL
744378	2009 PN_{12}	—	August 15, 2009	Kitt Peak	Spacewatch	PHO	780 m	MPC · JPL
744379	2009 PS_{19}	—	August 18, 2009	La Sagra	OAM	·	1 km	MPC · JPL
744380	2009 PE_{22}	—	January 12, 2016	Haleakala	Pan-STARRS 1	·	1.3 km	MPC · JPL
744381	2009 PM_{23}	—	August 15, 2009	Kitt Peak	Spacewatch	NYS	1.1 km	MPC · JPL
744382	2009 QB_{1}	—	July 14, 2009	Kitt Peak	Spacewatch	·	570 m	MPC · JPL
744383	2009 QO_{1}	—	August 16, 2009	La Sagra	OAM	·	650 m	MPC · JPL
744384	2009 QS_{6}	—	January 5, 2000	Kitt Peak	Spacewatch	TIR	2.5 km	MPC · JPL
744385	2009 QZ_{9}	—	August 19, 2009	Wildberg	R. Apitzsch	NYS	890 m	MPC · JPL
744386	2009 QT_{12}	—	August 16, 2009	Kitt Peak	Spacewatch	·	820 m	MPC · JPL
744387	2009 QU_{15}	—	August 16, 2009	Kitt Peak	Spacewatch	·	960 m	MPC · JPL
744388	2009 QQ_{17}	—	August 17, 2009	Kitt Peak	Spacewatch	·	560 m	MPC · JPL
744389	2009 QU_{21}	—	August 20, 2009	La Sagra	OAM	MAS	710 m	MPC · JPL
744390	2009 QQ_{22}	—	August 15, 2009	Kitt Peak	Spacewatch	T_{j} (2.91)	2.4 km	MPC · JPL
744391	2009 QP_{24}	—	August 16, 2009	Catalina	CSS	·	1.1 km	MPC · JPL
744392	2009 QT_{25}	—	December 27, 2006	Mount Lemmon	Mount Lemmon Survey	·	810 m	MPC · JPL
744393	2009 QL_{29}	—	August 22, 2009	Bergisch Gladbach	W. Bickel	ADE	1.6 km	MPC · JPL
744394	2009 QV_{29}	—	August 21, 2009	Sandlot	G. Hug	MAS	630 m	MPC · JPL
744395	2009 QZ_{31}	—	August 20, 2009	Sierra Stars	R. Matson	NYS	770 m	MPC · JPL
744396	2009 QN_{34}	—	August 27, 2009	La Sagra	OAM	·	760 m	MPC · JPL
744397	2009 QV_{41}	—	August 19, 2009	La Sagra	OAM	·	2.5 km	MPC · JPL
744398	2009 QE_{42}	—	October 31, 2002	Kitt Peak	Spacewatch	·	890 m	MPC · JPL
744399	2009 QA_{43}	—	August 26, 2009	La Sagra	OAM	·	3.2 km	MPC · JPL
744400	2009 QT_{44}	—	August 27, 2009	Kitt Peak	Spacewatch	·	2.3 km	MPC · JPL

== 744401–744500 ==
back to top

Designation			Discovery			Properties		Ref
Permanent	Provisional	Named after	Date	Site	Discoverer(s)	Category	Diam.	Ref
744401	2009 QD_{45}	—	August 18, 2009	Kitt Peak	Spacewatch	·	1.6 km	MPC · JPL
744402	2009 QM_{46}	—	August 18, 2009	Kitt Peak	Spacewatch	EUN	1.1 km	MPC · JPL
744403	2009 QG_{50}	—	March 28, 2008	Mount Lemmon	Mount Lemmon Survey	·	740 m	MPC · JPL
744404	2009 QH_{54}	—	August 20, 2009	Kitt Peak	Spacewatch	·	2.3 km	MPC · JPL
744405	2009 QA_{55}	—	August 17, 2009	Kitt Peak	Spacewatch	·	1.1 km	MPC · JPL
744406	2009 QC_{55}	—	August 18, 2009	Kitt Peak	Spacewatch	V	530 m	MPC · JPL
744407	2009 QD_{56}	—	August 27, 2009	Kitt Peak	Spacewatch	·	970 m	MPC · JPL
744408	2009 QU_{56}	—	August 16, 2009	Kitt Peak	Spacewatch	3:2	4.3 km	MPC · JPL
744409	2009 QY_{59}	—	August 17, 2009	La Sagra	OAM	EUN	1.1 km	MPC · JPL
744410	2009 QF_{61}	—	August 16, 2009	Kitt Peak	Spacewatch	·	2.1 km	MPC · JPL
744411	2009 QY_{63}	—	August 17, 2009	Catalina	CSS	·	1.0 km	MPC · JPL
744412	2009 QO_{66}	—	August 27, 2009	Kitt Peak	Spacewatch	MAS	530 m	MPC · JPL
744413	2009 QB_{67}	—	August 28, 2009	Kitt Peak	Spacewatch	·	1.1 km	MPC · JPL
744414	2009 QG_{67}	—	August 27, 2009	Kitt Peak	Spacewatch	BAP	760 m	MPC · JPL
744415	2009 QH_{67}	—	January 26, 2006	Mount Lemmon	Mount Lemmon Survey	·	2.4 km	MPC · JPL
744416	2009 QN_{67}	—	August 16, 2009	Kitt Peak	Spacewatch	·	840 m	MPC · JPL
744417	2009 QO_{67}	—	August 18, 2009	Kitt Peak	Spacewatch	·	1.0 km	MPC · JPL
744418	2009 QQ_{67}	—	November 1, 2013	Haleakala	Pan-STARRS 1	MAS	670 m	MPC · JPL
744419	2009 QG_{68}	—	August 29, 2009	Catalina	CSS	·	1.9 km	MPC · JPL
744420	2009 QP_{68}	—	August 18, 2009	Kitt Peak	Spacewatch	·	890 m	MPC · JPL
744421	2009 QX_{68}	—	August 16, 2009	La Sagra	OAM	NYS	890 m	MPC · JPL
744422	2009 QJ_{69}	—	October 3, 2014	Mount Lemmon	Mount Lemmon Survey	·	1.7 km	MPC · JPL
744423	2009 QL_{71}	—	August 18, 2009	Kitt Peak	Spacewatch	·	850 m	MPC · JPL
744424	2009 QV_{73}	—	August 27, 2009	Kitt Peak	Spacewatch	·	840 m	MPC · JPL
744425	2009 QQ_{75}	—	August 28, 2009	Kitt Peak	Spacewatch	V	410 m	MPC · JPL
744426	2009 RK_{2}	—	September 10, 2009	Tenerife	ESA OGS	V	490 m	MPC · JPL
744427	2009 RM_{8}	—	September 12, 2009	Kitt Peak	Spacewatch	·	1.8 km	MPC · JPL
744428	2009 RQ_{8}	—	September 12, 2009	Kitt Peak	Spacewatch	DOR	1.7 km	MPC · JPL
744429	2009 RY_{19}	—	September 14, 2009	Catalina	CSS	·	1.5 km	MPC · JPL
744430	2009 RY_{29}	—	September 14, 2009	Kitt Peak	Spacewatch	·	1.8 km	MPC · JPL
744431	2009 RX_{35}	—	September 14, 2009	Kitt Peak	Spacewatch	·	1.3 km	MPC · JPL
744432	2009 RP_{37}	—	September 15, 2009	Kitt Peak	Spacewatch	PHO	630 m	MPC · JPL
744433	2009 RR_{38}	—	September 15, 2009	Kitt Peak	Spacewatch	·	760 m	MPC · JPL
744434	2009 RJ_{40}	—	September 15, 2009	Kitt Peak	Spacewatch	·	2.7 km	MPC · JPL
744435	2009 RT_{42}	—	September 15, 2009	Kitt Peak	Spacewatch	·	1.5 km	MPC · JPL
744436	2009 RS_{52}	—	September 15, 2009	Kitt Peak	Spacewatch	·	790 m	MPC · JPL
744437	2009 RB_{56}	—	September 15, 2009	Kitt Peak	Spacewatch	·	910 m	MPC · JPL
744438	2009 RA_{58}	—	September 14, 2009	Catalina	CSS	·	1.1 km	MPC · JPL
744439	2009 RM_{62}	—	September 15, 2009	Kitt Peak	Spacewatch	·	800 m	MPC · JPL
744440	2009 RQ_{62}	—	September 15, 2009	Kitt Peak	Spacewatch	·	600 m	MPC · JPL
744441	2009 RT_{62}	—	April 8, 2008	Mount Lemmon	Mount Lemmon Survey	·	780 m	MPC · JPL
744442	2009 RZ_{62}	—	September 12, 2009	Kitt Peak	Spacewatch	L4	6.2 km	MPC · JPL
744443	2009 RW_{64}	—	September 15, 2009	Kitt Peak	Spacewatch	·	790 m	MPC · JPL
744444	2009 RC_{67}	—	November 23, 2006	Mount Lemmon	Mount Lemmon Survey	·	530 m	MPC · JPL
744445	2009 RN_{67}	—	September 15, 2009	Kitt Peak	Spacewatch	·	590 m	MPC · JPL
744446	2009 RO_{70}	—	September 12, 2009	Kitt Peak	Spacewatch	·	1.3 km	MPC · JPL
744447	2009 RR_{71}	—	September 15, 2009	Kitt Peak	Spacewatch	V	440 m	MPC · JPL
744448	2009 RB_{74}	—	September 15, 2009	Kitt Peak	Spacewatch	·	1.1 km	MPC · JPL
744449	2009 RU_{74}	—	September 14, 2009	Socorro	LINEAR	·	1.2 km	MPC · JPL
744450	2009 RH_{76}	—	October 27, 2005	Kitt Peak	Spacewatch	·	1.1 km	MPC · JPL
744451	2009 RD_{77}	—	June 17, 2013	Haleakala	Pan-STARRS 1	·	1.3 km	MPC · JPL
744452	2009 RS_{77}	—	September 15, 2009	Kitt Peak	Spacewatch	V	470 m	MPC · JPL
744453	2009 RW_{79}	—	July 30, 2014	Kitt Peak	Spacewatch	·	2.2 km	MPC · JPL
744454	2009 RX_{80}	—	September 15, 2009	Kitt Peak	Spacewatch	·	950 m	MPC · JPL
744455	2009 RP_{82}	—	September 15, 2009	Kitt Peak	Spacewatch	L4	6.2 km	MPC · JPL
744456	2009 SE_{7}	—	September 16, 2009	Mount Lemmon	Mount Lemmon Survey	·	620 m	MPC · JPL
744457	2009 SQ_{13}	—	August 28, 2009	Kitt Peak	Spacewatch	·	1.7 km	MPC · JPL
744458	2009 SG_{14}	—	August 17, 2009	Kitt Peak	Spacewatch	DOR	1.8 km	MPC · JPL
744459	2009 SK_{17}	—	September 17, 2009	Moletai	K. Černis, Zdanavicius, K.	·	2.2 km	MPC · JPL
744460	2009 SH_{24}	—	September 16, 2009	Kitt Peak	Spacewatch	·	1.6 km	MPC · JPL
744461	2009 SY_{25}	—	September 27, 2005	Kitt Peak	Spacewatch	·	680 m	MPC · JPL
744462	2009 SO_{34}	—	September 16, 2009	Kitt Peak	Spacewatch	EOS	1.3 km	MPC · JPL
744463	2009 SX_{34}	—	September 16, 2009	Kitt Peak	Spacewatch	·	780 m	MPC · JPL
744464	2009 ST_{43}	—	September 16, 2009	Kitt Peak	Spacewatch	·	2.1 km	MPC · JPL
744465	2009 SD_{53}	—	September 17, 2009	Catalina	CSS	·	1.3 km	MPC · JPL
744466	2009 SL_{58}	—	September 17, 2009	Kitt Peak	Spacewatch	·	1.7 km	MPC · JPL
744467	2009 SQ_{58}	—	September 17, 2009	Kitt Peak	Spacewatch	·	750 m	MPC · JPL
744468	2009 SN_{59}	—	September 17, 2009	Kitt Peak	Spacewatch	·	1.3 km	MPC · JPL
744469	2009 SH_{66}	—	September 17, 2009	Kitt Peak	Spacewatch	NYS	830 m	MPC · JPL
744470	2009 SB_{68}	—	September 17, 2009	Kitt Peak	Spacewatch	·	1.3 km	MPC · JPL
744471	2009 SF_{68}	—	September 17, 2009	Kitt Peak	Spacewatch	·	2.4 km	MPC · JPL
744472	2009 SG_{73}	—	September 17, 2009	Mount Lemmon	Mount Lemmon Survey	·	1.5 km	MPC · JPL
744473	2009 SK_{77}	—	September 17, 2009	Kitt Peak	Spacewatch	·	1.7 km	MPC · JPL
744474	2009 SV_{77}	—	September 17, 2009	Moletai	K. Černis, Zdanavicius, K.	·	1.9 km	MPC · JPL
744475	2009 SJ_{82}	—	September 18, 2009	Mount Lemmon	Mount Lemmon Survey	·	540 m	MPC · JPL
744476	2009 SS_{83}	—	August 27, 2009	Kitt Peak	Spacewatch	KOR	1.2 km	MPC · JPL
744477	2009 SU_{84}	—	August 29, 2009	Kitt Peak	Spacewatch	MAS	600 m	MPC · JPL
744478	2009 SW_{87}	—	September 18, 2009	Kitt Peak	Spacewatch	MAS	570 m	MPC · JPL
744479	2009 SP_{88}	—	August 28, 2009	Kitt Peak	Spacewatch	MAS	550 m	MPC · JPL
744480	2009 SE_{89}	—	September 18, 2009	Mount Lemmon	Mount Lemmon Survey	V	530 m	MPC · JPL
744481	2009 SM_{89}	—	September 18, 2009	Mount Lemmon	Mount Lemmon Survey	·	590 m	MPC · JPL
744482	2009 SN_{90}	—	September 16, 2009	Kitt Peak	Spacewatch	·	760 m	MPC · JPL
744483	2009 SG_{93}	—	September 19, 2009	Mount Lemmon	Mount Lemmon Survey	·	740 m	MPC · JPL
744484	2009 SZ_{94}	—	September 19, 2009	Mount Lemmon	Mount Lemmon Survey	MAS	620 m	MPC · JPL
744485	2009 SL_{95}	—	September 19, 2009	Mount Lemmon	Mount Lemmon Survey	AGN	1.1 km	MPC · JPL
744486	2009 SL_{97}	—	September 20, 2009	Mount Lemmon	Mount Lemmon Survey	·	820 m	MPC · JPL
744487	2009 SB_{98}	—	September 20, 2009	Kitt Peak	Spacewatch	·	2.2 km	MPC · JPL
744488	2009 SV_{105}	—	September 16, 2009	Mount Lemmon	Mount Lemmon Survey	·	1.0 km	MPC · JPL
744489	2009 SR_{108}	—	August 16, 2009	Catalina	CSS	V	530 m	MPC · JPL
744490	2009 SE_{112}	—	September 18, 2009	Kitt Peak	Spacewatch	·	1.9 km	MPC · JPL
744491	2009 SE_{128}	—	September 18, 2009	Kitt Peak	Spacewatch	·	1.6 km	MPC · JPL
744492	2009 SM_{128}	—	September 18, 2009	Kitt Peak	Spacewatch	·	2.6 km	MPC · JPL
744493	2009 SU_{129}	—	September 18, 2009	Kitt Peak	Spacewatch	·	2.3 km	MPC · JPL
744494	2009 SM_{130}	—	September 18, 2009	Kitt Peak	Spacewatch	MAS	620 m	MPC · JPL
744495	2009 SK_{131}	—	September 18, 2009	Kitt Peak	Spacewatch	MAS	600 m	MPC · JPL
744496	2009 ST_{132}	—	September 18, 2009	Kitt Peak	Spacewatch	·	1.4 km	MPC · JPL
744497	2009 ST_{135}	—	September 18, 2009	Kitt Peak	Spacewatch	·	890 m	MPC · JPL
744498	2009 SR_{140}	—	September 19, 2009	Kitt Peak	Spacewatch	·	1.6 km	MPC · JPL
744499	2009 SH_{151}	—	September 20, 2009	Kitt Peak	Spacewatch	NYS	850 m	MPC · JPL
744500	2009 SR_{151}	—	September 20, 2009	Kitt Peak	Spacewatch	MIS	1.7 km	MPC · JPL

== 744501–744600 ==
back to top

Designation			Discovery			Properties		Ref
Permanent	Provisional	Named after	Date	Site	Discoverer(s)	Category	Diam.	Ref
744501	2009 SZ_{157}	—	September 20, 2009	Mount Lemmon	Mount Lemmon Survey	·	1.7 km	MPC · JPL
744502	2009 SL_{159}	—	September 20, 2009	Kitt Peak	Spacewatch	·	2.7 km	MPC · JPL
744503	2009 SS_{163}	—	September 21, 2009	Kitt Peak	Spacewatch	·	560 m	MPC · JPL
744504	2009 SV_{168}	—	September 22, 2009	Bergisch Gladbach	W. Bickel	H	430 m	MPC · JPL
744505	2009 SO_{180}	—	July 31, 2009	Catalina	CSS	·	1.8 km	MPC · JPL
744506	2009 SD_{186}	—	September 21, 2009	Kitt Peak	Spacewatch	·	1.6 km	MPC · JPL
744507	2009 SS_{187}	—	September 21, 2009	Kitt Peak	Spacewatch	NYS	760 m	MPC · JPL
744508	2009 SY_{187}	—	September 21, 2009	Kitt Peak	Spacewatch	·	850 m	MPC · JPL
744509	2009 SG_{197}	—	September 18, 2009	Kitt Peak	Spacewatch	·	1.7 km	MPC · JPL
744510	2009 SY_{205}	—	September 22, 2009	Kitt Peak	Spacewatch	·	800 m	MPC · JPL
744511	2009 SO_{206}	—	January 28, 2007	Mount Lemmon	Mount Lemmon Survey	·	900 m	MPC · JPL
744512	2009 SQ_{212}	—	September 15, 2009	Kitt Peak	Spacewatch	·	890 m	MPC · JPL
744513	2009 SY_{216}	—	September 1, 2009	Zelenchukskaya	T. V. Krjačko, B. Satovski	·	860 m	MPC · JPL
744514	2009 SV_{218}	—	September 24, 2009	Mount Lemmon	Mount Lemmon Survey	·	1.2 km	MPC · JPL
744515	2009 SL_{221}	—	November 3, 2004	Kitt Peak	Spacewatch	·	2.0 km	MPC · JPL
744516	2009 SJ_{222}	—	August 17, 2009	Kitt Peak	Spacewatch	·	1.6 km	MPC · JPL
744517	2009 SS_{222}	—	August 29, 2009	Kitt Peak	Spacewatch	·	900 m	MPC · JPL
744518	2009 SH_{228}	—	September 26, 2009	Mount Lemmon	Mount Lemmon Survey	·	610 m	MPC · JPL
744519	2009 ST_{230}	—	January 28, 2007	Mount Lemmon	Mount Lemmon Survey	·	980 m	MPC · JPL
744520	2009 SG_{231}	—	September 19, 2009	Kitt Peak	Spacewatch	NYS	860 m	MPC · JPL
744521	2009 ST_{231}	—	September 19, 2009	Kitt Peak	Spacewatch	·	870 m	MPC · JPL
744522	2009 SG_{232}	—	August 29, 2009	Kitt Peak	Spacewatch	·	1.8 km	MPC · JPL
744523	2009 SG_{239}	—	August 15, 2009	Kitt Peak	Spacewatch	PHO	840 m	MPC · JPL
744524	2009 SM_{244}	—	September 17, 2009	Kitt Peak	Spacewatch	·	2.7 km	MPC · JPL
744525	2009 SE_{245}	—	September 21, 2009	Kitt Peak	Spacewatch	NYS	860 m	MPC · JPL
744526	2009 SW_{250}	—	September 20, 2009	Kitt Peak	Spacewatch	L4	6.8 km	MPC · JPL
744527	2009 SF_{258}	—	September 21, 2009	Mount Lemmon	Mount Lemmon Survey	·	800 m	MPC · JPL
744528	2009 ST_{258}	—	September 21, 2009	Kitt Peak	Spacewatch	·	1.7 km	MPC · JPL
744529	2009 SN_{260}	—	August 18, 2009	Kitt Peak	Spacewatch	·	1.5 km	MPC · JPL
744530	2009 ST_{263}	—	September 23, 2009	Mount Lemmon	Mount Lemmon Survey	·	790 m	MPC · JPL
744531	2009 SR_{267}	—	September 23, 2009	Mount Lemmon	Mount Lemmon Survey	·	1.3 km	MPC · JPL
744532	2009 SV_{268}	—	September 24, 2009	Kitt Peak	Spacewatch	NYS	890 m	MPC · JPL
744533	2009 SM_{270}	—	September 24, 2009	Mount Lemmon	Mount Lemmon Survey	·	1.0 km	MPC · JPL
744534	2009 ST_{279}	—	September 17, 2009	Kitt Peak	Spacewatch	·	520 m	MPC · JPL
744535	2009 SN_{283}	—	September 17, 2009	Kitt Peak	Spacewatch	·	1.1 km	MPC · JPL
744536	2009 SD_{284}	—	September 17, 2009	Kitt Peak	Spacewatch	·	990 m	MPC · JPL
744537	2009 ST_{287}	—	September 18, 2009	Kitt Peak	Spacewatch	HYG	2.1 km	MPC · JPL
744538	2009 SL_{289}	—	September 25, 2009	Kitt Peak	Spacewatch	·	1.7 km	MPC · JPL
744539	2009 SW_{294}	—	September 17, 2009	Mount Lemmon	Mount Lemmon Survey	·	1.9 km	MPC · JPL
744540	2009 SB_{295}	—	September 19, 2009	Kitt Peak	Spacewatch	NYS	910 m	MPC · JPL
744541	2009 SG_{295}	—	September 27, 2009	Mount Lemmon	Mount Lemmon Survey	·	1.5 km	MPC · JPL
744542	2009 SQ_{300}	—	August 17, 2009	Kitt Peak	Spacewatch	·	610 m	MPC · JPL
744543	2009 SH_{303}	—	August 16, 2009	Kitt Peak	Spacewatch	·	2.0 km	MPC · JPL
744544	2009 SJ_{305}	—	September 17, 2009	Kitt Peak	Spacewatch	·	1.4 km	MPC · JPL
744545	2009 SC_{306}	—	March 8, 2008	Kitt Peak	Spacewatch	·	1.3 km	MPC · JPL
744546	2009 SS_{307}	—	September 17, 2009	Kitt Peak	Spacewatch	·	1.9 km	MPC · JPL
744547	2009 SS_{317}	—	September 19, 2009	Kitt Peak	Spacewatch	NYS	900 m	MPC · JPL
744548	2009 SW_{318}	—	August 29, 2009	Kitt Peak	Spacewatch	EOS	1.4 km	MPC · JPL
744549	2009 SB_{323}	—	September 22, 2009	Bergisch Gladbach	W. Bickel	·	1.5 km	MPC · JPL
744550	2009 SA_{327}	—	September 20, 2009	Catalina	CSS	·	1.4 km	MPC · JPL
744551	2009 ST_{331}	—	August 16, 2009	Kitt Peak	Spacewatch	·	640 m	MPC · JPL
744552	2009 SU_{332}	—	August 18, 2009	Catalina	CSS	THB	2.8 km	MPC · JPL
744553	2009 SB_{344}	—	March 15, 2007	Mount Lemmon	Mount Lemmon Survey	·	2.5 km	MPC · JPL
744554	2009 SQ_{344}	—	September 18, 2009	Kitt Peak	Spacewatch	·	1.3 km	MPC · JPL
744555	2009 SD_{350}	—	September 21, 2009	Mount Lemmon	Mount Lemmon Survey	L4	7.4 km	MPC · JPL
744556	2009 SK_{351}	—	September 16, 2009	Kitt Peak	Spacewatch	·	2.1 km	MPC · JPL
744557	2009 ST_{351}	—	September 29, 2009	Mount Lemmon	Mount Lemmon Survey	·	740 m	MPC · JPL
744558	2009 SG_{355}	—	September 22, 2009	Mount Lemmon	Mount Lemmon Survey	L4 · (8060)	5.8 km	MPC · JPL
744559	2009 SX_{356}	—	September 18, 2009	Kitt Peak	Spacewatch	KOR	1.3 km	MPC · JPL
744560	2009 SV_{360}	—	September 19, 2009	Mount Lemmon	Mount Lemmon Survey	EOS	1.6 km	MPC · JPL
744561	2009 SO_{362}	—	September 29, 2009	Mount Lemmon	Mount Lemmon Survey	·	1.4 km	MPC · JPL
744562	2009 SS_{366}	—	October 2, 2009	Mount Lemmon	Mount Lemmon Survey	·	1.5 km	MPC · JPL
744563	2009 SD_{371}	—	September 28, 2009	Mount Lemmon	Mount Lemmon Survey	·	980 m	MPC · JPL
744564	2009 SV_{372}	—	September 25, 2009	Mount Lemmon	Mount Lemmon Survey	·	1.2 km	MPC · JPL
744565	2009 SV_{373}	—	October 5, 2013	Haleakala	Pan-STARRS 1	·	1.1 km	MPC · JPL
744566	2009 SX_{373}	—	September 24, 2009	Mount Lemmon	Mount Lemmon Survey	MAS	660 m	MPC · JPL
744567	2009 SZ_{373}	—	September 21, 2009	Mount Lemmon	Mount Lemmon Survey	·	580 m	MPC · JPL
744568	2009 SB_{374}	—	March 2, 2011	Kitt Peak	Spacewatch	·	940 m	MPC · JPL
744569	2009 SG_{374}	—	December 14, 2006	Kitt Peak	Spacewatch	·	850 m	MPC · JPL
744570	2009 SJ_{374}	—	December 11, 2013	Haleakala	Pan-STARRS 1	·	610 m	MPC · JPL
744571	2009 SF_{375}	—	September 20, 2009	Kitt Peak	Spacewatch	·	590 m	MPC · JPL
744572	2009 SA_{376}	—	August 29, 2009	Kitt Peak	Spacewatch	·	1.5 km	MPC · JPL
744573	2009 SK_{376}	—	September 9, 2015	Haleakala	Pan-STARRS 1	·	2.3 km	MPC · JPL
744574	2009 SZ_{376}	—	September 21, 2009	Mount Lemmon	Mount Lemmon Survey	MAS	510 m	MPC · JPL
744575	2009 SA_{377}	—	November 27, 2013	Haleakala	Pan-STARRS 1	V	480 m	MPC · JPL
744576	2009 SM_{377}	—	December 25, 2013	Mount Lemmon	Mount Lemmon Survey	·	640 m	MPC · JPL
744577	2009 SN_{377}	—	March 6, 2011	Mount Lemmon	Mount Lemmon Survey	MAS	550 m	MPC · JPL
744578	2009 SD_{378}	—	September 14, 2013	Mount Lemmon	Mount Lemmon Survey	MAS	530 m	MPC · JPL
744579	2009 SN_{378}	—	September 18, 2009	Kitt Peak	Spacewatch	EOS	1.6 km	MPC · JPL
744580	2009 ST_{378}	—	March 6, 2011	Mount Lemmon	Mount Lemmon Survey	·	660 m	MPC · JPL
744581	2009 SM_{379}	—	September 19, 2009	Kitt Peak	Spacewatch	·	1.9 km	MPC · JPL
744582	2009 SP_{380}	—	April 5, 2014	Haleakala	Pan-STARRS 1	H	420 m	MPC · JPL
744583	2009 SN_{382}	—	August 20, 2009	Kitt Peak	Spacewatch	·	1.6 km	MPC · JPL
744584	2009 SP_{382}	—	September 17, 2009	Kitt Peak	Spacewatch	KOR	1.2 km	MPC · JPL
744585	2009 SF_{383}	—	September 28, 2009	Kitt Peak	Spacewatch	·	1.6 km	MPC · JPL
744586	2009 SP_{383}	—	September 25, 2009	Kitt Peak	Spacewatch	·	1.7 km	MPC · JPL
744587	2009 SE_{384}	—	March 15, 2012	Mount Lemmon	Mount Lemmon Survey	·	1.6 km	MPC · JPL
744588	2009 SJ_{384}	—	November 10, 2013	Mount Lemmon	Mount Lemmon Survey	·	670 m	MPC · JPL
744589	2009 SA_{385}	—	September 27, 2009	Kitt Peak	Spacewatch	·	810 m	MPC · JPL
744590	2009 SU_{385}	—	September 21, 2009	Mount Lemmon	Mount Lemmon Survey	·	2.0 km	MPC · JPL
744591	2009 SB_{386}	—	August 31, 2014	Kitt Peak	Spacewatch	·	2.0 km	MPC · JPL
744592	2009 SD_{386}	—	September 19, 2009	Kitt Peak	Spacewatch	·	1.5 km	MPC · JPL
744593	2009 SN_{386}	—	July 17, 2013	Siding Spring	SSS	·	1.9 km	MPC · JPL
744594	2009 SO_{389}	—	September 16, 2009	Kitt Peak	Spacewatch	·	1 km	MPC · JPL
744595	2009 SQ_{392}	—	September 25, 2009	Mount Lemmon	Mount Lemmon Survey	·	900 m	MPC · JPL
744596	2009 SX_{392}	—	August 22, 2014	Haleakala	Pan-STARRS 1	·	1.4 km	MPC · JPL
744597	2009 SB_{396}	—	September 22, 2009	Kitt Peak	Spacewatch	·	860 m	MPC · JPL
744598	2009 ST_{396}	—	September 29, 2009	Mount Lemmon	Mount Lemmon Survey	·	2.2 km	MPC · JPL
744599	2009 SJ_{401}	—	September 28, 2009	Mount Lemmon	Mount Lemmon Survey	·	870 m	MPC · JPL
744600	2009 ST_{405}	—	September 22, 2009	Kitt Peak	Spacewatch	L4	6.5 km	MPC · JPL

== 744601–744700 ==
back to top

Designation			Discovery			Properties		Ref
Permanent	Provisional	Named after	Date	Site	Discoverer(s)	Category	Diam.	Ref
744601	2009 SS_{407}	—	September 19, 2009	Catalina	CSS	MAS	580 m	MPC · JPL
744602	2009 SX_{415}	—	September 28, 2009	Mount Lemmon	Mount Lemmon Survey	L4	6.3 km	MPC · JPL
744603	2009 SN_{419}	—	September 17, 2009	Kitt Peak	Spacewatch	L4 · ERY	6.4 km	MPC · JPL
744604	2009 SP_{420}	—	September 20, 2009	Kitt Peak	Spacewatch	L4	7.8 km	MPC · JPL
744605	2009 TT_{2}	—	October 8, 2009	La Silla	A. Galád	·	2.2 km	MPC · JPL
744606	2009 TU_{5}	—	August 23, 2003	Palomar	NEAT	·	2.6 km	MPC · JPL
744607	2009 TV_{7}	—	October 14, 2009	Mayhill	Lowe, A.	·	950 m	MPC · JPL
744608	2009 TL_{9}	—	September 17, 2009	Mount Lemmon	Mount Lemmon Survey	·	3.1 km	MPC · JPL
744609	2009 TB_{10}	—	September 17, 2009	Kitt Peak	Spacewatch	THM	1.8 km	MPC · JPL
744610	2009 TZ_{11}	—	October 14, 2009	Bergisch Gladbach	W. Bickel	·	900 m	MPC · JPL
744611	2009 TG_{19}	—	September 14, 2005	Kitt Peak	Spacewatch	NYS	970 m	MPC · JPL
744612	2009 TX_{31}	—	October 15, 2009	La Sagra	OAM	·	730 m	MPC · JPL
744613	2009 TH_{38}	—	September 26, 2009	Catalina	CSS	·	1.0 km	MPC · JPL
744614	2009 TS_{38}	—	October 13, 2009	La Sagra	OAM	·	490 m	MPC · JPL
744615	2009 TJ_{40}	—	October 2, 2009	Mount Lemmon	Mount Lemmon Survey	·	1.8 km	MPC · JPL
744616	2009 TU_{41}	—	October 14, 2009	Catalina	CSS	·	760 m	MPC · JPL
744617	2009 TL_{50}	—	October 14, 2009	La Sagra	OAM	·	1.2 km	MPC · JPL
744618	2009 TF_{51}	—	October 15, 2009	Mount Lemmon	Mount Lemmon Survey	·	960 m	MPC · JPL
744619	2009 TA_{52}	—	September 17, 2014	Haleakala	Pan-STARRS 1	·	1.8 km	MPC · JPL
744620	2009 TG_{52}	—	June 4, 2013	Mount Lemmon	Mount Lemmon Survey	·	1.7 km	MPC · JPL
744621	2009 TX_{57}	—	October 11, 2009	Mount Lemmon	Mount Lemmon Survey	L4	5.9 km	MPC · JPL
744622	2009 UO	—	September 25, 2009	Kitt Peak	Spacewatch	NYS	1.0 km	MPC · JPL
744623	2009 UT	—	October 17, 2009	Catalina	CSS	H	580 m	MPC · JPL
744624	2009 UE_{12}	—	November 20, 2004	Kitt Peak	Spacewatch	·	1.4 km	MPC · JPL
744625	2009 UQ_{13}	—	July 18, 2005	Palomar	NEAT	NYS	860 m	MPC · JPL
744626	2009 UG_{14}	—	October 20, 2009	Bisei	BATTeRS	·	700 m	MPC · JPL
744627	2009 UB_{28}	—	September 18, 2009	Mount Lemmon	Mount Lemmon Survey	·	660 m	MPC · JPL
744628	2009 UQ_{33}	—	October 18, 2009	Mount Lemmon	Mount Lemmon Survey	·	2.1 km	MPC · JPL
744629	2009 UA_{39}	—	October 22, 2009	Mount Lemmon	Mount Lemmon Survey	·	1.4 km	MPC · JPL
744630	2009 UM_{41}	—	September 15, 2009	Kitt Peak	Spacewatch	V	510 m	MPC · JPL
744631	2009 UM_{48}	—	September 23, 2009	Kitt Peak	Spacewatch	·	1.9 km	MPC · JPL
744632	2009 UM_{52}	—	October 22, 2009	Mount Lemmon	Mount Lemmon Survey	·	680 m	MPC · JPL
744633	2009 US_{54}	—	October 23, 2009	Kitt Peak	Spacewatch	·	940 m	MPC · JPL
744634	2009 US_{56}	—	October 23, 2009	Mount Lemmon	Mount Lemmon Survey	·	1.1 km	MPC · JPL
744635	2009 UT_{56}	—	March 5, 2000	Socorro	LINEAR	·	2.1 km	MPC · JPL
744636	2009 UM_{60}	—	October 17, 2009	Mount Lemmon	Mount Lemmon Survey	·	930 m	MPC · JPL
744637	2009 UE_{64}	—	September 29, 2009	Kitt Peak	Spacewatch	·	1.5 km	MPC · JPL
744638	2009 UW_{66}	—	September 17, 2009	Kitt Peak	Spacewatch	·	1.1 km	MPC · JPL
744639	2009 UA_{68}	—	October 17, 2009	Mount Lemmon	Mount Lemmon Survey	NYS	870 m	MPC · JPL
744640	2009 UD_{69}	—	August 29, 2009	Kitt Peak	Spacewatch	·	1.6 km	MPC · JPL
744641	2009 UV_{70}	—	March 11, 2008	Mount Lemmon	Mount Lemmon Survey	·	880 m	MPC · JPL
744642	2009 UZ_{77}	—	September 14, 2009	Kitt Peak	Spacewatch	EOS	1.5 km	MPC · JPL
744643	2009 UA_{80}	—	October 22, 2009	Mount Lemmon	Mount Lemmon Survey	·	800 m	MPC · JPL
744644	2009 UK_{86}	—	September 20, 2009	Mount Lemmon	Mount Lemmon Survey	BRA	1.4 km	MPC · JPL
744645	2009 UZ_{86}	—	March 10, 2007	Mount Lemmon	Mount Lemmon Survey	·	770 m	MPC · JPL
744646	2009 UC_{89}	—	October 24, 2009	Catalina	CSS	·	910 m	MPC · JPL
744647	2009 UA_{119}	—	September 18, 2009	Kitt Peak	Spacewatch	TIR	1.9 km	MPC · JPL
744648	2009 UT_{121}	—	September 19, 2009	Kitt Peak	Spacewatch	L4	5.7 km	MPC · JPL
744649	2009 UO_{123}	—	October 26, 2009	Mount Lemmon	Mount Lemmon Survey	·	900 m	MPC · JPL
744650	2009 UQ_{129}	—	October 14, 2009	Catalina	CSS	(1547)	1.3 km	MPC · JPL
744651	2009 UT_{129}	—	October 14, 2009	Catalina	CSS	·	2.9 km	MPC · JPL
744652	2009 UB_{131}	—	October 16, 2009	La Sagra	OAM	PHO	1.1 km	MPC · JPL
744653	2009 UR_{131}	—	September 27, 2009	Catalina	CSS	·	1.0 km	MPC · JPL
744654	2009 UF_{138}	—	October 27, 2009	Mount Lemmon	Mount Lemmon Survey	·	1.5 km	MPC · JPL
744655	2009 UR_{142}	—	April 1, 2008	Kitt Peak	Spacewatch	·	730 m	MPC · JPL
744656	2009 UQ_{145}	—	October 2, 2009	Mount Lemmon	Mount Lemmon Survey	·	2.9 km	MPC · JPL
744657	2009 UG_{147}	—	October 24, 2009	Kitt Peak	Spacewatch	·	1.4 km	MPC · JPL
744658	2009 UE_{149}	—	October 24, 2009	Kitt Peak	Spacewatch	·	1.5 km	MPC · JPL
744659	2009 UO_{160}	—	October 24, 2009	Kitt Peak	Spacewatch	·	1.5 km	MPC · JPL
744660	2009 UH_{161}	—	July 2, 2005	Kitt Peak	Spacewatch	·	800 m	MPC · JPL
744661	2009 UO_{161}	—	April 1, 2012	Mount Lemmon	Mount Lemmon Survey	·	2.3 km	MPC · JPL
744662	2009 UB_{162}	—	October 27, 2009	Mount Lemmon	Mount Lemmon Survey	·	3.0 km	MPC · JPL
744663	2009 UU_{162}	—	October 24, 2009	Mount Lemmon	Mount Lemmon Survey	·	2.3 km	MPC · JPL
744664	2009 UC_{163}	—	October 26, 2009	Kitt Peak	Spacewatch	·	1.1 km	MPC · JPL
744665	2009 UO_{163}	—	October 18, 2009	Mount Lemmon	Mount Lemmon Survey	·	1.8 km	MPC · JPL
744666	2009 UE_{165}	—	September 19, 2014	Haleakala	Pan-STARRS 1	EOS	1.4 km	MPC · JPL
744667	2009 UL_{166}	—	October 16, 2009	Mount Lemmon	Mount Lemmon Survey	·	1.8 km	MPC · JPL
744668	2009 UP_{167}	—	April 19, 2012	Mount Lemmon	Mount Lemmon Survey	·	1.6 km	MPC · JPL
744669	2009 UR_{167}	—	October 16, 2009	Catalina	CSS	H	550 m	MPC · JPL
744670	2009 UU_{167}	—	January 2, 2014	Catalina	CSS	PHO	930 m	MPC · JPL
744671	2009 UV_{167}	—	June 14, 2018	Haleakala	Pan-STARRS 1	·	1.6 km	MPC · JPL
744672	2009 UL_{168}	—	August 8, 2016	Haleakala	Pan-STARRS 1	·	1.0 km	MPC · JPL
744673	2009 UQ_{170}	—	February 26, 2015	Mount Lemmon	Mount Lemmon Survey	·	1.0 km	MPC · JPL
744674	2009 UR_{172}	—	October 27, 2009	Kitt Peak	Spacewatch	PAD	1.2 km	MPC · JPL
744675	2009 UV_{175}	—	October 25, 2009	Kitt Peak	Spacewatch	PHO	770 m	MPC · JPL
744676	2009 UL_{176}	—	October 23, 2009	Kitt Peak	Spacewatch	MAS	470 m	MPC · JPL
744677	2009 UE_{177}	—	October 17, 2009	Mount Lemmon	Mount Lemmon Survey	·	1.4 km	MPC · JPL
744678	2009 UZ_{188}	—	October 18, 2009	Mount Lemmon	Mount Lemmon Survey	·	1.0 km	MPC · JPL
744679	2009 VS_{4}	—	September 22, 2009	Mount Lemmon	Mount Lemmon Survey	·	990 m	MPC · JPL
744680	2009 VC_{6}	—	October 24, 2009	Kitt Peak	Spacewatch	NYS	740 m	MPC · JPL
744681	2009 VC_{7}	—	September 23, 2009	Mount Lemmon	Mount Lemmon Survey	·	1.0 km	MPC · JPL
744682	2009 VN_{13}	—	November 8, 2009	Mount Lemmon	Mount Lemmon Survey	·	1.6 km	MPC · JPL
744683	2009 VX_{13}	—	October 24, 2009	Kitt Peak	Spacewatch	·	930 m	MPC · JPL
744684	2009 VF_{14}	—	November 8, 2009	Mount Lemmon	Mount Lemmon Survey	·	2.2 km	MPC · JPL
744685	2009 VN_{15}	—	October 24, 2009	Kitt Peak	Spacewatch	·	1.2 km	MPC · JPL
744686	2009 VM_{17}	—	February 25, 2007	Kitt Peak	Spacewatch	MAS	540 m	MPC · JPL
744687	2009 VQ_{21}	—	November 9, 2009	Mount Lemmon	Mount Lemmon Survey	·	1.6 km	MPC · JPL
744688	2009 VF_{28}	—	September 21, 2009	Mount Lemmon	Mount Lemmon Survey	·	1.1 km	MPC · JPL
744689	2009 VT_{34}	—	October 24, 2009	Kitt Peak	Spacewatch	·	1.9 km	MPC · JPL
744690	2009 VZ_{34}	—	February 23, 2007	Kitt Peak	Spacewatch	·	500 m	MPC · JPL
744691	2009 VJ_{36}	—	August 12, 2004	Palomar	NEAT	·	1.6 km	MPC · JPL
744692	2009 VJ_{40}	—	September 21, 2009	Mount Lemmon	Mount Lemmon Survey	·	900 m	MPC · JPL
744693	2009 VJ_{42}	—	October 24, 2009	Kitt Peak	Spacewatch	PHO	690 m	MPC · JPL
744694	2009 VM_{46}	—	September 22, 2009	Mount Lemmon	Mount Lemmon Survey	·	1.3 km	MPC · JPL
744695	2009 VV_{46}	—	November 9, 2009	Mount Lemmon	Mount Lemmon Survey	·	1.3 km	MPC · JPL
744696	2009 VB_{49}	—	November 11, 2009	Kitt Peak	Spacewatch	EOS	1.9 km	MPC · JPL
744697	2009 VK_{51}	—	November 8, 2009	Kitt Peak	Spacewatch	PHO	820 m	MPC · JPL
744698	2009 VJ_{65}	—	October 26, 2009	Kitt Peak	Spacewatch	·	940 m	MPC · JPL
744699	2009 VC_{73}	—	October 14, 2009	Mount Lemmon	Mount Lemmon Survey	DOR	1.8 km	MPC · JPL
744700	2009 VT_{74}	—	October 18, 2009	Catalina	CSS	H	370 m	MPC · JPL

== 744701–744800 ==
back to top

Designation			Discovery			Properties		Ref
Permanent	Provisional	Named after	Date	Site	Discoverer(s)	Category	Diam.	Ref
744701	2009 VY_{75}	—	October 22, 2009	Mount Lemmon	Mount Lemmon Survey	·	940 m	MPC · JPL
744702	2009 VM_{82}	—	November 8, 2009	Kitt Peak	Spacewatch	·	1.1 km	MPC · JPL
744703	2009 VB_{84}	—	November 9, 2009	Kitt Peak	Spacewatch	·	790 m	MPC · JPL
744704	2009 VH_{84}	—	September 17, 2003	Kitt Peak	Spacewatch	·	2.0 km	MPC · JPL
744705	2009 VS_{87}	—	November 10, 2009	Kitt Peak	Spacewatch	·	2.1 km	MPC · JPL
744706	2009 VW_{87}	—	November 10, 2009	Kitt Peak	Spacewatch	·	1.5 km	MPC · JPL
744707	2009 VX_{87}	—	November 10, 2009	Kitt Peak	Spacewatch	EOS	1.5 km	MPC · JPL
744708	2009 VL_{90}	—	November 11, 2009	Kitt Peak	Spacewatch	·	1.8 km	MPC · JPL
744709	2009 VY_{110}	—	November 10, 2009	Mount Lemmon	Mount Lemmon Survey	·	1.2 km	MPC · JPL
744710	2009 VQ_{112}	—	November 10, 2009	Catalina	CSS	·	2.1 km	MPC · JPL
744711	2009 VP_{115}	—	November 26, 2009	Mount Lemmon	Mount Lemmon Survey	·	1.3 km	MPC · JPL
744712	2009 VK_{121}	—	October 24, 2009	Kitt Peak	Spacewatch	·	720 m	MPC · JPL
744713	2009 VH_{122}	—	February 10, 2011	Mount Lemmon	Mount Lemmon Survey	·	990 m	MPC · JPL
744714	2009 VH_{126}	—	November 11, 2009	Kitt Peak	Spacewatch	·	1.6 km	MPC · JPL
744715	2009 VB_{127}	—	November 8, 2009	Mount Lemmon	Mount Lemmon Survey	V	530 m	MPC · JPL
744716	2009 VS_{127}	—	November 9, 2009	Mount Lemmon	Mount Lemmon Survey	L4	8.5 km	MPC · JPL
744717	2009 VK_{131}	—	November 8, 2009	Mount Lemmon	Mount Lemmon Survey	·	690 m	MPC · JPL
744718	2009 WX_{4}	—	November 16, 2009	Kitt Peak	Spacewatch	·	1.3 km	MPC · JPL
744719	2009 WG_{5}	—	November 16, 2009	Mount Lemmon	Mount Lemmon Survey	·	730 m	MPC · JPL
744720	2009 WJ_{7}	—	November 16, 2009	Kitt Peak	Spacewatch	HNS	960 m	MPC · JPL
744721	2009 WB_{12}	—	August 30, 2005	Kitt Peak	Spacewatch	NYS	820 m	MPC · JPL
744722	2009 WY_{28}	—	November 16, 2009	Kitt Peak	Spacewatch	·	1.1 km	MPC · JPL
744723	2009 WP_{29}	—	August 6, 2005	Palomar	NEAT	·	900 m	MPC · JPL
744724	2009 WC_{31}	—	November 16, 2009	Kitt Peak	Spacewatch	·	670 m	MPC · JPL
744725	2009 WO_{37}	—	October 24, 2005	Kitt Peak	Spacewatch	·	950 m	MPC · JPL
744726	2009 WE_{41}	—	November 17, 2009	Kitt Peak	Spacewatch	·	700 m	MPC · JPL
744727	2009 WF_{45}	—	November 18, 2009	Kitt Peak	Spacewatch	EUN	1.2 km	MPC · JPL
744728	2009 WH_{54}	—	November 8, 2018	Mount Lemmon	Mount Lemmon Survey	·	1.9 km	MPC · JPL
744729	2009 WN_{54}	—	October 22, 2009	Mount Lemmon	Mount Lemmon Survey	·	1.8 km	MPC · JPL
744730	2009 WG_{58}	—	November 16, 2009	Mount Lemmon	Mount Lemmon Survey	·	620 m	MPC · JPL
744731	2009 WB_{59}	—	April 2, 2006	Kitt Peak	Spacewatch	THM	2.2 km	MPC · JPL
744732	2009 WQ_{59}	—	October 22, 2009	Mount Lemmon	Mount Lemmon Survey	·	1.2 km	MPC · JPL
744733	2009 WA_{62}	—	November 16, 2009	Mount Lemmon	Mount Lemmon Survey	·	900 m	MPC · JPL
744734	2009 WP_{63}	—	November 16, 2009	Mount Lemmon	Mount Lemmon Survey	·	660 m	MPC · JPL
744735	2009 WM_{64}	—	November 16, 2009	Mount Lemmon	Mount Lemmon Survey	·	1.9 km	MPC · JPL
744736	2009 WN_{65}	—	November 17, 2009	Mount Lemmon	Mount Lemmon Survey	MAS	550 m	MPC · JPL
744737	2009 WL_{68}	—	November 17, 2009	Mount Lemmon	Mount Lemmon Survey	·	1.6 km	MPC · JPL
744738	2009 WC_{75}	—	November 18, 2009	Kitt Peak	Spacewatch	·	1.8 km	MPC · JPL
744739	2009 WE_{75}	—	September 23, 2005	Kitt Peak	Spacewatch	NYS	910 m	MPC · JPL
744740	2009 WM_{80}	—	November 18, 2009	Kitt Peak	Spacewatch	·	830 m	MPC · JPL
744741	2009 WQ_{84}	—	November 11, 2009	Kitt Peak	Spacewatch	·	1.4 km	MPC · JPL
744742	2009 WY_{86}	—	November 11, 2009	Kitt Peak	Spacewatch	·	720 m	MPC · JPL
744743	2009 WS_{87}	—	November 9, 2009	Mount Lemmon	Mount Lemmon Survey	·	930 m	MPC · JPL
744744	2009 WE_{89}	—	November 19, 2009	Kitt Peak	Spacewatch	·	690 m	MPC · JPL
744745	2009 WZ_{94}	—	November 20, 2009	Mount Lemmon	Mount Lemmon Survey	·	960 m	MPC · JPL
744746	2009 WH_{95}	—	October 1, 2005	Mount Lemmon	Mount Lemmon Survey	·	1.5 km	MPC · JPL
744747	2009 WJ_{96}	—	October 25, 2009	Kitt Peak	Spacewatch	·	1.1 km	MPC · JPL
744748	2009 WZ_{98}	—	October 24, 2009	Kitt Peak	Spacewatch	·	870 m	MPC · JPL
744749	2009 WT_{100}	—	October 12, 2009	Mount Lemmon	Mount Lemmon Survey	BRA	1.3 km	MPC · JPL
744750	2009 WU_{101}	—	September 28, 2009	Mount Lemmon	Mount Lemmon Survey	·	540 m	MPC · JPL
744751	2009 WV_{103}	—	November 10, 2009	Kitt Peak	Spacewatch	NAE	1.8 km	MPC · JPL
744752	2009 WL_{107}	—	October 23, 2009	Mount Lemmon	Mount Lemmon Survey	·	850 m	MPC · JPL
744753	2009 WD_{108}	—	November 17, 2009	Mount Lemmon	Mount Lemmon Survey	·	1.4 km	MPC · JPL
744754	2009 WM_{110}	—	November 17, 2009	Mount Lemmon	Mount Lemmon Survey	·	1.6 km	MPC · JPL
744755	2009 WC_{112}	—	November 17, 2009	Mount Lemmon	Mount Lemmon Survey	·	950 m	MPC · JPL
744756	2009 WM_{116}	—	November 20, 2009	Kitt Peak	Spacewatch	·	1.2 km	MPC · JPL
744757	2009 WO_{117}	—	October 23, 2009	Kitt Peak	Spacewatch	·	1.0 km	MPC · JPL
744758	2009 WJ_{121}	—	October 21, 2009	Mount Lemmon	Mount Lemmon Survey	MAS	520 m	MPC · JPL
744759	2009 WZ_{123}	—	November 20, 2009	Mount Lemmon	Mount Lemmon Survey	H	470 m	MPC · JPL
744760	2009 WD_{125}	—	November 20, 2009	Kitt Peak	Spacewatch	VER	2.0 km	MPC · JPL
744761	2009 WC_{127}	—	November 20, 2009	Kitt Peak	Spacewatch	AGN	1.0 km	MPC · JPL
744762	2009 WM_{150}	—	October 12, 2009	Mount Lemmon	Mount Lemmon Survey	·	650 m	MPC · JPL
744763	2009 WE_{158}	—	November 20, 2009	Mount Lemmon	Mount Lemmon Survey	·	1.2 km	MPC · JPL
744764	2009 WX_{163}	—	October 20, 1998	Kitt Peak	Spacewatch	·	710 m	MPC · JPL
744765	2009 WO_{168}	—	November 10, 2009	Kitt Peak	Spacewatch	·	920 m	MPC · JPL
744766	2009 WS_{171}	—	August 31, 2005	Kitt Peak	Spacewatch	·	820 m	MPC · JPL
744767	2009 WQ_{173}	—	November 9, 2009	Mount Lemmon	Mount Lemmon Survey	·	1.0 km	MPC · JPL
744768	2009 WQ_{175}	—	November 23, 2009	Kitt Peak	Spacewatch	·	2.9 km	MPC · JPL
744769	2009 WZ_{177}	—	November 23, 2009	Mount Lemmon	Mount Lemmon Survey	·	710 m	MPC · JPL
744770	2009 WG_{178}	—	November 23, 2009	Mount Lemmon	Mount Lemmon Survey	·	1.6 km	MPC · JPL
744771	2009 WM_{182}	—	October 25, 2003	Kitt Peak	Spacewatch	·	2.4 km	MPC · JPL
744772	2009 WO_{190}	—	May 31, 2008	Kitt Peak	Spacewatch	H	430 m	MPC · JPL
744773	2009 WR_{191}	—	November 24, 2009	Mount Lemmon	Mount Lemmon Survey	NYS	850 m	MPC · JPL
744774	2009 WD_{194}	—	November 24, 2009	Kitt Peak	Spacewatch	·	1.7 km	MPC · JPL
744775	2009 WM_{194}	—	November 17, 2009	Mount Lemmon	Mount Lemmon Survey	·	1.9 km	MPC · JPL
744776	2009 WT_{196}	—	November 25, 2009	Mount Lemmon	Mount Lemmon Survey	·	2.1 km	MPC · JPL
744777	2009 WT_{199}	—	November 18, 2009	Mount Lemmon	Mount Lemmon Survey	·	1.2 km	MPC · JPL
744778	2009 WP_{204}	—	September 19, 2009	Mount Lemmon	Mount Lemmon Survey	·	1.1 km	MPC · JPL
744779	2009 WN_{210}	—	November 18, 2009	Kitt Peak	Spacewatch	·	1.3 km	MPC · JPL
744780	2009 WY_{212}	—	November 18, 2009	Kitt Peak	Spacewatch	·	1.1 km	MPC · JPL
744781	2009 WJ_{213}	—	November 18, 2009	Kitt Peak	Spacewatch	·	830 m	MPC · JPL
744782	2009 WH_{214}	—	September 29, 2009	Catalina	CSS	·	880 m	MPC · JPL
744783	2009 WA_{223}	—	November 16, 2009	Mount Lemmon	Mount Lemmon Survey	TIR	2.2 km	MPC · JPL
744784	2009 WK_{225}	—	October 23, 2009	Mount Lemmon	Mount Lemmon Survey	·	1.4 km	MPC · JPL
744785	2009 WM_{225}	—	November 17, 2009	Kitt Peak	Spacewatch	·	2.2 km	MPC · JPL
744786	2009 WK_{228}	—	November 17, 2009	Mount Lemmon	Mount Lemmon Survey	·	900 m	MPC · JPL
744787	2009 WB_{229}	—	October 14, 2009	Mount Lemmon	Mount Lemmon Survey	·	2.4 km	MPC · JPL
744788	2009 WD_{240}	—	November 17, 2009	Kitt Peak	Spacewatch	·	940 m	MPC · JPL
744789	2009 WG_{243}	—	November 19, 2009	Kitt Peak	Spacewatch	·	1.1 km	MPC · JPL
744790	2009 WP_{248}	—	November 17, 2009	Mount Lemmon	Mount Lemmon Survey	·	500 m	MPC · JPL
744791	2009 WS_{255}	—	November 20, 2009	Kitt Peak	Spacewatch	·	880 m	MPC · JPL
744792	2009 WN_{264}	—	November 11, 2009	Kitt Peak	Spacewatch	·	860 m	MPC · JPL
744793	2009 WF_{265}	—	October 23, 2009	Mount Lemmon	Mount Lemmon Survey	EOS	1.9 km	MPC · JPL
744794	2009 WG_{271}	—	December 13, 2010	Mount Lemmon	Mount Lemmon Survey	·	2.8 km	MPC · JPL
744795	2009 WM_{272}	—	April 6, 2011	Mount Lemmon	Mount Lemmon Survey	·	760 m	MPC · JPL
744796	2009 WW_{272}	—	September 14, 2014	Haleakala	Pan-STARRS 1	·	3.3 km	MPC · JPL
744797	2009 WE_{274}	—	November 17, 2009	Kitt Peak	Spacewatch	·	880 m	MPC · JPL
744798	2009 WO_{274}	—	March 28, 2014	Mount Lemmon	Mount Lemmon Survey	·	800 m	MPC · JPL
744799	2009 WR_{274}	—	August 24, 2012	Kitt Peak	Spacewatch	·	560 m	MPC · JPL
744800	2009 WW_{274}	—	April 15, 2012	Haleakala	Pan-STARRS 1	EOS	1.5 km	MPC · JPL

== 744801–744900 ==
back to top

Designation			Discovery			Properties		Ref
Permanent	Provisional	Named after	Date	Site	Discoverer(s)	Category	Diam.	Ref
744801	2009 WL_{275}	—	October 24, 2009	Kitt Peak	Spacewatch	·	1.8 km	MPC · JPL
744802	2009 WB_{279}	—	October 12, 2009	Mount Lemmon	Mount Lemmon Survey	EOS	1.3 km	MPC · JPL
744803	2009 WL_{279}	—	November 23, 2009	Mount Lemmon	Mount Lemmon Survey	·	3.0 km	MPC · JPL
744804	2009 WR_{279}	—	October 25, 2014	Mount Lemmon	Mount Lemmon Survey	·	1.5 km	MPC · JPL
744805	2009 WL_{281}	—	September 20, 2014	Haleakala	Pan-STARRS 1	·	2.3 km	MPC · JPL
744806	2009 WT_{281}	—	December 31, 2013	Haleakala	Pan-STARRS 1	·	980 m	MPC · JPL
744807	2009 WB_{282}	—	April 30, 2012	Mount Lemmon	Mount Lemmon Survey	·	1.7 km	MPC · JPL
744808	2009 WE_{282}	—	August 14, 2013	Haleakala	Pan-STARRS 1	·	1.5 km	MPC · JPL
744809	2009 WM_{284}	—	April 15, 2012	Haleakala	Pan-STARRS 1	(1118)	2.4 km	MPC · JPL
744810	2009 WR_{286}	—	November 20, 2009	Mount Lemmon	Mount Lemmon Survey	·	2.0 km	MPC · JPL
744811	2009 WP_{289}	—	November 27, 2009	Kitt Peak	Spacewatch	·	2.6 km	MPC · JPL
744812	2009 WD_{291}	—	November 25, 2009	Kitt Peak	Spacewatch	NYS	960 m	MPC · JPL
744813	2009 XC	—	November 8, 2009	Kitt Peak	Spacewatch	·	1.3 km	MPC · JPL
744814	2009 XN_{4}	—	October 24, 2005	Kitt Peak	Spacewatch	·	880 m	MPC · JPL
744815	2009 XQ_{6}	—	July 10, 2012	Westfield	R. Holmes	·	860 m	MPC · JPL
744816	2009 XA_{10}	—	September 17, 2009	Kitt Peak	Spacewatch	·	1.1 km	MPC · JPL
744817	2009 XM_{10}	—	November 19, 2009	Kitt Peak	Spacewatch	·	780 m	MPC · JPL
744818	2009 XT_{13}	—	October 25, 2005	Kitt Peak	Spacewatch	·	990 m	MPC · JPL
744819	2009 XG_{16}	—	October 26, 2005	Kitt Peak	Spacewatch	·	820 m	MPC · JPL
744820	2009 XG_{17}	—	December 15, 2009	Mount Lemmon	Mount Lemmon Survey	·	1.1 km	MPC · JPL
744821	2009 XB_{20}	—	December 15, 2009	Mount Lemmon	Mount Lemmon Survey	·	1.5 km	MPC · JPL
744822	2009 XT_{21}	—	November 21, 2009	Mount Lemmon	Mount Lemmon Survey	H	520 m	MPC · JPL
744823	2009 XH_{24}	—	November 20, 2003	Kitt Peak	Spacewatch	·	4.1 km	MPC · JPL
744824	2009 XJ_{26}	—	December 15, 2009	Mount Lemmon	Mount Lemmon Survey	·	850 m	MPC · JPL
744825	2009 XJ_{27}	—	October 10, 2012	Mount Lemmon	Mount Lemmon Survey	·	650 m	MPC · JPL
744826	2009 XB_{30}	—	December 10, 2009	Mount Lemmon	Mount Lemmon Survey	·	1.5 km	MPC · JPL
744827	2009 XU_{30}	—	December 15, 2009	Mount Lemmon	Mount Lemmon Survey	H	410 m	MPC · JPL
744828	2009 YN_{4}	—	December 17, 2009	Mount Lemmon	Mount Lemmon Survey	·	910 m	MPC · JPL
744829	2009 YD_{9}	—	August 31, 2005	Kitt Peak	Spacewatch	·	740 m	MPC · JPL
744830	2009 YY_{12}	—	December 18, 2009	Mount Lemmon	Mount Lemmon Survey	·	2.3 km	MPC · JPL
744831	2009 YJ_{19}	—	November 23, 2009	Kitt Peak	Spacewatch	EOS	1.7 km	MPC · JPL
744832	2009 YO_{23}	—	December 20, 2009	Mount Lemmon	Mount Lemmon Survey	·	2.4 km	MPC · JPL
744833	2009 YR_{23}	—	September 6, 2005	Anderson Mesa	LONEOS	·	1.2 km	MPC · JPL
744834	2009 YG_{27}	—	March 30, 2015	Haleakala	Pan-STARRS 1	V	610 m	MPC · JPL
744835	2009 YD_{28}	—	December 17, 2009	Kitt Peak	Spacewatch	·	890 m	MPC · JPL
744836	2009 YR_{28}	—	December 19, 2009	Mount Lemmon	Mount Lemmon Survey	·	2.6 km	MPC · JPL
744837	2009 YX_{30}	—	December 17, 2009	Mount Lemmon	Mount Lemmon Survey	·	3.2 km	MPC · JPL
744838	2009 YQ_{32}	—	December 18, 2009	Kitt Peak	Spacewatch	·	2.2 km	MPC · JPL
744839	2010 AN_{8}	—	January 6, 2010	Catalina	CSS	·	1.3 km	MPC · JPL
744840	2010 AK_{9}	—	January 6, 2010	Kitt Peak	Spacewatch	EOS	1.5 km	MPC · JPL
744841	2010 AC_{13}	—	November 17, 2009	Mount Lemmon	Mount Lemmon Survey	·	1.0 km	MPC · JPL
744842	2010 AT_{13}	—	January 7, 2010	Kitt Peak	Spacewatch	EOS	1.7 km	MPC · JPL
744843	2010 AA_{17}	—	November 23, 2009	Mount Lemmon	Mount Lemmon Survey	·	3.0 km	MPC · JPL
744844	2010 AB_{18}	—	January 7, 2010	Mount Lemmon	Mount Lemmon Survey	MAS	520 m	MPC · JPL
744845	2010 AW_{53}	—	January 8, 2010	Kitt Peak	Spacewatch	·	830 m	MPC · JPL
744846	2010 AW_{78}	—	January 6, 2010	Catalina	CSS	PHO	1.1 km	MPC · JPL
744847	2010 AD_{158}	—	January 17, 2016	Haleakala	Pan-STARRS 1	URS	2.6 km	MPC · JPL
744848	2010 AF_{158}	—	May 24, 2011	Haleakala	Pan-STARRS 1	·	860 m	MPC · JPL
744849	2010 AT_{158}	—	March 9, 2014	Haleakala	Pan-STARRS 1	·	690 m	MPC · JPL
744850	2010 AJ_{162}	—	January 8, 2010	Mount Lemmon	Mount Lemmon Survey	·	1.8 km	MPC · JPL
744851	2010 AL_{166}	—	January 7, 2010	Mount Lemmon	Mount Lemmon Survey	·	1.1 km	MPC · JPL
744852	2010 BB_{3}	—	January 21, 2010	La Sagra	OAM	AMO	320 m	MPC · JPL
744853	2010 BL_{132}	—	October 2, 2016	Mount Lemmon	Mount Lemmon Survey	KON	2.2 km	MPC · JPL
744854	2010 BN_{148}	—	October 12, 2014	Mount Lemmon	Mount Lemmon Survey	·	1.4 km	MPC · JPL
744855	2010 CP_{4}	—	January 11, 2010	Kitt Peak	Spacewatch	HNS	1.1 km	MPC · JPL
744856	2010 CY_{23}	—	January 7, 2010	Kitt Peak	Spacewatch	·	840 m	MPC · JPL
744857	2010 CZ_{29}	—	February 4, 2000	Kitt Peak	Spacewatch	·	470 m	MPC · JPL
744858	2010 CP_{33}	—	February 10, 2010	Kitt Peak	Spacewatch	·	800 m	MPC · JPL
744859	2010 CO_{37}	—	February 13, 2010	Mount Lemmon	Mount Lemmon Survey	·	1.1 km	MPC · JPL
744860	2010 CT_{42}	—	December 25, 2005	Catalina	CSS	·	1.3 km	MPC · JPL
744861	2010 CF_{58}	—	February 24, 2006	Catalina	CSS	·	1.2 km	MPC · JPL
744862	2010 CX_{68}	—	February 10, 2010	Kitt Peak	Spacewatch	H	350 m	MPC · JPL
744863	2010 CR_{72}	—	January 7, 2010	Kitt Peak	Spacewatch	·	2.6 km	MPC · JPL
744864	2010 CM_{74}	—	January 11, 2010	Kitt Peak	Spacewatch	·	2.5 km	MPC · JPL
744865	2010 CF_{77}	—	February 13, 2010	Mount Lemmon	Mount Lemmon Survey	H	430 m	MPC · JPL
744866	2010 CA_{85}	—	February 14, 2010	Kitt Peak	Spacewatch	URS	2.9 km	MPC · JPL
744867	2010 CT_{89}	—	February 14, 2010	Mount Lemmon	Mount Lemmon Survey	·	1.4 km	MPC · JPL
744868	2010 CD_{91}	—	January 23, 2006	Mount Lemmon	Mount Lemmon Survey	(194)	1.4 km	MPC · JPL
744869	2010 CZ_{95}	—	February 14, 2010	Mount Lemmon	Mount Lemmon Survey	(194)	1.1 km	MPC · JPL
744870	2010 CV_{103}	—	February 14, 2010	Kitt Peak	Spacewatch	·	1.3 km	MPC · JPL
744871	2010 CC_{107}	—	February 14, 2010	Mount Lemmon	Mount Lemmon Survey	·	2.8 km	MPC · JPL
744872	2010 CB_{113}	—	March 4, 2006	Kitt Peak	Spacewatch	·	870 m	MPC · JPL
744873	2010 CX_{119}	—	February 2, 1997	Kitt Peak	Spacewatch	H	430 m	MPC · JPL
744874	2010 CT_{140}	—	January 7, 2006	Mount Lemmon	Mount Lemmon Survey	·	1.3 km	MPC · JPL
744875	2010 CL_{151}	—	February 14, 2010	Kitt Peak	Spacewatch	·	1.3 km	MPC · JPL
744876	2010 CC_{155}	—	February 15, 2010	Kitt Peak	Spacewatch	·	1.1 km	MPC · JPL
744877	2010 CB_{163}	—	February 9, 2010	Kitt Peak	Spacewatch	·	600 m	MPC · JPL
744878	2010 CR_{168}	—	August 7, 2008	Kitt Peak	Spacewatch	·	1.3 km	MPC · JPL
744879	2010 CV_{168}	—	October 2, 2003	Kitt Peak	Spacewatch	·	1.7 km	MPC · JPL
744880	2010 CY_{250}	—	October 10, 2008	Mount Lemmon	Mount Lemmon Survey	·	1.4 km	MPC · JPL
744881	2010 CF_{261}	—	January 11, 2016	Haleakala	Pan-STARRS 1	·	1.7 km	MPC · JPL
744882	2010 CF_{270}	—	February 15, 2010	Catalina	CSS	·	1.0 km	MPC · JPL
744883	2010 CK_{270}	—	October 22, 2012	Haleakala	Pan-STARRS 1	·	1.1 km	MPC · JPL
744884	2010 CC_{271}	—	February 26, 2014	Haleakala	Pan-STARRS 1	NYS	1.1 km	MPC · JPL
744885	2010 CH_{272}	—	October 28, 2003	Bergisch Gladbach	W. Bickel	·	2.1 km	MPC · JPL
744886	2010 CJ_{272}	—	February 14, 2010	Mount Lemmon	Mount Lemmon Survey	·	1.2 km	MPC · JPL
744887	2010 CA_{273}	—	August 13, 2012	Haleakala	Pan-STARRS 1	·	2.6 km	MPC · JPL
744888	2010 CR_{273}	—	January 24, 2014	Haleakala	Pan-STARRS 1	·	1.1 km	MPC · JPL
744889	2010 DD_{1}	—	February 16, 2010	Mount Lemmon	Mount Lemmon Survey	H	400 m	MPC · JPL
744890	2010 DP_{3}	—	February 16, 2010	Kitt Peak	Spacewatch	·	520 m	MPC · JPL
744891	2010 DT_{8}	—	February 16, 2010	Kitt Peak	Spacewatch	·	1.3 km	MPC · JPL
744892	2010 DG_{9}	—	February 16, 2010	Mount Lemmon	Mount Lemmon Survey	·	1.3 km	MPC · JPL
744893	2010 DV_{9}	—	February 16, 2010	Mount Lemmon	Mount Lemmon Survey	NYS	730 m	MPC · JPL
744894	2010 DM_{34}	—	February 16, 2010	Mount Lemmon	Mount Lemmon Survey	H	590 m	MPC · JPL
744895	2010 DF_{38}	—	February 16, 2010	Mount Lemmon	Mount Lemmon Survey	·	1.2 km	MPC · JPL
744896	2010 DF_{40}	—	February 16, 2010	Mount Lemmon	Mount Lemmon Survey	·	1.0 km	MPC · JPL
744897	2010 DB_{43}	—	February 17, 2010	Kitt Peak	Spacewatch	·	1.2 km	MPC · JPL
744898	2010 DF_{44}	—	February 17, 2010	Kitt Peak	Spacewatch	·	1.4 km	MPC · JPL
744899	2010 DZ_{46}	—	February 17, 2010	Kitt Peak	Spacewatch	·	580 m	MPC · JPL
744900	2010 DZ_{74}	—	February 17, 2010	Kitt Peak	Spacewatch	·	530 m	MPC · JPL

== 744901–745000 ==
back to top

Designation			Discovery			Properties		Ref
Permanent	Provisional	Named after	Date	Site	Discoverer(s)	Category	Diam.	Ref
744901	2010 DG_{94}	—	June 3, 2016	Mount Lemmon	Mount Lemmon Survey	·	2.4 km	MPC · JPL
744902	2010 DP_{104}	—	April 28, 2014	Cerro Tololo	DECam	·	1.0 km	MPC · JPL
744903	2010 DF_{105}	—	March 11, 2011	Kitt Peak	Spacewatch	·	3.1 km	MPC · JPL
744904	2010 DZ_{106}	—	March 5, 2016	Haleakala	Pan-STARRS 1	·	2.3 km	MPC · JPL
744905	2010 DZ_{107}	—	October 2, 2013	Haleakala	Pan-STARRS 1	·	2.8 km	MPC · JPL
744906	2010 DQ_{108}	—	July 13, 2013	Mount Lemmon	Mount Lemmon Survey	·	2.3 km	MPC · JPL
744907	2010 DE_{113}	—	February 18, 2010	Mount Lemmon	Mount Lemmon Survey	·	2.2 km	MPC · JPL
744908	2010 EC_{29}	—	March 4, 2010	Kitt Peak	Spacewatch	·	1.2 km	MPC · JPL
744909	2010 EB_{31}	—	February 15, 2010	Mount Lemmon	Mount Lemmon Survey	(895)	3.4 km	MPC · JPL
744910	2010 EF_{31}	—	February 16, 2010	Kitt Peak	Spacewatch	·	2.5 km	MPC · JPL
744911	2010 EF_{38}	—	March 12, 2010	Kitt Peak	Spacewatch	TIR	2.3 km	MPC · JPL
744912	2010 ET_{41}	—	February 17, 2010	Kitt Peak	Spacewatch	NYS	970 m	MPC · JPL
744913	2010 EX_{44}	—	January 27, 2006	Mount Lemmon	Mount Lemmon Survey	·	1.2 km	MPC · JPL
744914	2010 EJ_{66}	—	March 12, 2010	Kitt Peak	Spacewatch	MAS	680 m	MPC · JPL
744915	2010 EP_{70}	—	March 12, 2010	Kitt Peak	Spacewatch	·	940 m	MPC · JPL
744916	2010 EQ_{75}	—	March 12, 2010	Mount Lemmon	Mount Lemmon Survey	HNS	1.1 km	MPC · JPL
744917	2010 EC_{85}	—	February 16, 2010	Mount Lemmon	Mount Lemmon Survey	·	600 m	MPC · JPL
744918	2010 EP_{88}	—	February 15, 2010	Catalina	CSS	H	500 m	MPC · JPL
744919	2010 EP_{93}	—	March 14, 2010	Mount Lemmon	Mount Lemmon Survey	MAS	510 m	MPC · JPL
744920	2010 EX_{93}	—	September 24, 2005	Kitt Peak	Spacewatch	·	540 m	MPC · JPL
744921	2010 EW_{99}	—	March 14, 2010	Kitt Peak	Spacewatch	·	2.3 km	MPC · JPL
744922	2010 ER_{100}	—	March 15, 2010	Kitt Peak	Spacewatch	·	1.4 km	MPC · JPL
744923	2010 EN_{136}	—	March 13, 2010	Mount Lemmon	Mount Lemmon Survey	·	1.0 km	MPC · JPL
744924	2010 EV_{141}	—	March 13, 2010	Kitt Peak	Spacewatch	·	840 m	MPC · JPL
744925	2010 ER_{176}	—	March 30, 2011	Mount Lemmon	Mount Lemmon Survey	·	2.5 km	MPC · JPL
744926	2010 EW_{188}	—	March 15, 2010	Mount Lemmon	Mount Lemmon Survey	·	1.1 km	MPC · JPL
744927	2010 EA_{190}	—	January 28, 2017	Mount Lemmon	Mount Lemmon Survey	PHO	700 m	MPC · JPL
744928	2010 ER_{190}	—	March 4, 2010	Kitt Peak	Spacewatch	H	420 m	MPC · JPL
744929	2010 FE_{1}	—	March 16, 2010	Mount Lemmon	Mount Lemmon Survey	·	990 m	MPC · JPL
744930	2010 FJ_{24}	—	March 18, 2010	Mount Lemmon	Mount Lemmon Survey	·	880 m	MPC · JPL
744931	2010 FG_{29}	—	February 16, 2010	Kitt Peak	Spacewatch	JUN	790 m	MPC · JPL
744932	2010 FT_{87}	—	March 17, 2010	Kitt Peak	Spacewatch	TIR	2.3 km	MPC · JPL
744933	2010 FF_{95}	—	March 25, 2010	Kitt Peak	Spacewatch	·	2.4 km	MPC · JPL
744934	2010 FK_{95}	—	March 25, 2010	Mount Lemmon	Mount Lemmon Survey	MAR	970 m	MPC · JPL
744935	2010 FV_{126}	—	January 28, 2015	Haleakala	Pan-STARRS 1	·	1.6 km	MPC · JPL
744936	2010 FM_{134}	—	November 1, 2013	Kitt Peak	Spacewatch	ADE	1.3 km	MPC · JPL
744937	2010 FZ_{137}	—	March 10, 2015	Haleakala	Pan-STARRS 1	·	2.9 km	MPC · JPL
744938	2010 FY_{139}	—	November 23, 2012	Kitt Peak	Spacewatch	·	1.4 km	MPC · JPL
744939	2010 FC_{140}	—	June 17, 2006	Kitt Peak	Spacewatch	·	1.2 km	MPC · JPL
744940	2010 FF_{140}	—	March 18, 2010	Mount Lemmon	Mount Lemmon Survey	·	1.9 km	MPC · JPL
744941	2010 FJ_{140}	—	March 19, 2010	Mount Lemmon	Mount Lemmon Survey	·	1.4 km	MPC · JPL
744942	2010 FO_{140}	—	March 20, 2010	Kitt Peak	Spacewatch	·	1.1 km	MPC · JPL
744943	2010 FR_{140}	—	October 11, 2017	Mount Lemmon	Mount Lemmon Survey	HNS	1.1 km	MPC · JPL
744944	2010 FJ_{142}	—	January 14, 2015	Haleakala	Pan-STARRS 1	·	2.0 km	MPC · JPL
744945	2010 FF_{143}	—	January 23, 2015	Haleakala	Pan-STARRS 1	·	1.8 km	MPC · JPL
744946	2010 GN_{26}	—	April 4, 2010	Kitt Peak	Spacewatch	·	1.2 km	MPC · JPL
744947	2010 GJ_{27}	—	April 5, 2010	Mount Lemmon	Mount Lemmon Survey	JUN	690 m	MPC · JPL
744948	2010 GS_{30}	—	September 27, 2003	Kitt Peak	Spacewatch	H	430 m	MPC · JPL
744949	2010 GD_{67}	—	April 12, 2010	Kitt Peak	Spacewatch	H	530 m	MPC · JPL
744950	2010 GE_{99}	—	March 18, 2010	Kitt Peak	Spacewatch	·	970 m	MPC · JPL
744951	2010 GM_{100}	—	April 5, 2010	Kitt Peak	Spacewatch	·	1.2 km	MPC · JPL
744952	2010 GP_{105}	—	February 14, 2010	Mount Lemmon	Mount Lemmon Survey	·	1.6 km	MPC · JPL
744953	2010 GF_{109}	—	April 8, 2010	Mount Lemmon	Mount Lemmon Survey	·	1.6 km	MPC · JPL
744954	2010 GF_{115}	—	August 9, 2007	Kitt Peak	Spacewatch	NYS	770 m	MPC · JPL
744955	2010 GD_{116}	—	April 6, 1994	Kitt Peak	Spacewatch	·	2.1 km	MPC · JPL
744956	2010 GO_{141}	—	April 9, 2010	Mount Lemmon	Mount Lemmon Survey	·	920 m	MPC · JPL
744957	2010 GD_{160}	—	April 7, 2010	Mount Lemmon	Mount Lemmon Survey	H	440 m	MPC · JPL
744958	2010 GY_{177}	—	October 7, 2012	Haleakala	Pan-STARRS 1	L5	9.0 km	MPC · JPL
744959	2010 GM_{181}	—	August 28, 2016	Mount Lemmon	Mount Lemmon Survey	·	1.1 km	MPC · JPL
744960	2010 GA_{184}	—	February 11, 2016	Haleakala	Pan-STARRS 1	·	1.8 km	MPC · JPL
744961	2010 GH_{189}	—	April 20, 2015	Haleakala	Pan-STARRS 1	·	1.2 km	MPC · JPL
744962	2010 GH_{199}	—	May 25, 2014	Haleakala	Pan-STARRS 1	·	940 m	MPC · JPL
744963	2010 GS_{199}	—	March 18, 2013	Mount Lemmon	Mount Lemmon Survey	·	550 m	MPC · JPL
744964	2010 GB_{200}	—	August 14, 2012	Kitt Peak	Spacewatch	·	2.5 km	MPC · JPL
744965	2010 GD_{200}	—	April 15, 2010	Mount Lemmon	Mount Lemmon Survey	·	860 m	MPC · JPL
744966	2010 GJ_{200}	—	April 13, 2010	Mount Lemmon	Mount Lemmon Survey	·	1.4 km	MPC · JPL
744967	2010 GJ_{201}	—	February 14, 2013	Haleakala	Pan-STARRS 1	·	530 m	MPC · JPL
744968	2010 GK_{201}	—	April 9, 2010	Mount Lemmon	Mount Lemmon Survey	·	1.1 km	MPC · JPL
744969	2010 GY_{202}	—	February 12, 2018	Haleakala	Pan-STARRS 1	H	390 m	MPC · JPL
744970	2010 GK_{203}	—	April 6, 2010	Kitt Peak	Spacewatch	·	1.6 km	MPC · JPL
744971	2010 GB_{212}	—	April 10, 2010	Mount Lemmon	Mount Lemmon Survey	·	1.6 km	MPC · JPL
744972	2010 HU_{76}	—	April 17, 2010	Mount Lemmon	Mount Lemmon Survey	·	2.1 km	MPC · JPL
744973	2010 HT_{138}	—	October 7, 2012	Haleakala	Pan-STARRS 1	·	2.2 km	MPC · JPL
744974	2010 HA_{139}	—	October 9, 2012	Haleakala	Pan-STARRS 1	·	2.2 km	MPC · JPL
744975	2010 HB_{139}	—	October 6, 2012	Haleakala	Pan-STARRS 1	EUN	960 m	MPC · JPL
744976	2010 HK_{139}	—	January 8, 2015	Haleakala	Pan-STARRS 1	H	410 m	MPC · JPL
744977	2010 JO_{15}	—	May 7, 2010	Mount Lemmon	Mount Lemmon Survey	H	470 m	MPC · JPL
744978	2010 JJ_{37}	—	April 5, 2010	Kitt Peak	Spacewatch	H	480 m	MPC · JPL
744979	2010 JF_{39}	—	May 6, 2010	Mount Lemmon	Mount Lemmon Survey	·	2.7 km	MPC · JPL
744980	2010 JH_{43}	—	May 3, 2010	Kitt Peak	Spacewatch	JUN	840 m	MPC · JPL
744981	2010 JM_{71}	—	May 11, 2010	Nogales	M. Schwartz, P. R. Holvorcem	H	500 m	MPC · JPL
744982	2010 JB_{76}	—	April 10, 2010	Mount Lemmon	Mount Lemmon Survey	·	620 m	MPC · JPL
744983	2010 JL_{115}	—	May 9, 2010	Catalina	CSS	·	1.5 km	MPC · JPL
744984	2010 JM_{120}	—	August 19, 2006	Kitt Peak	Spacewatch	·	1.4 km	MPC · JPL
744985	2010 JR_{148}	—	May 4, 2010	Kitt Peak	Spacewatch	JUN	990 m	MPC · JPL
744986	2010 JF_{150}	—	April 6, 2010	Kitt Peak	Spacewatch	·	530 m	MPC · JPL
744987	2010 JY_{156}	—	May 11, 2010	Mount Lemmon	Mount Lemmon Survey	H	480 m	MPC · JPL
744988	2010 JR_{158}	—	April 11, 2010	Mount Lemmon	Mount Lemmon Survey	·	1.4 km	MPC · JPL
744989	2010 JC_{165}	—	April 10, 2010	Mount Lemmon	Mount Lemmon Survey	EUN	880 m	MPC · JPL
744990	2010 JL_{176}	—	May 12, 2010	Mount Lemmon	Mount Lemmon Survey	H	550 m	MPC · JPL
744991	2010 JS_{187}	—	May 6, 2010	WISE	WISE	·	1.0 km	MPC · JPL
744992	2010 JK_{188}	—	April 30, 2005	Kitt Peak	Spacewatch	·	1.1 km	MPC · JPL
744993	2010 JL_{189}	—	June 11, 2015	Haleakala	Pan-STARRS 1	·	2.4 km	MPC · JPL
744994	2010 JE_{196}	—	November 10, 2017	Haleakala	Pan-STARRS 1	(7605)	2.9 km	MPC · JPL
744995	2010 JB_{200}	—	May 12, 2010	WISE	WISE	·	1.4 km	MPC · JPL
744996	2010 JG_{204}	—	October 15, 2015	Haleakala	Pan-STARRS 1	·	1.6 km	MPC · JPL
744997	2010 JP_{205}	—	March 12, 2016	Haleakala	Pan-STARRS 1	·	2.2 km	MPC · JPL
744998	2010 JU_{210}	—	May 11, 2010	Mount Lemmon	Mount Lemmon Survey	·	980 m	MPC · JPL
744999	2010 JB_{211}	—	April 12, 2015	Haleakala	Pan-STARRS 1	·	2.5 km	MPC · JPL
745000	2010 JG_{211}	—	February 28, 2014	Haleakala	Pan-STARRS 1	·	1.0 km	MPC · JPL

back to top
