= Meanings of minor-planet names: 216001–217000 =

As minor planet discoveries are confirmed, they are given a permanent number by the IAU's Minor Planet Center (MPC), and the discoverers can then submit names for them, following the IAU's naming conventions. The list below concerns those minor planets in the specified number-range that have received names, and explains the meanings of those names.

Official naming citations of newly named small Solar System bodies are approved and published in a bulletin by IAU's Working Group for Small Bodies Nomenclature (WGSBN). Before May 2021, citations were published in MPC's Minor Planet Circulars for many decades. Recent citations can also be found on the JPL Small-Body Database (SBDB). Until his death in 2016, German astronomer Lutz D. Schmadel compiled these citations into the Dictionary of Minor Planet Names (DMP) and regularly updated the collection.

Based on Paul Herget's The Names of the Minor Planets, Schmadel also researched the unclear origin of numerous asteroids, most of which had been named prior to World War II. This article incorporates text from this source, which is in the public domain: SBDB New namings may only be added to this list below after official publication as the preannouncement of names is condemned. The WGSBN publishes a comprehensive guideline for the naming rules of non-cometary small Solar System bodies.

== 216001–216100 ==
Named minor planet	Provisional	This minor planet was named for...	Ref · Catalog
216023 DaBoll	2005 VH	Homer F. DaBoll, American amateur astronomer.	IAU · 216023

== 216101–216200 ==
back to top

Named minor planet	Provisional	This minor planet was named for...	Ref · Catalog
216164 Simonkrughoff	2006 SM_{377}	Karl Simon Krughoff (1976–2023), an American astronomer.	IAU · 216164
216194 Újvárosy	2006 UA_{4}	Antal Újvárosy (b. 1954), a Hungarian environmental specialist, teacher and amateur astronomer.	IAU · 216194

== 216201–216300 ==
back to top

Named minor planet	Provisional	This minor planet was named for...	Ref · Catalog
216241 Renzopiano	2006 VF_{14}	Renzo Piano (born 1937), an Italian architect and engineer, who won the Pritzker Architecture Prize in 1998.	JPL · 216241
216261 Mapihsia	2006 WJ_{15}	Pi Hsia Ma (born 1951), the mother of co-discoverer Man-Ti Chang	JPL · 216261
216295 Menorca	2007 LX_{14}	Menorca is the most eastern and northern island of the Balearic Islands (Spain). It was declared a Biosphere Reserve in 1993 by UNESCO, and contains important megalithic monuments (navetas, talayots and taulas).	JPL · 216295

== 216301–216400 ==
back to top

Named minor planet	Provisional	This minor planet was named for...	Ref · Catalog
216319 Sanxia	2007 TY_{286}	China Three Gorges University (Sānxiá Dàxué) is a university with prominent hydraulic and electrical disciplines, located in Yichang City, Hubei Province, P. R. China.	IAU · 216319
216331 Panjunhua	2007 VG_{125}	Pan Junhua (born 1930), an academician of the Chinese Academy of Engineering, is the founder of both optic test equipment and optics manufacturing technology, and a pioneer of aspherical optics application in China.	JPL · 216331
216343 Wenchang	2007 WJ_{56}	Wenchang Shi, historically known as Zibei County, a Chinese city in Hainan Dao.	JPL · 216343
216345 Savigliano	2007 XC_{11}	Savigliano, an important agricultural and industrial center in Piedmont.	JPL · 216345
216368 Hypnomys	2008 AS_{101}	Hypnomys, an extinct genus of giant rodents that existed in the Balearic Islands until ca. 2000 BC	IAU · 216368
216390 Binnig	2008 CK_{177}	Gerd Binnig (born 1947), German physicist and Nobel laureate	JPL · 216390

== 216401–216500 ==
back to top

Named minor planet	Provisional	This minor planet was named for...	Ref · Catalog
216428 Mauricio	2008 YN_{8}	Mauricio Muler, the name of both a grandfather (1904–1987) and a son (born 1999) of co-discoverer Gustavo Muler	JPL · 216428
216433 Milianleo	2009 DM_{3}	Milian Leo Schwab (born 2004), son of German discoverer Erwin Schwab	JPL · 216433
216439 Lyubertsy	2009 EV_{3}	Lyubertsy, a major industrial and scenic center in the Moscow region.	JPL · 216439
216446 Nanshida	2009 FA_{45}	Nanshida, the Chinese abbreviation for the Nanjing Normal University, dates back to 1902 with the establishment of Sanjiang Normal College.	IAU · 216446
216451 Irsha	2009 HP_{12}	Irsha, a river in Ukraine	JPL · 216451
216462 Polyphontes	5397 T-2	Polyphontes, a Greek hero, son of Autophonos, was one of the leaders of an ambush against Tydeus near Thebes.	JPL · 216462

== 216501–216600 ==
back to top

Named minor planet	Provisional	This minor planet was named for...	Ref · Catalog
216591 Coetzee	2002 OQ_{7}	J. M. Coetzee (born 1940), a South African author and academic, now living in Australia.	JPL · 216591

== 216601–216700 ==
back to top

Named minor planet	Provisional	This minor planet was named for...	Ref · Catalog
216624 Kaufer	2002 XW_{37}	Andreas Kaufer (born 1968), a German astronomer	JPL · 216624

== 216701–216800 ==
back to top

Named minor planet	Provisional	This minor planet was named for...	Ref · Catalog
216752 Kirbyrunyon	2005 PR_{23}	Kirby D. Runyon (b. 1985), an American planetary scientist.	IAU · 216752
216757 Vasari	2005 RT_{32}	Giorgio Vasari (1511–1574) was an Italian architect and art historian. He realized the palace of the Caravan in Pisa and the Florentine complex of the Uffizi.	JPL · 216757
216780 Lilianne	2006 QP_{57}	Lilianne Alice Osmonson (born 2018) is the great-granddaughter of astronomer James Whitney Young, who discovered this minor planet.	JPL · 216780

== 216801–216900 ==
back to top

Named minor planet	Provisional	This minor planet was named for...	Ref · Catalog
216808 Tolmárgyula	2006 TG_{11}	Gyula Tolmár (1909–1987), a Hungarian astronomer and university lecturer.	IAU · 216808
216888 Sankovich	2008 VS_{3}	Anatoly Sankovich (born 1960), an amateur astronomer and telescope maker.	JPL · 216888
216893 Navina	2009 DP_{111}	Navina Lamminger (born 1978) is a German social scientist and author. She graduated in Tibetology at LMU Munich in 2013. She now works as a dramaturge for top cabaret artists.	IAU · 216893
216897 Golubev	2009 HJ_{58}	Golubev Vladimir Aleksandrovich (born 1940), on the astronomy faculty at Vitebsk State University, is a well-known astronomy popularizer and publicist in Belarus.	JPL · 216897

== 216901–217000 ==
back to top

Named minor planet	Provisional	This minor planet was named for...	Ref · Catalog
216910 Vnukov	2009 JM_{4}	Viktor Milentinovich Vnukov (born 1950), a pilot and engineer	JPL · 216910

back to top

Preceded by 215,001–216,000	Meanings of minor-planet names List of minor planets: 216,001–217,000	Succeeded by 217,001–218,000
