= List of minor planets: 216001–217000 =

The following is a partial list of minor planets, running from minor-planet number 216001 through 217000, inclusive. The primary data for this and other partial lists is based on JPL's "Small-Body Orbital Elements" and data available from the Minor Planet Center. Critical list information is also provided by the MPC, unless otherwise specified from Lowell Observatory. A detailed description of the table's columns and additional sources are given on the main page including a complete list of every page in this series, and a statistical break-up on the dynamical classification of minor planets.

Also see the summary list of all named bodies in numerical and alphabetical order, and the corresponding naming citations for the number range of this particular list. New namings may only be added to this list after official publication, as the preannouncement of names is condemned by the Working Group for Small Bodies Nomenclature of the International Astronomical Union.

Near-Earth obj.	MBA (inner)	MBA (outer)	Centaur
Mars-crosser	MBA (middle)	Jupiter trojan	Trans-Neptunian obj.
Unclassified

== 216001–216100 ==
Designation			Discovery			Properties		Ref
Permanent	Provisional	Named after	Date	Site	Discoverer(s)	Category	Diam.	Ref
216001	2005 SZ_{286}	—	September 26, 2005	Apache Point	A. C. Becker	·	3.2 km	MPC · JPL
216002	2005 TL_{7}	—	October 1, 2005	Catalina	CSS	·	7.2 km	MPC · JPL
216003	2005 TF_{76}	—	October 5, 2005	Catalina	CSS	·	4.1 km	MPC · JPL
216004	2005 TK_{103}	—	October 8, 2005	Bergisch Gladbach	W. Bickel	·	2.4 km	MPC · JPL
216005	2005 TU_{130}	—	October 7, 2005	Kitt Peak	Spacewatch	CYB	4.9 km	MPC · JPL
216006	2005 TL_{160}	—	October 9, 2005	Kitt Peak	Spacewatch	·	3.3 km	MPC · JPL
216007	2005 TX_{160}	—	October 9, 2005	Kitt Peak	Spacewatch	·	2.7 km	MPC · JPL
216008	2005 TS_{180}	—	October 1, 2005	Anderson Mesa	LONEOS	·	4.7 km	MPC · JPL
216009	2005 UD_{34}	—	October 24, 2005	Kitt Peak	Spacewatch	THM	2.7 km	MPC · JPL
216010	2005 UY_{65}	—	October 22, 2005	Palomar	NEAT	·	2.9 km	MPC · JPL
216011	2005 US_{66}	—	October 22, 2005	Palomar	NEAT	·	4.6 km	MPC · JPL
216012	2005 UX_{80}	—	October 25, 2005	Catalina	CSS	T_{j} (2.97) · EUP	7.5 km	MPC · JPL
216013	2005 UL_{95}	—	October 22, 2005	Kitt Peak	Spacewatch	KOR	2.6 km	MPC · JPL
216014	2005 UZ_{141}	—	October 25, 2005	Catalina	CSS	·	6.0 km	MPC · JPL
216015	2005 UB_{162}	—	October 27, 2005	Socorro	LINEAR	·	2.0 km	MPC · JPL
216016	2005 UD_{213}	—	October 27, 2005	Mount Lemmon	Mount Lemmon Survey	·	1.7 km	MPC · JPL
216017	2005 UZ_{253}	—	October 28, 2005	Kitt Peak	Spacewatch	·	3.3 km	MPC · JPL
216018	2005 UJ_{349}	—	October 25, 2005	Catalina	CSS	·	3.5 km	MPC · JPL
216019	2005 UU_{383}	—	October 27, 2005	Catalina	CSS	·	4.3 km	MPC · JPL
216020	2005 UD_{510}	—	October 24, 2005	Kitt Peak	Spacewatch	·	1.8 km	MPC · JPL
216021	2005 UF_{510}	—	October 24, 2005	Kitt Peak	Spacewatch	TIR	4.4 km	MPC · JPL
216022	2005 UY_{517}	—	October 25, 2005	Apache Point	A. C. Becker	·	4.2 km	MPC · JPL
216023 DaBoll	2005 VH	DaBoll	November 2, 2005	Desert Moon	Stevens, B. L.	·	3.8 km	MPC · JPL
216024	2005 VX_{10}	—	November 2, 2005	Mount Lemmon	Mount Lemmon Survey	·	3.5 km	MPC · JPL
216025	2005 VX_{56}	—	November 4, 2005	Mount Lemmon	Mount Lemmon Survey	NAE	3.9 km	MPC · JPL
216026	2005 VJ_{87}	—	November 6, 2005	Kitt Peak	Spacewatch	·	3.2 km	MPC · JPL
216027	2005 VS_{115}	—	November 11, 2005	Kitt Peak	Spacewatch	·	2.7 km	MPC · JPL
216028	2005 WB_{59}	—	November 28, 2005	Junk Bond	D. Healy	THM	3.0 km	MPC · JPL
216029	2005 XW_{64}	—	December 7, 2005	Socorro	LINEAR	(5)	2.3 km	MPC · JPL
216030	2005 XR_{79}	—	December 4, 2005	Kitt Peak	Spacewatch	·	5.3 km	MPC · JPL
216031	2005 YA_{128}	—	December 28, 2005	Mount Lemmon	Mount Lemmon Survey	·	940 m	MPC · JPL
216032	2005 YY_{194}	—	December 31, 2005	Kitt Peak	Spacewatch	V	1.1 km	MPC · JPL
216033	2006 AW_{67}	—	January 4, 2006	Mount Lemmon	Mount Lemmon Survey	NYS	1.8 km	MPC · JPL
216034	2006 BN_{143}	—	January 28, 2006	Mount Lemmon	Mount Lemmon Survey	L5	15 km	MPC · JPL
216035	2006 BA_{168}	—	January 26, 2006	Mount Lemmon	Mount Lemmon Survey	·	910 m	MPC · JPL
216036	2006 DY_{9}	—	February 21, 2006	Catalina	CSS	fast	2.1 km	MPC · JPL
216037	2006 DU_{12}	—	February 21, 2006	Mount Lemmon	Mount Lemmon Survey	·	3.3 km	MPC · JPL
216038	2006 DH_{59}	—	February 24, 2006	Mount Lemmon	Mount Lemmon Survey	·	760 m	MPC · JPL
216039	2006 EG_{16}	—	March 2, 2006	Kitt Peak	Spacewatch	·	2.5 km	MPC · JPL
216040	2006 HE_{1}	—	April 18, 2006	Anderson Mesa	LONEOS	EOS	3.1 km	MPC · JPL
216041	2006 HO_{9}	—	April 19, 2006	Kitt Peak	Spacewatch	·	980 m	MPC · JPL
216042	2006 JC_{19}	—	May 2, 2006	Mount Lemmon	Mount Lemmon Survey	·	830 m	MPC · JPL
216043	2006 JP_{33}	—	May 4, 2006	Mount Lemmon	Mount Lemmon Survey	THM	2.9 km	MPC · JPL
216044	2006 JV_{35}	—	May 4, 2006	Kitt Peak	Spacewatch	·	750 m	MPC · JPL
216045	2006 KZ_{55}	—	May 21, 2006	Kitt Peak	Spacewatch	·	880 m	MPC · JPL
216046	2006 LK_{1}	—	June 3, 2006	Mount Lemmon	Mount Lemmon Survey	·	810 m	MPC · JPL
216047	2006 OJ_{2}	—	July 18, 2006	Mount Lemmon	Mount Lemmon Survey	·	1.9 km	MPC · JPL
216048	2006 OQ_{10}	—	July 26, 2006	Cordell-Lorenz	Cordell-Lorenz	·	900 m	MPC · JPL
216049	2006 OS_{13}	—	July 25, 2006	Palomar	NEAT	·	860 m	MPC · JPL
216050	2006 OA_{15}	—	July 26, 2006	Reedy Creek	J. Broughton	·	1.1 km	MPC · JPL
216051	2006 OR_{17}	—	July 18, 2006	Siding Spring	SSS	·	2.6 km	MPC · JPL
216052	2006 OL_{20}	—	July 31, 2006	Siding Spring	SSS	·	1.1 km	MPC · JPL
216053	2006 PD_{10}	—	August 13, 2006	Palomar	NEAT	·	1.9 km	MPC · JPL
216054	2006 PB_{13}	—	August 14, 2006	Siding Spring	SSS	·	1.2 km	MPC · JPL
216055	2006 PB_{20}	—	August 14, 2006	Siding Spring	SSS	V	900 m	MPC · JPL
216056	2006 PM_{21}	—	August 15, 2006	Palomar	NEAT	·	930 m	MPC · JPL
216057	2006 PU_{26}	—	August 15, 2006	Palomar	NEAT	·	1.0 km	MPC · JPL
216058	2006 PT_{35}	—	August 12, 2006	Palomar	NEAT	·	1.1 km	MPC · JPL
216059	2006 PR_{41}	—	August 14, 2006	Palomar	NEAT	·	1.9 km	MPC · JPL
216060	2006 QN_{2}	—	August 17, 2006	Palomar	NEAT	·	1.8 km	MPC · JPL
216061	2006 QU_{6}	—	August 17, 2006	Palomar	NEAT	·	3.1 km	MPC · JPL
216062	2006 QJ_{7}	—	August 18, 2006	Socorro	LINEAR	PHO	1.2 km	MPC · JPL
216063	2006 QZ_{8}	—	August 19, 2006	Kitt Peak	Spacewatch	·	1.4 km	MPC · JPL
216064	2006 QP_{10}	—	August 20, 2006	Kanab	Sheridan, E. E.	V	880 m	MPC · JPL
216065	2006 QM_{13}	—	August 16, 2006	Lulin	Lin, C.-S., Q. Ye	·	1.6 km	MPC · JPL
216066	2006 QO_{13}	—	August 16, 2006	Siding Spring	SSS	V	1.0 km	MPC · JPL
216067	2006 QP_{13}	—	August 16, 2006	Siding Spring	SSS	V	900 m	MPC · JPL
216068	2006 QO_{14}	—	August 17, 2006	Palomar	NEAT	·	1.9 km	MPC · JPL
216069	2006 QZ_{14}	—	August 17, 2006	Palomar	NEAT	CYB	4.2 km	MPC · JPL
216070	2006 QO_{20}	—	August 18, 2006	Anderson Mesa	LONEOS	·	790 m	MPC · JPL
216071	2006 QE_{25}	—	August 18, 2006	Anderson Mesa	LONEOS	·	1.1 km	MPC · JPL
216072	2006 QL_{29}	—	August 16, 2006	Siding Spring	SSS	NYS	1.5 km	MPC · JPL
216073	2006 QD_{33}	—	August 23, 2006	Socorro	LINEAR	·	1.6 km	MPC · JPL
216074	2006 QE_{36}	—	August 21, 2006	Pla D'Arguines	R. Ferrando	·	1.7 km	MPC · JPL
216075	2006 QO_{44}	—	August 19, 2006	Anderson Mesa	LONEOS	·	1.6 km	MPC · JPL
216076	2006 QV_{46}	—	August 20, 2006	Palomar	NEAT	·	1.4 km	MPC · JPL
216077	2006 QG_{53}	—	August 23, 2006	Palomar	NEAT	·	1.5 km	MPC · JPL
216078	2006 QE_{54}	—	August 16, 2006	Siding Spring	SSS	·	1.1 km	MPC · JPL
216079	2006 QY_{57}	—	August 27, 2006	Kanab	Sheridan, E. E.	·	2.8 km	MPC · JPL
216080	2006 QK_{60}	—	August 20, 2006	Palomar	NEAT	·	1.2 km	MPC · JPL
216081	2006 QM_{78}	—	August 22, 2006	Palomar	NEAT	·	890 m	MPC · JPL
216082	2006 QS_{78}	—	August 23, 2006	Socorro	LINEAR	·	1.8 km	MPC · JPL
216083	2006 QZ_{85}	—	August 27, 2006	Kitt Peak	Spacewatch	·	4.0 km	MPC · JPL
216084	2006 QA_{96}	—	August 16, 2006	Palomar	NEAT	·	4.1 km	MPC · JPL
216085	2006 QT_{107}	—	August 28, 2006	Catalina	CSS	·	2.0 km	MPC · JPL
216086	2006 QN_{130}	—	August 20, 2006	Palomar	NEAT	·	1.1 km	MPC · JPL
216087	2006 QE_{135}	—	August 27, 2006	Anderson Mesa	LONEOS	·	810 m	MPC · JPL
216088	2006 QL_{135}	—	August 27, 2006	Anderson Mesa	LONEOS	·	1.1 km	MPC · JPL
216089	2006 QH_{136}	—	August 29, 2006	Anderson Mesa	LONEOS	·	2.6 km	MPC · JPL
216090	2006 QK_{136}	—	August 29, 2006	Anderson Mesa	LONEOS	·	2.4 km	MPC · JPL
216091	2006 QZ_{159}	—	August 19, 2006	Kitt Peak	Spacewatch	(5)	1.6 km	MPC · JPL
216092	2006 QU_{161}	—	August 19, 2006	Kitt Peak	Spacewatch	·	1.2 km	MPC · JPL
216093	2006 QZ_{166}	—	August 30, 2006	Socorro	LINEAR	·	1.5 km	MPC · JPL
216094	2006 QK_{168}	—	August 30, 2006	Anderson Mesa	LONEOS	·	1.9 km	MPC · JPL
216095	2006 RW_{5}	—	September 14, 2006	Kitt Peak	Spacewatch	·	3.0 km	MPC · JPL
216096	2006 RT_{13}	—	September 14, 2006	Kitt Peak	Spacewatch	JUN	1.4 km	MPC · JPL
216097	2006 RU_{16}	—	September 14, 2006	Catalina	CSS	·	2.2 km	MPC · JPL
216098	2006 RT_{18}	—	September 14, 2006	Palomar	NEAT	JUN	3.0 km	MPC · JPL
216099	2006 RS_{20}	—	September 15, 2006	Kitt Peak	Spacewatch	·	830 m	MPC · JPL
216100	2006 RA_{23}	—	September 12, 2006	Socorro	LINEAR	·	1.5 km	MPC · JPL

== 216101–216200 ==
back to top

Designation			Discovery			Properties		Ref
Permanent	Provisional	Named after	Date	Site	Discoverer(s)	Category	Diam.	Ref
216101	2006 RJ_{23}	—	September 12, 2006	Catalina	CSS	(2076)	1.3 km	MPC · JPL
216102	2006 RS_{24}	—	September 14, 2006	Kitt Peak	Spacewatch	·	1.1 km	MPC · JPL
216103	2006 RE_{34}	—	September 12, 2006	Catalina	CSS	NYS	2.1 km	MPC · JPL
216104	2006 RA_{44}	—	September 14, 2006	Kitt Peak	Spacewatch	·	1.1 km	MPC · JPL
216105	2006 RX_{44}	—	September 14, 2006	Kitt Peak	Spacewatch	·	3.9 km	MPC · JPL
216106	2006 RN_{46}	—	September 14, 2006	Kitt Peak	Spacewatch	·	2.2 km	MPC · JPL
216107	2006 RZ_{47}	—	September 14, 2006	Catalina	CSS	·	2.5 km	MPC · JPL
216108	2006 RL_{69}	—	September 15, 2006	Kitt Peak	Spacewatch	·	940 m	MPC · JPL
216109	2006 RJ_{75}	—	September 15, 2006	Kitt Peak	Spacewatch	NYS	1.4 km	MPC · JPL
216110	2006 RA_{85}	—	September 15, 2006	Kitt Peak	Spacewatch	·	1.6 km	MPC · JPL
216111	2006 RU_{87}	—	September 15, 2006	Kitt Peak	Spacewatch	·	2.0 km	MPC · JPL
216112	2006 RP_{90}	—	September 15, 2006	Kitt Peak	Spacewatch	HOF	3.3 km	MPC · JPL
216113	2006 RB_{91}	—	September 15, 2006	Kitt Peak	Spacewatch	·	2.0 km	MPC · JPL
216114	2006 SF_{14}	—	September 17, 2006	Catalina	CSS	·	1.3 km	MPC · JPL
216115	2006 SU_{19}	—	September 18, 2006	Kitt Peak	Spacewatch	APO · PHA	580 m	MPC · JPL
216116	2006 SE_{28}	—	September 17, 2006	Kitt Peak	Spacewatch	·	3.2 km	MPC · JPL
216117	2006 SJ_{36}	—	September 17, 2006	Anderson Mesa	LONEOS	V	870 m	MPC · JPL
216118	2006 SV_{38}	—	September 18, 2006	Kitt Peak	Spacewatch	·	2.4 km	MPC · JPL
216119	2006 SM_{42}	—	September 18, 2006	Anderson Mesa	LONEOS	·	2.3 km	MPC · JPL
216120	2006 SP_{46}	—	September 19, 2006	Catalina	CSS	·	1.2 km	MPC · JPL
216121	2006 ST_{56}	—	September 20, 2006	Catalina	CSS	·	1.3 km	MPC · JPL
216122	2006 SJ_{62}	—	September 18, 2006	Anderson Mesa	LONEOS	·	1.5 km	MPC · JPL
216123	2006 SN_{68}	—	September 19, 2006	Kitt Peak	Spacewatch	AST	3.9 km	MPC · JPL
216124	2006 SW_{69}	—	September 19, 2006	Kitt Peak	Spacewatch	·	2.4 km	MPC · JPL
216125	2006 SN_{71}	—	September 19, 2006	Kitt Peak	Spacewatch	·	1.2 km	MPC · JPL
216126	2006 SD_{89}	—	September 18, 2006	Kitt Peak	Spacewatch	THM	2.8 km	MPC · JPL
216127	2006 SA_{92}	—	September 18, 2006	Kitt Peak	Spacewatch	·	2.4 km	MPC · JPL
216128	2006 SZ_{92}	—	September 18, 2006	Kitt Peak	Spacewatch	MAS	1.1 km	MPC · JPL
216129	2006 SX_{93}	—	September 18, 2006	Kitt Peak	Spacewatch	MAS	940 m	MPC · JPL
216130	2006 SN_{95}	—	September 18, 2006	Kitt Peak	Spacewatch	KOR	1.9 km	MPC · JPL
216131	2006 SE_{97}	—	September 18, 2006	Kitt Peak	Spacewatch	·	2.0 km	MPC · JPL
216132	2006 SH_{102}	—	September 19, 2006	Kitt Peak	Spacewatch	·	1.8 km	MPC · JPL
216133	2006 SH_{105}	—	September 19, 2006	Kitt Peak	Spacewatch	·	2.1 km	MPC · JPL
216134	2006 SE_{108}	—	September 19, 2006	Catalina	CSS	·	2.1 km	MPC · JPL
216135	2006 SP_{108}	—	September 19, 2006	Kitt Peak	Spacewatch	·	1.8 km	MPC · JPL
216136	2006 SZ_{108}	—	September 19, 2006	Kitt Peak	Spacewatch	·	2.7 km	MPC · JPL
216137	2006 SO_{110}	—	September 20, 2006	Catalina	CSS	BRA	2.4 km	MPC · JPL
216138	2006 SJ_{112}	—	September 23, 2006	Kitt Peak	Spacewatch	·	1.3 km	MPC · JPL
216139	2006 SL_{119}	—	September 18, 2006	Catalina	CSS	·	970 m	MPC · JPL
216140	2006 ST_{119}	—	September 18, 2006	Catalina	CSS	·	2.0 km	MPC · JPL
216141	2006 SQ_{142}	—	September 19, 2006	Catalina	CSS	MAS	820 m	MPC · JPL
216142	2006 SQ_{147}	—	September 19, 2006	Kitt Peak	Spacewatch	·	900 m	MPC · JPL
216143	2006 SY_{172}	—	September 25, 2006	Kitt Peak	Spacewatch	·	2.1 km	MPC · JPL
216144	2006 SE_{219}	—	September 30, 2006	Catalina	CSS	·	2.5 km	MPC · JPL
216145	2006 SY_{261}	—	September 26, 2006	Mount Lemmon	Mount Lemmon Survey	KOR	1.5 km	MPC · JPL
216146	2006 SU_{262}	—	September 26, 2006	Mount Lemmon	Mount Lemmon Survey	(17392)	1.7 km	MPC · JPL
216147	2006 SE_{275}	—	September 27, 2006	Kitt Peak	Spacewatch	·	3.5 km	MPC · JPL
216148	2006 SO_{280}	—	September 29, 2006	Anderson Mesa	LONEOS	·	1.9 km	MPC · JPL
216149	2006 SW_{280}	—	September 29, 2006	Anderson Mesa	LONEOS	·	2.1 km	MPC · JPL
216150	2006 SL_{285}	—	September 24, 2006	Kitt Peak	Spacewatch	·	4.0 km	MPC · JPL
216151	2006 SV_{288}	—	September 26, 2006	Catalina	CSS	MAR	1.4 km	MPC · JPL
216152	2006 SU_{290}	—	September 25, 2006	Kitt Peak	Spacewatch	·	3.1 km	MPC · JPL
216153	2006 SD_{300}	—	September 26, 2006	Catalina	CSS	·	4.1 km	MPC · JPL
216154	2006 SS_{318}	—	September 27, 2006	Kitt Peak	Spacewatch	MAR	1.5 km	MPC · JPL
216155	2006 SY_{318}	—	September 27, 2006	Kitt Peak	Spacewatch	AGN	1.5 km	MPC · JPL
216156	2006 SF_{323}	—	September 27, 2006	Kitt Peak	Spacewatch	·	1 km	MPC · JPL
216157	2006 SM_{327}	—	September 27, 2006	Kitt Peak	Spacewatch	KOR	1.4 km	MPC · JPL
216158	2006 SD_{328}	—	September 27, 2006	Kitt Peak	Spacewatch	·	1.5 km	MPC · JPL
216159	2006 SA_{333}	—	September 28, 2006	Kitt Peak	Spacewatch	·	1.8 km	MPC · JPL
216160	2006 SK_{334}	—	September 28, 2006	Kitt Peak	Spacewatch	·	2.8 km	MPC · JPL
216161	2006 SD_{354}	—	September 30, 2006	Catalina	CSS	·	1.6 km	MPC · JPL
216162	2006 SL_{360}	—	September 30, 2006	Mount Lemmon	Mount Lemmon Survey	·	2.4 km	MPC · JPL
216163	2006 SF_{361}	—	September 30, 2006	Mount Lemmon	Mount Lemmon Survey	EOS	2.4 km	MPC · JPL
216164 Simonkrughoff	2006 SM_{377}	Simonkrughoff	September 17, 2006	Apache Point	A. C. Becker	·	1.6 km	MPC · JPL
216165	2006 SE_{383}	—	September 29, 2006	Apache Point	A. C. Becker	AEO	1.3 km	MPC · JPL
216166	2006 SM_{385}	—	September 29, 2006	Apache Point	A. C. Becker	·	3.8 km	MPC · JPL
216167	2006 SD_{389}	—	September 30, 2006	Apache Point	A. C. Becker	·	3.0 km	MPC · JPL
216168	2006 SG_{391}	—	September 18, 2006	Kitt Peak	Spacewatch	·	2.0 km	MPC · JPL
216169	2006 SU_{392}	—	September 26, 2006	Mount Lemmon	Mount Lemmon Survey	·	1.6 km	MPC · JPL
216170	2006 SF_{394}	—	September 30, 2006	Mount Lemmon	Mount Lemmon Survey	·	4.0 km	MPC · JPL
216171	2006 SS_{404}	—	September 30, 2006	Mount Lemmon	Mount Lemmon Survey	·	1.5 km	MPC · JPL
216172	2006 ST_{408}	—	September 19, 2006	Catalina	CSS	BRA	2.1 km	MPC · JPL
216173	2006 TK_{6}	—	October 3, 2006	Mount Lemmon	Mount Lemmon Survey	·	2.5 km	MPC · JPL
216174	2006 TA_{21}	—	October 11, 2006	Kitt Peak	Spacewatch	·	5.7 km	MPC · JPL
216175	2006 TE_{21}	—	October 11, 2006	Kitt Peak	Spacewatch	ADE	4.0 km	MPC · JPL
216176	2006 TP_{21}	—	October 11, 2006	Kitt Peak	Spacewatch	PAD	2.3 km	MPC · JPL
216177	2006 TE_{23}	—	October 11, 2006	Kitt Peak	Spacewatch	(29841)	1.9 km	MPC · JPL
216178	2006 TG_{23}	—	October 11, 2006	Kitt Peak	Spacewatch	·	1.7 km	MPC · JPL
216179	2006 TC_{24}	—	October 11, 2006	Kitt Peak	Spacewatch	·	2.1 km	MPC · JPL
216180	2006 TF_{31}	—	October 12, 2006	Kitt Peak	Spacewatch	KOR	1.8 km	MPC · JPL
216181	2006 TV_{35}	—	October 12, 2006	Kitt Peak	Spacewatch	·	2.2 km	MPC · JPL
216182	2006 TD_{45}	—	October 12, 2006	Kitt Peak	Spacewatch	·	2.5 km	MPC · JPL
216183	2006 TP_{53}	—	October 12, 2006	Kitt Peak	Spacewatch	·	2.9 km	MPC · JPL
216184	2006 TT_{60}	—	October 14, 2006	Bergisch Gladbach	W. Bickel	·	2.5 km	MPC · JPL
216185	2006 TT_{64}	—	October 11, 2006	Kitt Peak	Spacewatch	·	850 m	MPC · JPL
216186	2006 TU_{73}	—	October 11, 2006	Kitt Peak	Spacewatch	·	2.1 km	MPC · JPL
216187	2006 TO_{74}	—	October 11, 2006	Palomar	NEAT	·	4.0 km	MPC · JPL
216188	2006 TC_{79}	—	October 12, 2006	Kitt Peak	Spacewatch	·	2.3 km	MPC · JPL
216189	2006 TK_{102}	—	October 15, 2006	Kitt Peak	Spacewatch	·	1.6 km	MPC · JPL
216190	2006 TD_{109}	—	October 3, 2006	Mount Lemmon	Mount Lemmon Survey	·	2.4 km	MPC · JPL
216191	2006 TS_{109}	—	October 11, 2006	Palomar	NEAT	·	2.2 km	MPC · JPL
216192	2006 TT_{112}	—	October 1, 2006	Apache Point	A. C. Becker	·	2.9 km	MPC · JPL
216193	2006 TL_{117}	—	October 3, 2006	Apache Point	A. C. Becker	EOS	4.8 km	MPC · JPL
216194 Újvárosy	2006 UA_{4}	Újvárosy	October 17, 2006	Piszkéstető	K. Sárneczky	·	2.1 km	MPC · JPL
216195	2006 UD_{5}	—	October 16, 2006	Kitt Peak	Spacewatch	·	4.6 km	MPC · JPL
216196	2006 UW_{5}	—	October 16, 2006	Kitt Peak	Spacewatch	·	2.9 km	MPC · JPL
216197	2006 UA_{7}	—	October 16, 2006	Catalina	CSS	MAR	1.7 km	MPC · JPL
216198	2006 UH_{7}	—	October 16, 2006	Catalina	CSS	·	2.4 km	MPC · JPL
216199	2006 UR_{7}	—	October 16, 2006	Catalina	CSS	·	1.7 km	MPC · JPL
216200	2006 UQ_{11}	—	October 17, 2006	Mount Lemmon	Mount Lemmon Survey	·	4.8 km	MPC · JPL

== 216201–216300 ==
back to top

Designation			Discovery			Properties		Ref
Permanent	Provisional	Named after	Date	Site	Discoverer(s)	Category	Diam.	Ref
216201	2006 UH_{13}	—	October 17, 2006	Mount Lemmon	Mount Lemmon Survey	·	2.3 km	MPC · JPL
216202	2006 UJ_{13}	—	October 17, 2006	Mount Lemmon	Mount Lemmon Survey	·	2.2 km	MPC · JPL
216203	2006 UQ_{14}	—	October 17, 2006	Mount Lemmon	Mount Lemmon Survey	(5)	2.9 km	MPC · JPL
216204	2006 UD_{20}	—	October 16, 2006	Kitt Peak	Spacewatch	AGN	1.4 km	MPC · JPL
216205	2006 UQ_{27}	—	October 16, 2006	Kitt Peak	Spacewatch	·	1.8 km	MPC · JPL
216206	2006 UZ_{44}	—	October 16, 2006	Kitt Peak	Spacewatch	·	2.8 km	MPC · JPL
216207	2006 UN_{45}	—	October 16, 2006	Kitt Peak	Spacewatch	EOS	2.2 km	MPC · JPL
216208	2006 UC_{58}	—	October 18, 2006	Kitt Peak	Spacewatch	(5)	1.5 km	MPC · JPL
216209	2006 UA_{61}	—	October 19, 2006	Catalina	CSS	·	4.8 km	MPC · JPL
216210	2006 UO_{65}	—	October 16, 2006	Mount Lemmon	Mount Lemmon Survey	·	2.0 km	MPC · JPL
216211	2006 UV_{68}	—	October 16, 2006	Catalina	CSS	·	3.1 km	MPC · JPL
216212	2006 UC_{73}	—	October 17, 2006	Kitt Peak	Spacewatch	SYL · CYB	6.5 km	MPC · JPL
216213	2006 UT_{79}	—	October 17, 2006	Kitt Peak	Spacewatch	·	2.1 km	MPC · JPL
216214	2006 UE_{91}	—	October 17, 2006	Kitt Peak	Spacewatch	EOS	3.2 km	MPC · JPL
216215	2006 UG_{92}	—	October 18, 2006	Kitt Peak	Spacewatch	·	1.5 km	MPC · JPL
216216	2006 UR_{93}	—	October 18, 2006	Kitt Peak	Spacewatch	·	2.4 km	MPC · JPL
216217	2006 UD_{94}	—	October 18, 2006	Kitt Peak	Spacewatch	(5)	2.2 km	MPC · JPL
216218	2006 US_{98}	—	October 18, 2006	Kitt Peak	Spacewatch	·	2.6 km	MPC · JPL
216219	2006 UU_{98}	—	October 18, 2006	Kitt Peak	Spacewatch	·	3.2 km	MPC · JPL
216220	2006 UD_{99}	—	October 18, 2006	Kitt Peak	Spacewatch	·	2.3 km	MPC · JPL
216221	2006 UZ_{103}	—	October 18, 2006	Kitt Peak	Spacewatch	·	1.5 km	MPC · JPL
216222	2006 UG_{108}	—	October 18, 2006	Kitt Peak	Spacewatch	·	3.6 km	MPC · JPL
216223	2006 UC_{132}	—	October 19, 2006	Mount Lemmon	Mount Lemmon Survey	WAT	2.5 km	MPC · JPL
216224	2006 UR_{143}	—	October 19, 2006	Kitt Peak	Spacewatch	·	1.5 km	MPC · JPL
216225	2006 UC_{155}	—	October 21, 2006	Catalina	CSS	·	1.9 km	MPC · JPL
216226	2006 UN_{162}	—	October 21, 2006	Mount Lemmon	Mount Lemmon Survey	AGN	1.5 km	MPC · JPL
216227	2006 UQ_{162}	—	October 21, 2006	Mount Lemmon	Mount Lemmon Survey	·	2.7 km	MPC · JPL
216228	2006 UM_{183}	—	October 17, 2006	Catalina	CSS	·	3.5 km	MPC · JPL
216229	2006 UQ_{215}	—	October 23, 2006	Kanab	Sheridan, E. E.	·	1.9 km	MPC · JPL
216230	2006 UG_{216}	—	October 29, 2006	Kitami	K. Endate	·	2.4 km	MPC · JPL
216231	2006 UM_{223}	—	October 19, 2006	Kitt Peak	Spacewatch	(12739)	2.2 km	MPC · JPL
216232	2006 UB_{226}	—	October 20, 2006	Kitt Peak	Spacewatch	·	2.5 km	MPC · JPL
216233	2006 UF_{241}	—	October 23, 2006	Mount Lemmon	Mount Lemmon Survey	(5)	1.9 km	MPC · JPL
216234	2006 UA_{244}	—	October 27, 2006	Mount Lemmon	Mount Lemmon Survey	KOR	1.7 km	MPC · JPL
216235	2006 UZ_{266}	—	October 27, 2006	Kitt Peak	Spacewatch	·	2.0 km	MPC · JPL
216236	2006 UV_{274}	—	October 28, 2006	Kitt Peak	Spacewatch	·	1.4 km	MPC · JPL
216237	2006 UZ_{286}	—	October 28, 2006	Kitt Peak	Spacewatch	·	3.5 km	MPC · JPL
216238	2006 UB_{287}	—	October 28, 2006	Kitt Peak	Spacewatch	EOS	2.6 km	MPC · JPL
216239	2006 UW_{328}	—	October 20, 2006	Kitt Peak	Spacewatch	·	2.6 km	MPC · JPL
216240	2006 VS_{7}	—	November 10, 2006	Kitt Peak	Spacewatch	EOS	2.5 km	MPC · JPL
216241 Renzopiano	2006 VF_{14}	Renzopiano	November 14, 2006	Vallemare Borbona	V. S. Casulli	EOS	2.8 km	MPC · JPL
216242	2006 VK_{14}	—	November 15, 2006	Wrightwood	J. W. Young	·	2.4 km	MPC · JPL
216243	2006 VP_{45}	—	November 13, 2006	Mount Lemmon	Mount Lemmon Survey	·	4.7 km	MPC · JPL
216244	2006 VW_{58}	—	November 11, 2006	Kitt Peak	Spacewatch	·	5.7 km	MPC · JPL
216245	2006 VX_{58}	—	November 11, 2006	Kitt Peak	Spacewatch	·	3.2 km	MPC · JPL
216246	2006 VH_{86}	—	November 14, 2006	Socorro	LINEAR	·	2.8 km	MPC · JPL
216247	2006 VX_{89}	—	November 14, 2006	Socorro	LINEAR	·	4.8 km	MPC · JPL
216248	2006 VZ_{90}	—	November 14, 2006	Mount Lemmon	Mount Lemmon Survey	·	1.9 km	MPC · JPL
216249	2006 VV_{99}	—	November 11, 2006	Kitt Peak	Spacewatch	VER	4.0 km	MPC · JPL
216250	2006 VY_{105}	—	November 13, 2006	Kitt Peak	Spacewatch	AGN	1.7 km	MPC · JPL
216251	2006 VR_{106}	—	November 13, 2006	Catalina	CSS	·	2.1 km	MPC · JPL
216252	2006 VS_{111}	—	November 13, 2006	Kitt Peak	Spacewatch	TEL	1.8 km	MPC · JPL
216253	2006 VW_{111}	—	November 13, 2006	Kitt Peak	Spacewatch	EOS	3.6 km	MPC · JPL
216254	2006 VE_{126}	—	November 15, 2006	Kitt Peak	Spacewatch	·	3.5 km	MPC · JPL
216255	2006 VJ_{146}	—	November 15, 2006	Catalina	CSS	·	2.9 km	MPC · JPL
216256	2006 VU_{147}	—	November 15, 2006	Kitt Peak	Spacewatch	·	1.9 km	MPC · JPL
216257	2006 VR_{154}	—	November 8, 2006	Palomar	NEAT	MAR	1.6 km	MPC · JPL
216258	2006 WH_{1}	—	November 18, 2006	La Sagra	OAM	APO · PHA	310 m	MPC · JPL
216259	2006 WY_{9}	—	November 16, 2006	Mount Lemmon	Mount Lemmon Survey	·	1.1 km	MPC · JPL
216260	2006 WG_{13}	—	November 16, 2006	Mount Lemmon	Mount Lemmon Survey	·	3.0 km	MPC · JPL
216261 Mapihsia	2006 WJ_{15}	Mapihsia	November 16, 2006	Lulin	Chang, M.-T., Q. Ye	fast	4.5 km	MPC · JPL
216262	2006 WR_{16}	—	November 17, 2006	Kitt Peak	Spacewatch	·	2.3 km	MPC · JPL
216263	2006 WL_{43}	—	November 16, 2006	Mount Lemmon	Mount Lemmon Survey	EOS	2.3 km	MPC · JPL
216264	2006 WU_{44}	—	November 16, 2006	Kitt Peak	Spacewatch	·	2.2 km	MPC · JPL
216265	2006 WD_{60}	—	November 17, 2006	Socorro	LINEAR	·	910 m	MPC · JPL
216266	2006 WL_{60}	—	November 17, 2006	Kitt Peak	Spacewatch	·	4.3 km	MPC · JPL
216267	2006 WU_{72}	—	November 18, 2006	Kitt Peak	Spacewatch	·	3.3 km	MPC · JPL
216268	2006 WY_{77}	—	November 18, 2006	Kitt Peak	Spacewatch	·	4.1 km	MPC · JPL
216269	2006 WP_{81}	—	November 18, 2006	Kitt Peak	Spacewatch	·	2.5 km	MPC · JPL
216270	2006 WQ_{99}	—	November 19, 2006	Kitt Peak	Spacewatch	·	1.6 km	MPC · JPL
216271	2006 WE_{101}	—	November 19, 2006	Socorro	LINEAR	·	3.0 km	MPC · JPL
216272	2006 WY_{110}	—	November 19, 2006	Kitt Peak	Spacewatch	EOS	2.8 km	MPC · JPL
216273	2006 WS_{127}	—	November 16, 2006	Mount Nyukasa	Japan Aerospace Exploration Agency	EOS	2.6 km	MPC · JPL
216274	2006 WV_{140}	—	November 20, 2006	Kitt Peak	Spacewatch	·	2.1 km	MPC · JPL
216275	2006 WV_{161}	—	November 23, 2006	Kitt Peak	Spacewatch	·	1.9 km	MPC · JPL
216276	2006 WO_{171}	—	November 23, 2006	Kitt Peak	Spacewatch	·	2.5 km	MPC · JPL
216277	2006 WE_{180}	—	November 24, 2006	Kitt Peak	Spacewatch	·	2.8 km	MPC · JPL
216278	2006 WS_{191}	—	November 27, 2006	Catalina	CSS	·	3.6 km	MPC · JPL
216279	2006 WM_{202}	—	November 25, 2006	Kitt Peak	Spacewatch	·	4.2 km	MPC · JPL
216280	2006 XM_{11}	—	December 10, 2006	Kitt Peak	Spacewatch	·	1.3 km	MPC · JPL
216281	2006 XD_{21}	—	December 11, 2006	Kitt Peak	Spacewatch	·	4.5 km	MPC · JPL
216282	2006 XP_{23}	—	December 12, 2006	Mount Lemmon	Mount Lemmon Survey	·	4.3 km	MPC · JPL
216283	2006 XF_{26}	—	December 12, 2006	Catalina	CSS	·	3.7 km	MPC · JPL
216284	2006 XD_{36}	—	December 11, 2006	Catalina	CSS	·	3.2 km	MPC · JPL
216285	2006 XR_{53}	—	December 15, 2006	Kitt Peak	Spacewatch	·	4.3 km	MPC · JPL
216286	2006 YF_{46}	—	December 21, 2006	Catalina	CSS	URS	5.4 km	MPC · JPL
216287	2007 AE	—	January 7, 2007	Eskridge	Farpoint	·	4.4 km	MPC · JPL
216288	2007 AG_{5}	—	January 8, 2007	Mount Lemmon	Mount Lemmon Survey	EOS	2.6 km	MPC · JPL
216289	2007 BG_{5}	—	January 17, 2007	Palomar	NEAT	HNS	2.0 km	MPC · JPL
216290	2007 EM_{132}	—	March 9, 2007	Mount Lemmon	Mount Lemmon Survey	·	1.3 km	MPC · JPL
216291	2007 EO_{149}	—	March 12, 2007	Mount Lemmon	Mount Lemmon Survey	L5	10 km	MPC · JPL
216292	2007 EM_{195}	—	March 15, 2007	Kitt Peak	Spacewatch	L5	10 km	MPC · JPL
216293	2007 GP_{11}	—	April 11, 2007	Kitt Peak	Spacewatch	L5	10 km	MPC · JPL
216294	2007 KM_{4}	—	May 24, 2007	Tiki	S. F. Hönig, Teamo, N.	·	1.7 km	MPC · JPL
216295 Menorca	2007 LX_{14}	Menorca	June 11, 2007	La Sagra	OAM	·	4.0 km	MPC · JPL
216296	2007 LR_{22}	—	June 13, 2007	Kitt Peak	Spacewatch	·	2.9 km	MPC · JPL
216297	2007 MP_{2}	—	June 16, 2007	Kitt Peak	Spacewatch	·	4.5 km	MPC · JPL
216298	2007 RK_{37}	—	September 8, 2007	Mount Lemmon	Mount Lemmon Survey	·	1.6 km	MPC · JPL
216299	2007 RO_{86}	—	September 10, 2007	Mount Lemmon	Mount Lemmon Survey	H	680 m	MPC · JPL
216300	2007 RS_{123}	—	September 12, 2007	Catalina	CSS	EUP	4.5 km	MPC · JPL

== 216301–216400 ==
back to top

Designation			Discovery			Properties		Ref
Permanent	Provisional	Named after	Date	Site	Discoverer(s)	Category	Diam.	Ref
216301	2007 RC_{137}	—	September 14, 2007	Mount Lemmon	Mount Lemmon Survey	·	1.4 km	MPC · JPL
216302	2007 RJ_{149}	—	September 12, 2007	Anderson Mesa	LONEOS	CYB	6.8 km	MPC · JPL
216303	2007 RE_{220}	—	September 14, 2007	Mount Lemmon	Mount Lemmon Survey	·	3.4 km	MPC · JPL
216304	2007 SV_{7}	—	September 18, 2007	Kitt Peak	Spacewatch	·	1.5 km	MPC · JPL
216305	2007 TY_{13}	—	October 6, 2007	Socorro	LINEAR	H	680 m	MPC · JPL
216306	2007 TZ_{56}	—	October 4, 2007	Kitt Peak	Spacewatch	·	2.0 km	MPC · JPL
216307	2007 TM_{92}	—	October 5, 2007	Kitt Peak	Spacewatch	L4	10 km	MPC · JPL
216308	2007 TA_{103}	—	October 8, 2007	Mount Lemmon	Mount Lemmon Survey	·	1.3 km	MPC · JPL
216309	2007 TZ_{121}	—	October 6, 2007	Kitt Peak	Spacewatch	MAS	920 m	MPC · JPL
216310	2007 TJ_{125}	—	October 6, 2007	Kitt Peak	Spacewatch	·	780 m	MPC · JPL
216311	2007 TZ_{139}	—	October 9, 2007	Catalina	CSS	PHO	1.6 km	MPC · JPL
216312	2007 TT_{149}	—	October 8, 2007	Socorro	LINEAR	·	4.6 km	MPC · JPL
216313	2007 TL_{157}	—	October 9, 2007	Socorro	LINEAR	·	1.4 km	MPC · JPL
216314	2007 TP_{187}	—	October 13, 2007	Socorro	LINEAR	PHO	1.4 km	MPC · JPL
216315	2007 TJ_{196}	—	October 7, 2007	Mount Lemmon	Mount Lemmon Survey	·	890 m	MPC · JPL
216316	2007 TD_{231}	—	October 8, 2007	Kitt Peak	Spacewatch	V	870 m	MPC · JPL
216317	2007 TK_{234}	—	October 8, 2007	Kitt Peak	Spacewatch	·	1.3 km	MPC · JPL
216318	2007 TB_{241}	—	October 7, 2007	Catalina	CSS	EUN	1.2 km	MPC · JPL
216319 Sanxia	2007 TY_{286}	Sanxia	October 10, 2007	XuYi	PMO NEO Survey Program	·	2.7 km	MPC · JPL
216320	2007 TN_{353}	—	October 8, 2007	Anderson Mesa	LONEOS	·	4.3 km	MPC · JPL
216321	2007 TN_{363}	—	October 14, 2007	Mount Lemmon	Mount Lemmon Survey	·	3.5 km	MPC · JPL
216322	2007 UN_{22}	—	October 16, 2007	Kitt Peak	Spacewatch	·	860 m	MPC · JPL
216323	2007 UF_{48}	—	October 20, 2007	Mount Lemmon	Mount Lemmon Survey	·	4.1 km	MPC · JPL
216324	2007 UN_{98}	—	October 30, 2007	Kitt Peak	Spacewatch	·	1.1 km	MPC · JPL
216325	2007 UH_{100}	—	October 30, 2007	Kitt Peak	Spacewatch	·	1.3 km	MPC · JPL
216326	2007 UP_{123}	—	October 31, 2007	Mount Lemmon	Mount Lemmon Survey	·	1.0 km	MPC · JPL
216327	2007 UP_{129}	—	October 16, 2007	Kitt Peak	Spacewatch	·	3.6 km	MPC · JPL
216328	2007 VG_{8}	—	November 5, 2007	Catalina	CSS	H	840 m	MPC · JPL
216329	2007 VB_{9}	—	November 2, 2007	Mount Lemmon	Mount Lemmon Survey	V	930 m	MPC · JPL
216330	2007 VT_{94}	—	November 7, 2007	Bisei SG Center	BATTeRS	NYS	1.4 km	MPC · JPL
216331 Panjunhua	2007 VG_{125}	Panjunhua	November 5, 2007	XuYi	PMO NEO Survey Program	·	2.0 km	MPC · JPL
216332	2007 VN_{133}	—	November 2, 2007	Catalina	CSS	·	4.4 km	MPC · JPL
216333	2007 VR_{146}	—	November 4, 2007	Mount Lemmon	Mount Lemmon Survey	·	2.3 km	MPC · JPL
216334	2007 VG_{193}	—	November 4, 2007	Mount Lemmon	Mount Lemmon Survey	·	2.6 km	MPC · JPL
216335	2007 VK_{235}	—	November 9, 2007	Kitt Peak	Spacewatch	·	1.4 km	MPC · JPL
216336	2007 VO_{305}	—	November 14, 2007	Mount Lemmon	Mount Lemmon Survey	·	3.9 km	MPC · JPL
216337	2007 VQ_{307}	—	November 3, 2007	Mount Lemmon	Mount Lemmon Survey	AGN	1.3 km	MPC · JPL
216338	2007 WD_{21}	—	November 18, 2007	Mount Lemmon	Mount Lemmon Survey	·	1.5 km	MPC · JPL
216339	2007 WT_{27}	—	November 18, 2007	Mount Lemmon	Mount Lemmon Survey	·	1.8 km	MPC · JPL
216340	2007 WO_{35}	—	November 19, 2007	Mount Lemmon	Mount Lemmon Survey	·	1.5 km	MPC · JPL
216341	2007 WF_{49}	—	November 20, 2007	Mount Lemmon	Mount Lemmon Survey	·	2.9 km	MPC · JPL
216342	2007 WD_{55}	—	November 28, 2007	Marly	P. Kocher	NYS	1.4 km	MPC · JPL
216343 Wenchang	2007 WJ_{56}	Wenchang	November 28, 2007	Lulin	Q. Ye, Lin, H.-C.	·	2.2 km	MPC · JPL
216344	2007 XZ_{1}	—	December 3, 2007	Catalina	CSS	·	1.3 km	MPC · JPL
216345 Savigliano	2007 XC_{11}	Savigliano	December 4, 2007	San Marcello	L. Tesi, M. Mazzucato	·	2.0 km	MPC · JPL
216346	2007 XH_{23}	—	December 14, 2007	Dauban	Chante-Perdrix	TIR	5.1 km	MPC · JPL
216347	2007 YM_{7}	—	December 16, 2007	Kitt Peak	Spacewatch	·	2.4 km	MPC · JPL
216348	2007 YX_{15}	—	December 16, 2007	Kitt Peak	Spacewatch	ADE	2.3 km	MPC · JPL
216349	2007 YJ_{35}	—	December 30, 2007	Mount Lemmon	Mount Lemmon Survey	·	1.1 km	MPC · JPL
216350	2007 YJ_{44}	—	December 30, 2007	Kitt Peak	Spacewatch	·	3.0 km	MPC · JPL
216351	2007 YV_{46}	—	December 30, 2007	Mount Lemmon	Mount Lemmon Survey	·	3.6 km	MPC · JPL
216352	2007 YB_{53}	—	December 30, 2007	Kitt Peak	Spacewatch	·	2.0 km	MPC · JPL
216353	2007 YO_{53}	—	December 30, 2007	Catalina	CSS	·	4.9 km	MPC · JPL
216354	2007 YA_{64}	—	December 30, 2007	Kitt Peak	Spacewatch	·	2.1 km	MPC · JPL
216355	2007 YX_{64}	—	December 30, 2007	Mount Lemmon	Mount Lemmon Survey	·	2.8 km	MPC · JPL
216356	2008 AG_{6}	—	January 10, 2008	Mount Lemmon	Mount Lemmon Survey	·	970 m	MPC · JPL
216357	2008 AB_{13}	—	January 10, 2008	Mount Lemmon	Mount Lemmon Survey	·	2.0 km	MPC · JPL
216358	2008 AT_{17}	—	January 10, 2008	Kitt Peak	Spacewatch	·	1.8 km	MPC · JPL
216359	2008 AX_{24}	—	January 10, 2008	Mount Lemmon	Mount Lemmon Survey	KOR	1.6 km	MPC · JPL
216360	2008 AV_{66}	—	January 11, 2008	Kitt Peak	Spacewatch	·	3.0 km	MPC · JPL
216361	2008 AQ_{68}	—	January 11, 2008	Mount Lemmon	Mount Lemmon Survey	·	3.5 km	MPC · JPL
216362	2008 AL_{83}	—	January 15, 2008	Mount Lemmon	Mount Lemmon Survey	·	2.3 km	MPC · JPL
216363	2008 AF_{85}	—	January 13, 2008	Kitt Peak	Spacewatch	AGN	1.4 km	MPC · JPL
216364	2008 AC_{87}	—	January 12, 2008	Mount Lemmon	Mount Lemmon Survey	AST	3.5 km	MPC · JPL
216365	2008 AS_{88}	—	January 13, 2008	Kitt Peak	Spacewatch	·	1.3 km	MPC · JPL
216366	2008 AP_{95}	—	January 14, 2008	Kitt Peak	Spacewatch	WIT	1.3 km	MPC · JPL
216367	2008 AE_{101}	—	January 14, 2008	Kitt Peak	Spacewatch	·	2.5 km	MPC · JPL
216368 Hypnomys	2008 AS_{101}	Hypnomys	January 14, 2008	Costitx	OAM	·	2.4 km	MPC · JPL
216369	2008 AC_{112}	—	January 10, 2008	Kitt Peak	Spacewatch	·	2.3 km	MPC · JPL
216370	2008 AU_{117}	—	January 10, 2008	Kitt Peak	Spacewatch	·	2.8 km	MPC · JPL
216371	2008 AB_{118}	—	January 12, 2008	Mount Lemmon	Mount Lemmon Survey	·	2.4 km	MPC · JPL
216372	2008 BW_{10}	—	January 18, 2008	Kitt Peak	Spacewatch	(883)	900 m	MPC · JPL
216373	2008 BZ_{15}	—	January 28, 2008	Lulin	LUSS	·	4.0 km	MPC · JPL
216374	2008 BB_{16}	—	January 28, 2008	Lulin	LUSS	·	3.5 km	MPC · JPL
216375	2008 BL_{20}	—	January 30, 2008	Catalina	CSS	·	2.3 km	MPC · JPL
216376	2008 BP_{20}	—	January 30, 2008	Catalina	CSS	·	2.9 km	MPC · JPL
216377	2008 BE_{27}	—	January 30, 2008	Mount Lemmon	Mount Lemmon Survey	KOR	1.7 km	MPC · JPL
216378	2008 BL_{35}	—	January 30, 2008	Kitt Peak	Spacewatch	(1118)	4.7 km	MPC · JPL
216379	2008 BV_{35}	—	January 30, 2008	Kitt Peak	Spacewatch	·	4.9 km	MPC · JPL
216380	2008 BH_{40}	—	January 30, 2008	Socorro	LINEAR	NAE	4.9 km	MPC · JPL
216381	2008 BF_{41}	—	January 30, 2008	Kitt Peak	Spacewatch	·	2.4 km	MPC · JPL
216382	2008 BW_{43}	—	January 30, 2008	Catalina	CSS	·	1.4 km	MPC · JPL
216383	2008 BC_{48}	—	January 16, 2008	Kitt Peak	Spacewatch	THM	3.1 km	MPC · JPL
216384	2008 BR_{48}	—	January 17, 2008	Kitt Peak	Spacewatch	·	2.1 km	MPC · JPL
216385	2008 BX_{49}	—	January 18, 2008	Mount Lemmon	Mount Lemmon Survey	·	1.9 km	MPC · JPL
216386	2008 CY_{35}	—	February 2, 2008	Catalina	CSS	(22805)	3.8 km	MPC · JPL
216387	2008 CQ_{59}	—	February 7, 2008	Mount Lemmon	Mount Lemmon Survey	·	2.3 km	MPC · JPL
216388	2008 CU_{75}	—	February 3, 2008	Mount Lemmon	Mount Lemmon Survey	fast	2.7 km	MPC · JPL
216389	2008 CE_{124}	—	February 7, 2008	Mount Lemmon	Mount Lemmon Survey	·	1.9 km	MPC · JPL
216390 Binnig	2008 CK_{177}	Binnig	February 14, 2008	Taunus	E. Schwab, R. Kling	·	3.1 km	MPC · JPL
216391	2008 CR_{179}	—	February 7, 2008	Catalina	CSS	·	2.4 km	MPC · JPL
216392	2008 CT_{187}	—	February 3, 2008	Catalina	CSS	·	4.2 km	MPC · JPL
216393	2008 CW_{196}	—	February 8, 2008	Kitt Peak	Spacewatch	·	2.9 km	MPC · JPL
216394	2008 DB_{3}	—	February 24, 2008	Mount Lemmon	Mount Lemmon Survey	·	4.1 km	MPC · JPL
216395	2008 DQ_{7}	—	February 24, 2008	Mount Lemmon	Mount Lemmon Survey	EOS	2.8 km	MPC · JPL
216396	2008 DF_{65}	—	February 28, 2008	Catalina	CSS	·	7.1 km	MPC · JPL
216397	2008 EP_{5}	—	March 2, 2008	Kitt Peak	Spacewatch	EOS	2.5 km	MPC · JPL
216398	2008 EP_{22}	—	March 3, 2008	Catalina	CSS	EOS	3.4 km	MPC · JPL
216399	2008 EU_{52}	—	March 6, 2008	Mount Lemmon	Mount Lemmon Survey	·	1.6 km	MPC · JPL
216400	2008 EX_{88}	—	March 8, 2008	Socorro	LINEAR	VER	5.5 km	MPC · JPL

== 216401–216500 ==
back to top

Designation			Discovery			Properties		Ref
Permanent	Provisional	Named after	Date	Site	Discoverer(s)	Category	Diam.	Ref
216401	2008 EK_{90}	—	March 6, 2008	Kitt Peak	Spacewatch	·	840 m	MPC · JPL
216402	2008 ET_{96}	—	March 7, 2008	Mount Lemmon	Mount Lemmon Survey	KOR	1.4 km	MPC · JPL
216403	2008 ER_{105}	—	March 6, 2008	Mount Lemmon	Mount Lemmon Survey	·	3.6 km	MPC · JPL
216404	2008 EY_{108}	—	March 7, 2008	Mount Lemmon	Mount Lemmon Survey	KOR	1.6 km	MPC · JPL
216405	2008 ER_{132}	—	March 11, 2008	Mount Lemmon	Mount Lemmon Survey	·	2.4 km	MPC · JPL
216406	2008 ES_{142}	—	March 13, 2008	Kitt Peak	Spacewatch	·	1.6 km	MPC · JPL
216407	2008 FP_{19}	—	March 27, 2008	Kitt Peak	Spacewatch	·	4.6 km	MPC · JPL
216408	2008 FT_{73}	—	March 30, 2008	Catalina	CSS	3:2	7.5 km	MPC · JPL
216409	2008 GM_{84}	—	April 8, 2008	Mount Lemmon	Mount Lemmon Survey	L5	10 km	MPC · JPL
216410	2008 QG_{18}	—	August 28, 2008	La Sagra	OAM	·	2.1 km	MPC · JPL
216411	2008 RR_{51}	—	September 3, 2008	Kitt Peak	Spacewatch	T_{j} (2.98) · 3:2	7.2 km	MPC · JPL
216412	2008 RF_{54}	—	September 3, 2008	Kitt Peak	Spacewatch	·	3.1 km	MPC · JPL
216413	2008 RR_{68}	—	September 4, 2008	Kitt Peak	Spacewatch	·	6.5 km	MPC · JPL
216414	2008 RE_{94}	—	September 6, 2008	Kitt Peak	Spacewatch	·	3.1 km	MPC · JPL
216415	2008 SF_{61}	—	September 20, 2008	Catalina	CSS	·	4.2 km	MPC · JPL
216416	2008 SD_{92}	—	September 21, 2008	Kitt Peak	Spacewatch	MIS	3.3 km	MPC · JPL
216417	2008 SD_{100}	—	September 21, 2008	Kitt Peak	Spacewatch	URS	6.6 km	MPC · JPL
216418	2008 SQ_{106}	—	September 21, 2008	Kitt Peak	Spacewatch	·	3.7 km	MPC · JPL
216419	2008 SJ_{172}	—	September 21, 2008	Catalina	CSS	L4	13 km	MPC · JPL
216420	2008 SJ_{272}	—	September 22, 2008	Mount Lemmon	Mount Lemmon Survey	·	1.7 km	MPC · JPL
216421	2008 TD_{3}	—	October 1, 2008	Sierra Stars	Tozzi, F.	L4	10 km	MPC · JPL
216422	2008 TJ_{6}	—	October 3, 2008	La Sagra	OAM	·	930 m	MPC · JPL
216423	2008 TZ_{135}	—	October 8, 2008	Kitt Peak	Spacewatch	L4	10 km	MPC · JPL
216424	2008 TZ_{172}	—	October 1, 2008	Mount Lemmon	Mount Lemmon Survey	·	3.5 km	MPC · JPL
216425	2008 UE_{90}	—	October 25, 2008	Dauban	Chante-Perdrix	·	1.4 km	MPC · JPL
216426	2008 WC_{44}	—	November 17, 2008	Kitt Peak	Spacewatch	WIT	1.5 km	MPC · JPL
216427	2008 WT_{94}	—	November 24, 2008	Sierra Stars	Tozzi, F.	HNS	1.8 km	MPC · JPL
216428 Mauricio	2008 YN_{8}	Mauricio	December 23, 2008	Nazaret	Muler, G., Ruiz, J. M.	·	2.1 km	MPC · JPL
216429	2009 BK_{23}	—	January 17, 2009	Kitt Peak	Spacewatch	·	2.8 km	MPC · JPL
216430	2009 BX_{75}	—	January 25, 2009	Kitt Peak	Spacewatch	·	1.5 km	MPC · JPL
216431	2009 BH_{125}	—	January 31, 2009	Kitt Peak	Spacewatch	HYG	3.6 km	MPC · JPL
216432	2009 CT_{37}	—	February 4, 2009	Kitt Peak	Spacewatch	·	5.0 km	MPC · JPL
216433 Milianleo	2009 DM_{3}	Milianleo	February 19, 2009	Tzec Maun	E. Schwab	AEO	1.5 km	MPC · JPL
216434	2009 DZ_{46}	—	February 28, 2009	Socorro	LINEAR	·	4.3 km	MPC · JPL
216435	2009 DT_{58}	—	February 22, 2009	Kitt Peak	Spacewatch	NYS	1.5 km	MPC · JPL
216436	2009 DR_{69}	—	February 26, 2009	Catalina	CSS	·	2.0 km	MPC · JPL
216437	2009 DW_{117}	—	February 27, 2009	Kitt Peak	Spacewatch	·	2.4 km	MPC · JPL
216438	2009 DT_{121}	—	February 27, 2009	Kitt Peak	Spacewatch	·	1.8 km	MPC · JPL
216439 Lyubertsy	2009 EV_{3}	Lyubertsy	March 15, 2009	Tzec Maun	L. Elenin	·	2.6 km	MPC · JPL
216440	2009 EU_{4}	—	March 15, 2009	La Sagra	OAM	MAS	1.0 km	MPC · JPL
216441	2009 EO_{20}	—	March 15, 2009	La Sagra	OAM	MAS	880 m	MPC · JPL
216442	2009 FG_{4}	—	March 18, 2009	Črni Vrh	Mikuž, H.	H	930 m	MPC · JPL
216443	2009 FS_{20}	—	March 18, 2009	Bergisch Gladbach	W. Bickel	·	2.9 km	MPC · JPL
216444	2009 FX_{30}	—	March 19, 2009	La Sagra	OAM	·	1.2 km	MPC · JPL
216445	2009 FK_{34}	—	March 21, 2009	Catalina	CSS	NYS	1.3 km	MPC · JPL
216446 Nanshida	2009 FA_{45}	Nanshida	March 25, 2009	XuYi	PMO NEO Survey Program	·	4.3 km	MPC · JPL
216447	2009 FC_{45}	—	March 26, 2009	Kitt Peak	Spacewatch	·	1.7 km	MPC · JPL
216448	2009 FQ_{55}	—	March 28, 2009	Kitt Peak	Spacewatch	·	1.6 km	MPC · JPL
216449	2009 GG_{1}	—	April 3, 2009	Cerro Burek	Burek, Cerro	THM	4.0 km	MPC · JPL
216450	2009 HH_{3}	—	April 16, 2009	Catalina	CSS	·	1.7 km	MPC · JPL
216451 Irsha	2009 HP_{12}	Irsha	April 19, 2009	Andrushivka	Andrushivka	·	1.4 km	MPC · JPL
216452	2009 HU_{12}	—	April 16, 2009	Catalina	CSS	MAS	1.1 km	MPC · JPL
216453	2009 HE_{24}	—	April 17, 2009	Kitt Peak	Spacewatch	TEL	1.8 km	MPC · JPL
216454	2009 HX_{24}	—	April 17, 2009	Kitt Peak	Spacewatch	·	2.8 km	MPC · JPL
216455	2009 HG_{32}	—	April 19, 2009	Kitt Peak	Spacewatch	·	1.8 km	MPC · JPL
216456	2009 HF_{34}	—	April 19, 2009	Catalina	CSS	·	1.7 km	MPC · JPL
216457	2009 HG_{57}	—	April 20, 2009	La Sagra	OAM	·	1.6 km	MPC · JPL
216458	2009 HG_{59}	—	April 20, 2009	Socorro	LINEAR	·	2.2 km	MPC · JPL
216459	2009 HY_{62}	—	April 22, 2009	Kitt Peak	Spacewatch	V	1.0 km	MPC · JPL
216460	1250 T-2	—	September 29, 1973	Palomar	C. J. van Houten, I. van Houten-Groeneveld, T. Gehrels	(5)	3.5 km	MPC · JPL
216461	2025 T-2	—	September 29, 1973	Palomar	C. J. van Houten, I. van Houten-Groeneveld, T. Gehrels	·	4.3 km	MPC · JPL
216462 Polyphontes	5397 T-2	Polyphontes	September 30, 1973	Palomar	C. J. van Houten, I. van Houten-Groeneveld, T. Gehrels	L4	10 km	MPC · JPL
216463	1849 T-3	—	October 17, 1977	Palomar	C. J. van Houten, I. van Houten-Groeneveld, T. Gehrels	·	4.9 km	MPC · JPL
216464	1974 PB	—	August 12, 1974	Palomar	T. Gehrels	·	1 km	MPC · JPL
216465	1995 VV_{10}	—	November 15, 1995	Kitt Peak	Spacewatch	·	1.5 km	MPC · JPL
216466	1996 AP_{8}	—	January 13, 1996	Kitt Peak	Spacewatch	·	3.8 km	MPC · JPL
216467	1996 MZ	—	June 16, 1996	Kitt Peak	Spacewatch	·	2.1 km	MPC · JPL
216468	1996 XZ_{23}	—	December 5, 1996	Kitt Peak	Spacewatch	·	1.5 km	MPC · JPL
216469	1997 CV_{3}	—	February 3, 1997	Kitt Peak	Spacewatch	NYS	1.4 km	MPC · JPL
216470	1997 UG_{18}	—	October 28, 1997	Kitt Peak	Spacewatch	PAD	2.7 km	MPC · JPL
216471	1997 WK_{12}	—	November 23, 1997	Kitt Peak	Spacewatch	·	1.1 km	MPC · JPL
216472	1999 JQ_{108}	—	May 13, 1999	Socorro	LINEAR	T_{j} (2.99) · EUP	6.1 km	MPC · JPL
216473	1999 RM_{67}	—	September 7, 1999	Socorro	LINEAR	·	4.0 km	MPC · JPL
216474	1999 RT_{79}	—	September 7, 1999	Socorro	LINEAR	·	900 m	MPC · JPL
216475	1999 RD_{110}	—	September 8, 1999	Socorro	LINEAR	·	3.8 km	MPC · JPL
216476	1999 SC_{22}	—	September 23, 1999	Ondřejov	Ondrejov	·	2.6 km	MPC · JPL
216477	1999 TD_{25}	—	October 3, 1999	Socorro	LINEAR	·	1.0 km	MPC · JPL
216478	1999 TP_{207}	—	October 14, 1999	Socorro	LINEAR	·	4.8 km	MPC · JPL
216479	1999 TF_{237}	—	October 3, 1999	Catalina	CSS	·	1.2 km	MPC · JPL
216480	1999 UH_{25}	—	October 28, 1999	Catalina	CSS	EOS	4.1 km	MPC · JPL
216481	1999 VB_{33}	—	November 3, 1999	Socorro	LINEAR	·	4.8 km	MPC · JPL
216482	1999 VZ_{45}	—	November 3, 1999	Socorro	LINEAR	H	940 m	MPC · JPL
216483	1999 VQ_{46}	—	November 3, 1999	Socorro	LINEAR	H	800 m	MPC · JPL
216484	1999 VE_{85}	—	November 6, 1999	Kitt Peak	Spacewatch	MAS	870 m	MPC · JPL
216485	1999 VB_{122}	—	November 4, 1999	Kitt Peak	Spacewatch	·	1.6 km	MPC · JPL
216486	1999 VT_{123}	—	November 5, 1999	Kitt Peak	Spacewatch	MAS	840 m	MPC · JPL
216487	1999 VA_{182}	—	November 9, 1999	Socorro	LINEAR	·	7.6 km	MPC · JPL
216488	1999 VV_{186}	—	November 15, 1999	Socorro	LINEAR	·	3.9 km	MPC · JPL
216489	1999 VE_{202}	—	November 4, 1999	Socorro	LINEAR	BAP	1.5 km	MPC · JPL
216490	1999 XG_{10}	—	December 5, 1999	Catalina	CSS	·	4.8 km	MPC · JPL
216491	1999 XT_{14}	—	December 6, 1999	Socorro	LINEAR	H	820 m	MPC · JPL
216492	1999 XU_{141}	—	December 10, 1999	Socorro	LINEAR	·	3.5 km	MPC · JPL
216493	1999 YY_{15}	—	December 31, 1999	Kitt Peak	Spacewatch	·	4.3 km	MPC · JPL
216494	2000 AH_{51}	—	January 4, 2000	Socorro	LINEAR	·	9.0 km	MPC · JPL
216495	2000 AJ_{201}	—	January 9, 2000	Socorro	LINEAR	H	920 m	MPC · JPL
216496	2000 AQ_{212}	—	January 6, 2000	Kitt Peak	Spacewatch	PHO	1.3 km	MPC · JPL
216497	2000 AY_{221}	—	January 8, 2000	Kitt Peak	Spacewatch	·	2.4 km	MPC · JPL
216498	2000 BH_{1}	—	January 26, 2000	Kitt Peak	Spacewatch	NYS	1.3 km	MPC · JPL
216499	2000 CJ_{22}	—	February 2, 2000	Socorro	LINEAR	·	2.1 km	MPC · JPL
216500	2000 DD_{118}	—	February 26, 2000	Kitt Peak	Spacewatch	·	3.1 km	MPC · JPL

== 216501–216600 ==
back to top

Designation			Discovery			Properties		Ref
Permanent	Provisional	Named after	Date	Site	Discoverer(s)	Category	Diam.	Ref
216501	2000 EP_{203}	—	March 5, 2000	Cerro Tololo	Deep Lens Survey	·	1.8 km	MPC · JPL
216502	2000 GC_{41}	—	April 5, 2000	Socorro	LINEAR	GEF	1.8 km	MPC · JPL
216503	2000 HR_{34}	—	April 25, 2000	Anderson Mesa	LONEOS	·	2.0 km	MPC · JPL
216504	2000 HF_{59}	—	April 25, 2000	Anderson Mesa	LONEOS	·	2.9 km	MPC · JPL
216505	2000 JY_{9}	—	May 5, 2000	Socorro	LINEAR	ADE ·	3.1 km	MPC · JPL
216506	2000 RF_{81}	—	September 1, 2000	Socorro	LINEAR	·	3.8 km	MPC · JPL
216507	2000 RL_{97}	—	September 5, 2000	Anderson Mesa	LONEOS	·	4.4 km	MPC · JPL
216508	2000 RJ_{106}	—	September 3, 2000	Socorro	LINEAR	·	1.1 km	MPC · JPL
216509	2000 SA_{87}	—	September 24, 2000	Socorro	LINEAR	·	1.3 km	MPC · JPL
216510	2000 SG_{106}	—	September 24, 2000	Socorro	LINEAR	·	3.3 km	MPC · JPL
216511	2000 SB_{127}	—	September 24, 2000	Socorro	LINEAR	EOS	3.2 km	MPC · JPL
216512	2000 SS_{289}	—	September 27, 2000	Socorro	LINEAR	·	1.0 km	MPC · JPL
216513	2000 ST_{332}	—	September 26, 2000	Socorro	LINEAR	·	4.2 km	MPC · JPL
216514	2000 UN_{48}	—	October 24, 2000	Socorro	LINEAR	·	1.2 km	MPC · JPL
216515	2000 VF_{45}	—	November 1, 2000	Socorro	LINEAR	·	870 m	MPC · JPL
216516	2000 WQ_{21}	—	November 26, 2000	Needville	A. Cruz, W. G. Dillon	·	1.4 km	MPC · JPL
216517	2000 WF_{127}	—	November 17, 2000	Kitt Peak	Spacewatch	·	1.3 km	MPC · JPL
216518	2000 YZ_{48}	—	December 30, 2000	Socorro	LINEAR	·	5.4 km	MPC · JPL
216519	2001 FP_{24}	—	March 17, 2001	Socorro	LINEAR	·	1.5 km	MPC · JPL
216520	2001 FA_{75}	—	March 19, 2001	Socorro	LINEAR	·	1.2 km	MPC · JPL
216521	2001 FX_{109}	—	March 18, 2001	Socorro	LINEAR	·	2.4 km	MPC · JPL
216522	2001 HQ_{6}	—	April 18, 2001	Kitt Peak	Spacewatch	HOF	5.0 km	MPC · JPL
216523	2001 HY_{7}	—	April 18, 2001	Socorro	LINEAR	ATE · PHA · fast	260 m	MPC · JPL
216524	2001 HM_{20}	—	April 27, 2001	Modra	Galád, A., Tóth	·	2.2 km	MPC · JPL
216525	2001 MY_{20}	—	June 25, 2001	Haleakala	NEAT	·	2.6 km	MPC · JPL
216526	2001 NZ_{19}	—	July 12, 2001	Palomar	NEAT	·	2.0 km	MPC · JPL
216527	2001 OD_{6}	—	July 17, 2001	Anderson Mesa	LONEOS	·	2.4 km	MPC · JPL
216528	2001 OQ_{66}	—	July 23, 2001	Palomar	NEAT	H	780 m	MPC · JPL
216529	2001 OH_{84}	—	July 29, 2001	Haleakala	NEAT	·	2.3 km	MPC · JPL
216530	2001 OF_{111}	—	July 20, 2001	Palomar	NEAT	·	3.1 km	MPC · JPL
216531	2001 QA_{135}	—	August 22, 2001	Socorro	LINEAR	·	1.5 km	MPC · JPL
216532	2001 QW_{193}	—	August 22, 2001	Socorro	LINEAR	·	2.5 km	MPC · JPL
216533	2001 QU_{195}	—	August 22, 2001	Socorro	LINEAR	EUN	2.1 km	MPC · JPL
216534	2001 QP_{225}	—	August 24, 2001	Anderson Mesa	LONEOS	·	1.9 km	MPC · JPL
216535	2001 QB_{261}	—	August 25, 2001	Socorro	LINEAR	·	2.7 km	MPC · JPL
216536	2001 QZ_{272}	—	August 19, 2001	Socorro	LINEAR	·	4.4 km	MPC · JPL
216537	2001 QL_{292}	—	August 16, 2001	Palomar	NEAT	·	2.0 km	MPC · JPL
216538	2001 RS_{128}	—	September 12, 2001	Socorro	LINEAR	·	3.0 km	MPC · JPL
216539	2001 RX_{148}	—	September 10, 2001	Anderson Mesa	LONEOS	EUN	1.3 km	MPC · JPL
216540	2001 SO_{4}	—	September 18, 2001	Goodricke-Pigott	R. A. Tucker	·	2.5 km	MPC · JPL
216541	2001 SN_{29}	—	September 16, 2001	Socorro	LINEAR	EUN	1.5 km	MPC · JPL
216542	2001 SF_{38}	—	September 16, 2001	Socorro	LINEAR	EUN	2.1 km	MPC · JPL
216543	2001 SK_{116}	—	September 20, 2001	Socorro	LINEAR	·	1.4 km	MPC · JPL
216544	2001 SP_{120}	—	September 16, 2001	Socorro	LINEAR	·	1.4 km	MPC · JPL
216545	2001 ST_{235}	—	September 19, 2001	Socorro	LINEAR	·	2.4 km	MPC · JPL
216546	2001 SH_{292}	—	September 16, 2001	Socorro	LINEAR	·	2.1 km	MPC · JPL
216547	2001 SS_{305}	—	September 20, 2001	Socorro	LINEAR	·	3.2 km	MPC · JPL
216548	2001 TP_{115}	—	October 14, 2001	Socorro	LINEAR	·	3.5 km	MPC · JPL
216549	2001 TZ_{126}	—	October 13, 2001	Kitt Peak	Spacewatch	MRX	1.1 km	MPC · JPL
216550	2001 TK_{172}	—	October 13, 2001	Socorro	LINEAR	·	4.8 km	MPC · JPL
216551	2001 TA_{184}	—	October 14, 2001	Socorro	LINEAR	L5	10 km	MPC · JPL
216552	2001 UD_{29}	—	October 16, 2001	Socorro	LINEAR	HOF	3.4 km	MPC · JPL
216553	2001 UY_{165}	—	October 23, 2001	Palomar	NEAT	·	2.0 km	MPC · JPL
216554	2001 UJ_{173}	—	October 18, 2001	Palomar	NEAT	·	3.0 km	MPC · JPL
216555	2001 VM_{11}	—	November 10, 2001	Socorro	LINEAR	·	3.1 km	MPC · JPL
216556	2001 VF_{16}	—	November 11, 2001	Socorro	LINEAR	·	450 m	MPC · JPL
216557	2001 VC_{21}	—	November 9, 2001	Socorro	LINEAR	·	2.3 km	MPC · JPL
216558	2001 VF_{47}	—	November 9, 2001	Socorro	LINEAR	·	3.1 km	MPC · JPL
216559	2001 VB_{69}	—	November 11, 2001	Socorro	LINEAR	·	2.8 km	MPC · JPL
216560	2001 WP_{47}	—	November 19, 2001	Anderson Mesa	LONEOS	·	6.5 km	MPC · JPL
216561	2001 WT_{97}	—	November 19, 2001	Anderson Mesa	LONEOS	·	2.7 km	MPC · JPL
216562	2001 XF_{2}	—	December 8, 2001	Socorro	LINEAR	H	1.1 km	MPC · JPL
216563	2001 XS_{29}	—	December 11, 2001	Socorro	LINEAR	JUN	2.7 km	MPC · JPL
216564	2001 XX_{227}	—	December 15, 2001	Socorro	LINEAR	·	2.9 km	MPC · JPL
216565	2001 YO_{28}	—	December 18, 2001	Socorro	LINEAR	·	2.7 km	MPC · JPL
216566	2001 YB_{51}	—	December 18, 2001	Socorro	LINEAR	·	5.8 km	MPC · JPL
216567	2002 AU_{28}	—	January 7, 2002	Anderson Mesa	LONEOS	·	4.9 km	MPC · JPL
216568	2002 AQ_{159}	—	January 13, 2002	Socorro	LINEAR	·	1.1 km	MPC · JPL
216569	2002 AO_{170}	—	January 14, 2002	Socorro	LINEAR	EOS	3.4 km	MPC · JPL
216570	2002 CW_{54}	—	February 7, 2002	Socorro	LINEAR	·	1.3 km	MPC · JPL
216571	2002 CS_{76}	—	February 7, 2002	Socorro	LINEAR	·	730 m	MPC · JPL
216572	2002 CC_{137}	—	February 8, 2002	Socorro	LINEAR	·	5.6 km	MPC · JPL
216573	2002 CJ_{253}	—	February 3, 2002	Cima Ekar	ADAS	VER	3.9 km	MPC · JPL
216574	2002 CX_{258}	—	February 6, 2002	Anderson Mesa	LONEOS	·	3.3 km	MPC · JPL
216575	2002 CE_{279}	—	February 7, 2002	Palomar	NEAT	(883)	920 m	MPC · JPL
216576	2002 DY_{10}	—	February 19, 2002	Socorro	LINEAR	·	5.9 km	MPC · JPL
216577	2002 DO_{11}	—	February 20, 2002	Socorro	LINEAR	·	1.8 km	MPC · JPL
216578	2002 EB_{144}	—	March 13, 2002	Palomar	NEAT	·	940 m	MPC · JPL
216579	2002 FU_{29}	—	March 20, 2002	Socorro	LINEAR	·	6.7 km	MPC · JPL
216580	2002 GH_{38}	—	April 2, 2002	Kitt Peak	Spacewatch	·	1.1 km	MPC · JPL
216581	2002 GX_{82}	—	April 10, 2002	Socorro	LINEAR	·	1.2 km	MPC · JPL
216582	2002 GE_{112}	—	April 10, 2002	Socorro	LINEAR	·	1.1 km	MPC · JPL
216583	2002 GW_{131}	—	April 12, 2002	Socorro	LINEAR	·	1.4 km	MPC · JPL
216584	2002 HQ_{3}	—	April 16, 2002	Socorro	LINEAR	·	6.0 km	MPC · JPL
216585	2002 JS_{19}	—	May 7, 2002	Palomar	NEAT	·	1.0 km	MPC · JPL
216586	2002 KU_{4}	—	May 16, 2002	Socorro	LINEAR	·	1.5 km	MPC · JPL
216587	2002 LD_{23}	—	June 8, 2002	Socorro	LINEAR	·	1.2 km	MPC · JPL
216588	2002 LM_{26}	—	June 6, 2002	Socorro	LINEAR	·	1.2 km	MPC · JPL
216589	2002 LB_{29}	—	June 9, 2002	Socorro	LINEAR	·	1.4 km	MPC · JPL
216590	2002 LC_{47}	—	June 15, 2002	Kingsnake	J. V. McClusky	·	1.2 km	MPC · JPL
216591 Coetzee	2002 OQ_{7}	Coetzee	July 21, 2002	Campo Catino	G. Masi	·	1.9 km	MPC · JPL
216592	2002 OW_{7}	—	July 22, 2002	Palomar	NEAT	·	1.3 km	MPC · JPL
216593	2002 OF_{17}	—	July 18, 2002	Socorro	LINEAR	·	960 m	MPC · JPL
216594	2002 OP_{21}	—	July 17, 2002	Palomar	NEAT	·	1.3 km	MPC · JPL
216595	2002 PB_{8}	—	August 3, 2002	Palomar	NEAT	·	990 m	MPC · JPL
216596	2002 PE_{105}	—	August 12, 2002	Socorro	LINEAR	·	1.2 km	MPC · JPL
216597	2002 PR_{127}	—	August 14, 2002	Socorro	LINEAR	·	1.5 km	MPC · JPL
216598	2002 PO_{137}	—	August 15, 2002	Socorro	LINEAR	NYS	1.5 km	MPC · JPL
216599	2002 PC_{158}	—	August 8, 2002	Palomar	S. F. Hönig	·	1.8 km	MPC · JPL
216600	2002 QW_{13}	—	August 26, 2002	Palomar	NEAT	ERI	1.8 km	MPC · JPL

== 216601–216700 ==
back to top

Designation			Discovery			Properties		Ref
Permanent	Provisional	Named after	Date	Site	Discoverer(s)	Category	Diam.	Ref
216601	2002 RN_{7}	—	September 3, 2002	Haleakala	NEAT	·	5.5 km	MPC · JPL
216602	2002 RQ_{19}	—	September 4, 2002	Anderson Mesa	LONEOS	PHO	1.4 km	MPC · JPL
216603	2002 RX_{39}	—	September 5, 2002	Socorro	LINEAR	·	4.3 km	MPC · JPL
216604	2002 TA_{1}	—	October 1, 2002	Anderson Mesa	LONEOS	NYS	1.8 km	MPC · JPL
216605	2002 TJ_{8}	—	October 1, 2002	Haleakala	NEAT	·	1.6 km	MPC · JPL
216606	2002 TO_{8}	—	October 1, 2002	Haleakala	NEAT	·	1.7 km	MPC · JPL
216607	2002 TY_{99}	—	October 4, 2002	Anderson Mesa	LONEOS	·	2.6 km	MPC · JPL
216608	2002 TB_{109}	—	October 1, 2002	Haleakala	NEAT	·	2.4 km	MPC · JPL
216609	2002 TU_{178}	—	October 12, 2002	Socorro	LINEAR	·	3.1 km	MPC · JPL
216610	2002 TC_{217}	—	October 7, 2002	Palomar	NEAT	·	1.6 km	MPC · JPL
216611	2002 TA_{223}	—	October 7, 2002	Socorro	LINEAR	·	1.7 km	MPC · JPL
216612	2002 TB_{271}	—	October 9, 2002	Socorro	LINEAR	PHO	1.3 km	MPC · JPL
216613	2002 TU_{281}	—	October 10, 2002	Socorro	LINEAR	T_{j} (2.95) · HIL	10 km	MPC · JPL
216614	2002 TR_{376}	—	October 5, 2002	Palomar	NEAT	V	800 m	MPC · JPL
216615	2002 UK_{46}	—	October 30, 2002	Socorro	LINEAR	T_{j} (2.97) · HIL · 3:2 · (6124)	7.2 km	MPC · JPL
216616	2002 VK_{11}	—	November 1, 2002	Palomar	NEAT	·	1.7 km	MPC · JPL
216617	2002 VO_{72}	—	November 7, 2002	Socorro	LINEAR	NYS	1.7 km	MPC · JPL
216618	2002 VW_{84}	—	November 7, 2002	Socorro	LINEAR	·	2.9 km	MPC · JPL
216619	2002 VM_{128}	—	November 14, 2002	Socorro	LINEAR	·	2.5 km	MPC · JPL
216620	2002 VP_{133}	—	November 5, 2002	Socorro	LINEAR	·	5.2 km	MPC · JPL
216621	2002 VD_{136}	—	November 8, 2002	Socorro	LINEAR	·	2.6 km	MPC · JPL
216622	2002 WQ_{7}	—	November 24, 2002	Palomar	NEAT	·	1.0 km	MPC · JPL
216623	2002 WZ_{27}	—	November 23, 2002	Palomar	NEAT	·	1.2 km	MPC · JPL
216624 Kaufer	2002 XW_{37}	Kaufer	December 9, 2002	Heppenheim	Starkenburg	·	2.3 km	MPC · JPL
216625	2002 XA_{77}	—	December 11, 2002	Socorro	LINEAR	PHO	2.3 km	MPC · JPL
216626	2002 YP_{9}	—	December 31, 2002	Socorro	LINEAR	NEM	3.2 km	MPC · JPL
216627	2002 YM_{27}	—	December 31, 2002	Socorro	LINEAR	(5)	2.2 km	MPC · JPL
216628	2002 YX_{30}	—	December 31, 2002	Socorro	LINEAR	·	2.9 km	MPC · JPL
216629	2003 AT_{6}	—	January 2, 2003	Socorro	LINEAR	·	2.5 km	MPC · JPL
216630	2003 AX_{38}	—	January 7, 2003	Socorro	LINEAR	·	3.0 km	MPC · JPL
216631	2003 BN_{24}	—	January 25, 2003	Palomar	NEAT	GAL	2.4 km	MPC · JPL
216632	2003 BX_{27}	—	January 26, 2003	Palomar	NEAT	·	3.4 km	MPC · JPL
216633	2003 BH_{46}	—	January 27, 2003	Haleakala	NEAT	H · slow	900 m	MPC · JPL
216634	2003 EB_{40}	—	March 8, 2003	Socorro	LINEAR	TIR	3.8 km	MPC · JPL
216635	2003 FH_{3}	—	March 24, 2003	Socorro	LINEAR	EUP	6.0 km	MPC · JPL
216636	2003 FK_{96}	—	March 30, 2003	Socorro	LINEAR	·	6.9 km	MPC · JPL
216637	2003 FV_{131}	—	March 23, 2003	Apache Point	SDSS	·	5.1 km	MPC · JPL
216638	2003 GX_{8}	—	April 1, 2003	Socorro	LINEAR	TIR	3.4 km	MPC · JPL
216639	2003 GK_{21}	—	April 7, 2003	Kitt Peak	Spacewatch	·	1.7 km	MPC · JPL
216640	2003 GN_{42}	—	April 6, 2003	Anderson Mesa	LONEOS	TIR	3.9 km	MPC · JPL
216641	2003 GS_{42}	—	April 8, 2003	Palomar	NEAT	·	3.7 km	MPC · JPL
216642	2003 GE_{48}	—	April 9, 2003	Palomar	NEAT	·	3.2 km	MPC · JPL
216643	2003 KW_{9}	—	May 26, 2003	Haleakala	NEAT	·	4.7 km	MPC · JPL
216644	2003 QY_{17}	—	August 22, 2003	Palomar	NEAT	·	880 m	MPC · JPL
216645	2003 QD_{42}	—	August 22, 2003	Socorro	LINEAR	·	1.3 km	MPC · JPL
216646	2003 QT_{56}	—	August 23, 2003	Socorro	LINEAR	·	1.6 km	MPC · JPL
216647	2003 QZ_{103}	—	August 31, 2003	Haleakala	NEAT	·	1.4 km	MPC · JPL
216648	2003 SY_{206}	—	September 26, 2003	Socorro	LINEAR	·	2.0 km	MPC · JPL
216649	2003 SA_{208}	—	September 26, 2003	Socorro	LINEAR	·	3.1 km	MPC · JPL
216650	2003 TE_{11}	—	October 14, 2003	Anderson Mesa	LONEOS	·	1.3 km	MPC · JPL
216651	2003 TB_{49}	—	October 3, 2003	Kitt Peak	Spacewatch	·	1.4 km	MPC · JPL
216652	2003 UG_{15}	—	October 16, 2003	Kitt Peak	Spacewatch	·	820 m	MPC · JPL
216653	2003 UJ_{20}	—	October 22, 2003	Socorro	LINEAR	·	1 km	MPC · JPL
216654	2003 UT_{117}	—	October 30, 2003	Socorro	LINEAR	·	1.1 km	MPC · JPL
216655	2003 UA_{142}	—	October 18, 2003	Anderson Mesa	LONEOS	·	1.0 km	MPC · JPL
216656	2003 UM_{155}	—	October 20, 2003	Socorro	LINEAR	·	1.2 km	MPC · JPL
216657	2003 UL_{202}	—	October 21, 2003	Socorro	LINEAR	V	880 m	MPC · JPL
216658	2003 UE_{315}	—	October 28, 2003	Socorro	LINEAR	·	830 m	MPC · JPL
216659	2003 UP_{368}	—	October 21, 2003	Kitt Peak	Spacewatch	·	1.3 km	MPC · JPL
216660	2003 WO_{138}	—	November 21, 2003	Socorro	LINEAR	·	1.1 km	MPC · JPL
216661	2003 XM_{11}	—	December 12, 2003	Palomar	NEAT	·	1.5 km	MPC · JPL
216662	2003 XN_{41}	—	December 14, 2003	Palomar	NEAT	·	1.2 km	MPC · JPL
216663	2003 YB_{36}	—	December 19, 2003	Haleakala	NEAT	·	2.3 km	MPC · JPL
216664	2003 YZ_{51}	—	December 18, 2003	Socorro	LINEAR	·	2.0 km	MPC · JPL
216665	2003 YT_{87}	—	December 19, 2003	Socorro	LINEAR	HNS	1.7 km	MPC · JPL
216666	2004 AX_{20}	—	January 15, 2004	Kitt Peak	Spacewatch	·	1.6 km	MPC · JPL
216667	2004 BD_{16}	—	January 18, 2004	Palomar	NEAT	(5)	1.9 km	MPC · JPL
216668	2004 BJ_{38}	—	January 19, 2004	Catalina	CSS	JUN	1.5 km	MPC · JPL
216669	2004 BH_{42}	—	January 19, 2004	Catalina	CSS	·	2.0 km	MPC · JPL
216670	2004 BK_{52}	—	January 21, 2004	Socorro	LINEAR	·	3.4 km	MPC · JPL
216671	2004 BC_{57}	—	January 23, 2004	Socorro	LINEAR	·	2.6 km	MPC · JPL
216672	2004 BL_{72}	—	January 23, 2004	Socorro	LINEAR	·	1.8 km	MPC · JPL
216673	2004 BL_{87}	—	January 23, 2004	Anderson Mesa	LONEOS	·	1.9 km	MPC · JPL
216674	2004 BK_{106}	—	January 26, 2004	Anderson Mesa	LONEOS	·	1.8 km	MPC · JPL
216675	2004 BV_{108}	—	January 28, 2004	Catalina	CSS	·	3.1 km	MPC · JPL
216676	2004 CV_{1}	—	February 10, 2004	Palomar	NEAT	·	2.3 km	MPC · JPL
216677	2004 DK_{6}	—	February 16, 2004	Kitt Peak	Spacewatch	·	2.3 km	MPC · JPL
216678	2004 DD_{46}	—	February 19, 2004	Socorro	LINEAR	EUN	1.3 km	MPC · JPL
216679	2004 DC_{47}	—	February 19, 2004	Socorro	LINEAR	·	2.8 km	MPC · JPL
216680	2004 EC_{17}	—	March 12, 2004	Palomar	NEAT	·	3.6 km	MPC · JPL
216681	2004 EX_{93}	—	March 15, 2004	Socorro	LINEAR	·	2.3 km	MPC · JPL
216682	2004 FN_{137}	—	March 29, 2004	Socorro	LINEAR	·	2.1 km	MPC · JPL
216683	2004 GT_{3}	—	April 10, 2004	Catalina	CSS	·	2.8 km	MPC · JPL
216684	2004 GF_{5}	—	April 11, 2004	Palomar	NEAT	DOR	5.1 km	MPC · JPL
216685	2004 GM_{45}	—	April 12, 2004	Kitt Peak	Spacewatch	·	2.8 km	MPC · JPL
216686	2004 GW_{57}	—	April 14, 2004	Kitt Peak	Spacewatch	·	2.0 km	MPC · JPL
216687	2004 GB_{61}	—	April 15, 2004	Anderson Mesa	LONEOS	·	2.5 km	MPC · JPL
216688	2004 GA_{82}	—	April 13, 2004	Catalina	CSS	·	2.9 km	MPC · JPL
216689	2004 HM_{1}	—	April 19, 2004	Socorro	LINEAR	AMO +1km	1.4 km	MPC · JPL
216690	2004 HM_{11}	—	April 19, 2004	Socorro	LINEAR	DOR	3.8 km	MPC · JPL
216691	2004 HM_{30}	—	April 21, 2004	Socorro	LINEAR	·	3.6 km	MPC · JPL
216692	2004 HW_{50}	—	April 23, 2004	Haleakala	NEAT	·	3.8 km	MPC · JPL
216693	2004 NM_{7}	—	July 14, 2004	Socorro	LINEAR	·	4.7 km	MPC · JPL
216694	2004 OO_{5}	—	July 16, 2004	Siding Spring	SSS	H	820 m	MPC · JPL
216695	2004 QY_{4}	—	August 21, 2004	Goodricke-Pigott	R. A. Tucker	H	800 m	MPC · JPL
216696	2004 QB_{7}	—	August 22, 2004	Reedy Creek	J. Broughton	EOS	3.3 km	MPC · JPL
216697	2004 QX_{17}	—	August 19, 2004	Socorro	LINEAR	·	4.5 km	MPC · JPL
216698	2004 RW_{142}	—	September 8, 2004	Palomar	NEAT	·	7.2 km	MPC · JPL
216699	2004 RC_{154}	—	September 10, 2004	Socorro	LINEAR	·	5.3 km	MPC · JPL
216700	2004 RH_{155}	—	September 10, 2004	Socorro	LINEAR	·	3.5 km	MPC · JPL

== 216701–216800 ==
back to top

Designation			Discovery			Properties		Ref
Permanent	Provisional	Named after	Date	Site	Discoverer(s)	Category	Diam.	Ref
216701	2004 RW_{162}	—	September 11, 2004	Socorro	LINEAR	·	5.1 km	MPC · JPL
216702	2004 RO_{174}	—	September 10, 2004	Socorro	LINEAR	V	1.0 km	MPC · JPL
216703	2004 RD_{175}	—	September 10, 2004	Socorro	LINEAR	·	3.7 km	MPC · JPL
216704	2004 RQ_{210}	—	September 11, 2004	Socorro	LINEAR	·	5.9 km	MPC · JPL
216705	2004 RU_{252}	—	September 15, 2004	Socorro	LINEAR	H	760 m	MPC · JPL
216706	2004 TU_{240}	—	October 10, 2004	Socorro	LINEAR	·	4.8 km	MPC · JPL
216707	2004 XP_{164}	—	December 12, 2004	Catalina	CSS	AMO +1km	1.1 km	MPC · JPL
216708	2004 YZ_{19}	—	December 18, 2004	Mount Lemmon	Mount Lemmon Survey	·	1.3 km	MPC · JPL
216709	2005 AH_{60}	—	January 15, 2005	Socorro	LINEAR	·	840 m	MPC · JPL
216710	2005 CC_{14}	—	February 2, 2005	Kitt Peak	Spacewatch	·	920 m	MPC · JPL
216711	2005 CD_{51}	—	February 2, 2005	Kitt Peak	Spacewatch	NYS	1.1 km	MPC · JPL
216712	2005 EN_{1}	—	March 3, 2005	Mayhill	Lowe, A.	·	1.3 km	MPC · JPL
216713	2005 EX_{7}	—	March 1, 2005	Kitt Peak	Spacewatch	·	1.6 km	MPC · JPL
216714	2005 EQ_{26}	—	March 3, 2005	Catalina	CSS	MAS	860 m	MPC · JPL
216715	2005 EN_{31}	—	March 2, 2005	Catalina	CSS	·	1.3 km	MPC · JPL
216716	2005 EK_{58}	—	March 4, 2005	Kitt Peak	Spacewatch	V	850 m	MPC · JPL
216717	2005 EJ_{86}	—	March 4, 2005	Socorro	LINEAR	·	1.5 km	MPC · JPL
216718	2005 EN_{125}	—	March 8, 2005	Mount Lemmon	Mount Lemmon Survey	·	1.5 km	MPC · JPL
216719	2005 EQ_{156}	—	March 9, 2005	Catalina	CSS	·	1.3 km	MPC · JPL
216720	2005 EW_{198}	—	March 11, 2005	Mount Lemmon	Mount Lemmon Survey	NYS	1.4 km	MPC · JPL
216721	2005 EX_{199}	—	March 12, 2005	Kitt Peak	Spacewatch	·	3.6 km	MPC · JPL
216722	2005 EC_{286}	—	March 1, 2005	Catalina	CSS	·	2.2 km	MPC · JPL
216723	2005 GX_{9}	—	April 1, 2005	Goodricke-Pigott	Reddy, V.	·	1.7 km	MPC · JPL
216724	2005 GD_{21}	—	April 3, 2005	Palomar	NEAT	·	1.4 km	MPC · JPL
216725	2005 GV_{43}	—	April 5, 2005	Anderson Mesa	LONEOS	·	1.4 km	MPC · JPL
216726	2005 GY_{50}	—	April 1, 2005	Anderson Mesa	LONEOS	PHO	2.3 km	MPC · JPL
216727	2005 GE_{69}	—	April 2, 2005	Catalina	CSS	PHO	1.8 km	MPC · JPL
216728	2005 GC_{97}	—	April 6, 2005	Mount Lemmon	Mount Lemmon Survey	NYS	1.7 km	MPC · JPL
216729	2005 GT_{115}	—	April 11, 2005	Kitt Peak	Spacewatch	·	1.6 km	MPC · JPL
216730	2005 GE_{123}	—	April 6, 2005	Mount Lemmon	Mount Lemmon Survey	MAS	960 m	MPC · JPL
216731	2005 GG_{156}	—	April 10, 2005	Mount Lemmon	Mount Lemmon Survey	·	2.1 km	MPC · JPL
216732	2005 GA_{169}	—	April 12, 2005	Kitt Peak	Spacewatch	·	2.0 km	MPC · JPL
216733	2005 HN_{2}	—	April 17, 2005	Kitt Peak	Spacewatch	·	1.7 km	MPC · JPL
216734	2005 JP_{15}	—	May 3, 2005	Kitt Peak	Spacewatch	·	1.4 km	MPC · JPL
216735	2005 JN_{23}	—	May 3, 2005	Kitt Peak	Spacewatch	·	1.1 km	MPC · JPL
216736	2005 JU_{30}	—	May 4, 2005	Kitt Peak	Spacewatch	·	2.1 km	MPC · JPL
216737	2005 JK_{83}	—	May 8, 2005	Kitt Peak	Spacewatch	·	1.5 km	MPC · JPL
216738	2005 JA_{90}	—	May 11, 2005	Mount Lemmon	Mount Lemmon Survey	·	1.7 km	MPC · JPL
216739	2005 JH_{128}	—	May 12, 2005	Socorro	LINEAR	·	1.9 km	MPC · JPL
216740	2005 JR_{154}	—	May 4, 2005	Mount Lemmon	Mount Lemmon Survey	NYS	1.7 km	MPC · JPL
216741	2005 KG_{11}	—	May 30, 2005	Catalina	CSS	BAR	2.2 km	MPC · JPL
216742	2005 LX_{5}	—	June 3, 2005	Catalina	CSS	·	2.1 km	MPC · JPL
216743	2005 LC_{45}	—	June 13, 2005	Kitt Peak	Spacewatch	·	1.7 km	MPC · JPL
216744	2005 MN_{16}	—	June 25, 2005	Palomar	NEAT	·	2.7 km	MPC · JPL
216745	2005 MG_{47}	—	June 28, 2005	Palomar	NEAT	·	2.2 km	MPC · JPL
216746	2005 NR_{3}	—	July 1, 2005	Kitt Peak	Spacewatch	·	2.0 km	MPC · JPL
216747	2005 NC_{10}	—	July 3, 2005	Mount Lemmon	Mount Lemmon Survey	·	1.8 km	MPC · JPL
216748	2005 NT_{12}	—	July 4, 2005	Palomar	NEAT	·	1.9 km	MPC · JPL
216749	2005 NR_{39}	—	July 7, 2005	Reedy Creek	J. Broughton	·	2.9 km	MPC · JPL
216750	2005 NR_{60}	—	July 10, 2005	Kitt Peak	Spacewatch	·	2.3 km	MPC · JPL
216751	2005 ON_{31}	—	July 18, 2005	Palomar	NEAT	EOS	2.8 km	MPC · JPL
216752 Kirbyrunyon	2005 PR_{23}	Kirbyrunyon	August 10, 2005	Cerro Tololo	M. W. Buie	·	2.8 km	MPC · JPL
216753	2005 QG_{31}	—	August 22, 2005	Palomar	NEAT	·	2.1 km	MPC · JPL
216754	2005 QO_{68}	—	August 28, 2005	Siding Spring	SSS	·	1.1 km	MPC · JPL
216755	2005 QF_{83}	—	August 29, 2005	Anderson Mesa	LONEOS	·	3.2 km	MPC · JPL
216756	2005 QU_{127}	—	August 28, 2005	Kitt Peak	Spacewatch	·	2.5 km	MPC · JPL
216757 Vasari	2005 RT_{32}	Vasari	September 13, 2005	Vallemare Borbona	V. S. Casulli	·	4.0 km	MPC · JPL
216758	2005 SX_{36}	—	September 24, 2005	Kitt Peak	Spacewatch	·	2.5 km	MPC · JPL
216759	2005 SG_{45}	—	September 24, 2005	Kitt Peak	Spacewatch	·	3.8 km	MPC · JPL
216760	2005 SC_{74}	—	September 24, 2005	Kitt Peak	Spacewatch	·	2.4 km	MPC · JPL
216761	2005 SD_{124}	—	September 29, 2005	Anderson Mesa	LONEOS	·	4.3 km	MPC · JPL
216762	2005 SU_{134}	—	September 29, 2005	Goodricke-Pigott	R. A. Tucker	·	3.2 km	MPC · JPL
216763	2005 SW_{160}	—	September 27, 2005	Kitt Peak	Spacewatch	·	3.0 km	MPC · JPL
216764	2005 TF_{99}	—	October 7, 2005	Catalina	CSS	·	2.9 km	MPC · JPL
216765	2005 TG_{99}	—	October 7, 2005	Catalina	CSS	·	5.1 km	MPC · JPL
216766	2005 UK_{69}	—	October 23, 2005	Palomar	NEAT	·	5.5 km	MPC · JPL
216767	2005 UV_{159}	—	October 22, 2005	Catalina	CSS	·	2.9 km	MPC · JPL
216768	2005 UL_{199}	—	October 25, 2005	Kitt Peak	Spacewatch	THM	3.2 km	MPC · JPL
216769	2005 UD_{382}	—	October 26, 2005	Socorro	LINEAR	·	5.1 km	MPC · JPL
216770	2005 VX_{4}	—	November 3, 2005	Socorro	LINEAR	·	3.8 km	MPC · JPL
216771	2005 WC_{45}	—	November 22, 2005	Kitt Peak	Spacewatch	3:2	6.0 km	MPC · JPL
216772	2005 WY_{74}	—	November 25, 2005	Kitt Peak	Spacewatch	HYG	3.3 km	MPC · JPL
216773	2006 BR_{8}	—	January 17, 2006	Palomar	NEAT	·	1.6 km	MPC · JPL
216774	2006 HK_{31}	—	April 18, 2006	Palomar	NEAT	·	1.1 km	MPC · JPL
216775	2006 HX_{38}	—	April 21, 2006	Kitt Peak	Spacewatch	VER	7.2 km	MPC · JPL
216776	2006 JC_{80}	—	May 6, 2006	Mount Lemmon	Mount Lemmon Survey	·	830 m	MPC · JPL
216777	2006 QV_{18}	—	August 17, 2006	Socorro	LINEAR	MAS	1.0 km	MPC · JPL
216778	2006 QG_{25}	—	August 18, 2006	Anderson Mesa	LONEOS	·	3.6 km	MPC · JPL
216779	2006 QL_{26}	—	August 19, 2006	Palomar	NEAT	·	840 m	MPC · JPL
216780 Lilianne	2006 QP_{57}	Lilianne	August 27, 2006	Wrightwood	J. W. Young	·	870 m	MPC · JPL
216781	2006 QQ_{62}	—	August 23, 2006	Socorro	LINEAR	·	950 m	MPC · JPL
216782	2006 QG_{116}	—	August 27, 2006	Anderson Mesa	LONEOS	V	860 m	MPC · JPL
216783	2006 QO_{122}	—	August 29, 2006	Catalina	CSS	·	3.0 km	MPC · JPL
216784	2006 QV_{182}	—	August 19, 2006	Kitt Peak	Spacewatch	NYS	1.4 km	MPC · JPL
216785	2006 RF_{36}	—	September 14, 2006	Palomar	NEAT	V	870 m	MPC · JPL
216786	2006 RQ_{56}	—	September 14, 2006	Kitt Peak	Spacewatch	·	1.2 km	MPC · JPL
216787	2006 RC_{66}	—	September 14, 2006	Kitt Peak	Spacewatch	·	2.2 km	MPC · JPL
216788	2006 RQ_{90}	—	September 15, 2006	Kitt Peak	Spacewatch	·	2.5 km	MPC · JPL
216789	2006 SU_{1}	—	September 16, 2006	Kitt Peak	Spacewatch	·	1.8 km	MPC · JPL
216790	2006 SD_{15}	—	September 17, 2006	Catalina	CSS	·	2.5 km	MPC · JPL
216791	2006 SA_{17}	—	September 17, 2006	Kitt Peak	Spacewatch	·	1.9 km	MPC · JPL
216792	2006 SN_{21}	—	September 17, 2006	Catalina	CSS	·	1.0 km	MPC · JPL
216793	2006 SJ_{23}	—	September 17, 2006	Anderson Mesa	LONEOS	·	1.9 km	MPC · JPL
216794	2006 SE_{24}	—	September 18, 2006	Catalina	CSS	·	2.3 km	MPC · JPL
216795	2006 SA_{50}	—	September 19, 2006	La Sagra	OAM	(12739)	2.6 km	MPC · JPL
216796	2006 SA_{94}	—	September 18, 2006	Kitt Peak	Spacewatch	NYS	1.1 km	MPC · JPL
216797	2006 SM_{135}	—	September 20, 2006	Palomar	NEAT	·	2.2 km	MPC · JPL
216798	2006 SG_{218}	—	September 27, 2006	La Sagra	OAM	·	1.7 km	MPC · JPL
216799	2006 SM_{218}	—	September 28, 2006	La Sagra	OAM	·	2.3 km	MPC · JPL
216800	2006 SC_{271}	—	September 27, 2006	Socorro	LINEAR	·	1.4 km	MPC · JPL

== 216801–216900 ==
back to top

Designation			Discovery			Properties		Ref
Permanent	Provisional	Named after	Date	Site	Discoverer(s)	Category	Diam.	Ref
216801	2006 SW_{315}	—	September 27, 2006	Kitt Peak	Spacewatch	MAS	810 m	MPC · JPL
216802	2006 SP_{358}	—	September 30, 2006	Catalina	CSS	·	2.2 km	MPC · JPL
216803	2006 SA_{379}	—	September 18, 2006	Apache Point	A. C. Becker	EUN ·	2.8 km	MPC · JPL
216804	2006 SD_{381}	—	September 27, 2006	Apache Point	A. C. Becker	·	3.8 km	MPC · JPL
216805	2006 SU_{388}	—	September 30, 2006	Apache Point	A. C. Becker	·	4.1 km	MPC · JPL
216806	2006 SC_{390}	—	September 30, 2006	Apache Point	A. C. Becker	·	2.3 km	MPC · JPL
216807	2006 SE_{392}	—	September 19, 2006	Catalina	CSS	·	2.2 km	MPC · JPL
216808 Tolmárgyula	2006 TG_{11}	Tolmárgyula	October 14, 2006	Piszkéstető	K. Sárneczky, Kuli, Z.	MAS	760 m	MPC · JPL
216809	2006 TU_{31}	—	October 12, 2006	Kitt Peak	Spacewatch	·	1.5 km	MPC · JPL
216810	2006 TT_{49}	—	October 12, 2006	Palomar	NEAT	HOF	4.6 km	MPC · JPL
216811	2006 TK_{65}	—	October 11, 2006	Palomar	NEAT	·	5.2 km	MPC · JPL
216812	2006 TA_{118}	—	October 3, 2006	Apache Point	A. C. Becker	EOS	1.8 km	MPC · JPL
216813	2006 UO_{16}	—	October 17, 2006	Mount Lemmon	Mount Lemmon Survey	EOS	2.5 km	MPC · JPL
216814	2006 UO_{69}	—	October 16, 2006	Catalina	CSS	·	3.1 km	MPC · JPL
216815	2006 UM_{83}	—	October 17, 2006	Mount Lemmon	Mount Lemmon Survey	·	2.3 km	MPC · JPL
216816	2006 UH_{84}	—	October 17, 2006	Mount Lemmon	Mount Lemmon Survey	·	3.3 km	MPC · JPL
216817	2006 UX_{95}	—	October 18, 2006	Kitt Peak	Spacewatch	(12739)	1.9 km	MPC · JPL
216818	2006 UQ_{231}	—	October 21, 2006	Palomar	NEAT	·	2.3 km	MPC · JPL
216819	2006 UK_{253}	—	October 27, 2006	Mount Lemmon	Mount Lemmon Survey	·	1.8 km	MPC · JPL
216820	2006 UP_{266}	—	October 27, 2006	Kitt Peak	Spacewatch	KOR	1.8 km	MPC · JPL
216821	2006 UK_{285}	—	October 28, 2006	Mount Lemmon	Mount Lemmon Survey	·	2.6 km	MPC · JPL
216822	2006 VD_{7}	—	November 10, 2006	Kitt Peak	Spacewatch	·	3.1 km	MPC · JPL
216823	2006 VL_{31}	—	November 11, 2006	Kitt Peak	Spacewatch	EOS	2.1 km	MPC · JPL
216824	2006 VZ_{56}	—	November 11, 2006	Kitt Peak	Spacewatch	·	4.2 km	MPC · JPL
216825	2006 VB_{68}	—	November 11, 2006	Kitt Peak	Spacewatch	·	3.0 km	MPC · JPL
216826	2006 VX_{68}	—	November 11, 2006	Kitt Peak	Spacewatch	·	1.5 km	MPC · JPL
216827	2006 VE_{100}	—	November 11, 2006	Mount Lemmon	Mount Lemmon Survey	THM	2.5 km	MPC · JPL
216828	2006 VO_{100}	—	November 11, 2006	Catalina	CSS	AGN ·	4.3 km	MPC · JPL
216829	2006 VC_{126}	—	November 15, 2006	Kitt Peak	Spacewatch	·	2.0 km	MPC · JPL
216830	2006 VX_{130}	—	November 15, 2006	Catalina	CSS	·	1.9 km	MPC · JPL
216831	2006 VN_{131}	—	November 15, 2006	Kitt Peak	Spacewatch	·	1.4 km	MPC · JPL
216832	2006 VQ_{131}	—	November 15, 2006	Catalina	CSS	EUN	2.3 km	MPC · JPL
216833	2006 VL_{150}	—	November 9, 2006	Palomar	NEAT	·	1.9 km	MPC · JPL
216834	2006 WY_{25}	—	November 18, 2006	Kitt Peak	Spacewatch	·	3.9 km	MPC · JPL
216835	2006 WC_{42}	—	November 16, 2006	Mount Lemmon	Mount Lemmon Survey	·	980 m	MPC · JPL
216836	2006 WW_{54}	—	November 16, 2006	Kitt Peak	Spacewatch	·	2.5 km	MPC · JPL
216837	2006 WE_{110}	—	November 19, 2006	Kitt Peak	Spacewatch	·	4.2 km	MPC · JPL
216838	2006 WD_{140}	—	November 19, 2006	Kitt Peak	Spacewatch	·	3.5 km	MPC · JPL
216839	2006 WD_{199}	—	November 25, 2006	Kitt Peak	Spacewatch	·	2.3 km	MPC · JPL
216840	2006 WN_{201}	—	November 17, 2006	Kitt Peak	Spacewatch	·	4.3 km	MPC · JPL
216841	2006 XQ_{31}	—	December 12, 2006	Kitt Peak	Spacewatch	(5)	2.2 km	MPC · JPL
216842	2006 XY_{37}	—	December 11, 2006	Kitt Peak	Spacewatch	·	5.3 km	MPC · JPL
216843	2006 XE_{53}	—	December 14, 2006	Mount Lemmon	Mount Lemmon Survey	·	2.9 km	MPC · JPL
216844	2006 XY_{65}	—	December 12, 2006	Palomar	NEAT	·	4.0 km	MPC · JPL
216845	2006 YR_{1}	—	December 17, 2006	Mount Lemmon	Mount Lemmon Survey	·	2.3 km	MPC · JPL
216846	2006 YD_{7}	—	December 20, 2006	Palomar	NEAT	·	4.2 km	MPC · JPL
216847	2007 EP_{212}	—	March 8, 2007	Palomar	NEAT	L5	10 km	MPC · JPL
216848	2007 TC_{58}	—	October 4, 2007	Kitt Peak	Spacewatch	V	1.1 km	MPC · JPL
216849	2007 TX_{231}	—	October 8, 2007	Kitt Peak	Spacewatch	·	1.9 km	MPC · JPL
216850	2007 UV_{128}	—	October 24, 2007	Mount Lemmon	Mount Lemmon Survey	·	3.6 km	MPC · JPL
216851	2007 VS_{168}	—	November 5, 2007	Kitt Peak	Spacewatch	V	1.0 km	MPC · JPL
216852	2007 VR_{257}	—	November 13, 2007	Catalina	CSS	·	2.7 km	MPC · JPL
216853	2007 WK_{43}	—	November 19, 2007	Kitt Peak	Spacewatch	·	1.1 km	MPC · JPL
216854	2007 XX_{9}	—	December 5, 2007	Mount Lemmon	Mount Lemmon Survey	H	1.0 km	MPC · JPL
216855	2007 YW_{20}	—	December 16, 2007	Mount Lemmon	Mount Lemmon Survey	GAL	2.0 km	MPC · JPL
216856	2007 YU_{61}	—	December 30, 2007	Mount Lemmon	Mount Lemmon Survey	·	4.3 km	MPC · JPL
216857	2008 AF_{24}	—	January 10, 2008	Mount Lemmon	Mount Lemmon Survey	·	1.5 km	MPC · JPL
216858	2008 AL_{85}	—	January 13, 2008	Kitt Peak	Spacewatch	·	1.6 km	MPC · JPL
216859	2008 AP_{101}	—	January 7, 2008	La Sagra	OAM	·	3.6 km	MPC · JPL
216860	2008 BX_{18}	—	January 29, 2008	La Sagra	OAM	EOS	2.8 km	MPC · JPL
216861	2008 BF_{35}	—	January 30, 2008	Mount Lemmon	Mount Lemmon Survey	·	2.6 km	MPC · JPL
216862	2008 BK_{35}	—	January 30, 2008	Kitt Peak	Spacewatch	·	2.6 km	MPC · JPL
216863	2008 BF_{44}	—	January 30, 2008	Catalina	CSS	·	3.1 km	MPC · JPL
216864	2008 BG_{44}	—	January 30, 2008	Catalina	CSS	MAR	1.8 km	MPC · JPL
216865	2008 BH_{46}	—	January 30, 2008	Mount Lemmon	Mount Lemmon Survey	·	1.7 km	MPC · JPL
216866	2008 CY_{169}	—	February 12, 2008	Mount Lemmon	Mount Lemmon Survey	·	2.1 km	MPC · JPL
216867	2008 CP_{197}	—	February 9, 2008	Kitt Peak	Spacewatch	·	2.3 km	MPC · JPL
216868	2008 DT_{9}	—	February 26, 2008	Kitt Peak	Spacewatch	PAD	2.2 km	MPC · JPL
216869	2008 DR_{24}	—	February 28, 2008	Mount Lemmon	Mount Lemmon Survey	·	3.4 km	MPC · JPL
216870	2008 DL_{44}	—	February 28, 2008	Kitt Peak	Spacewatch	·	2.6 km	MPC · JPL
216871	2008 DV_{68}	—	February 29, 2008	Kitt Peak	Spacewatch	·	3.1 km	MPC · JPL
216872	2008 DB_{81}	—	February 26, 2008	Mount Lemmon	Mount Lemmon Survey	·	3.8 km	MPC · JPL
216873	2008 DA_{84}	—	February 18, 2008	Mount Lemmon	Mount Lemmon Survey	·	2.6 km	MPC · JPL
216874	2008 EC_{6}	—	March 2, 2008	Mount Lemmon	Mount Lemmon Survey	·	2.6 km	MPC · JPL
216875	2008 EF_{40}	—	March 4, 2008	Kitt Peak	Spacewatch	·	5.5 km	MPC · JPL
216876	2008 EL_{54}	—	March 6, 2008	Kitt Peak	Spacewatch	L5	12 km	MPC · JPL
216877	2008 FS_{54}	—	March 28, 2008	Mount Lemmon	Mount Lemmon Survey	L5	8.9 km	MPC · JPL
216878	2008 FL_{60}	—	March 29, 2008	Catalina	CSS	·	4.3 km	MPC · JPL
216879	2008 FS_{76}	—	March 27, 2008	Kitt Peak	Spacewatch	·	3.6 km	MPC · JPL
216880	2008 FF_{118}	—	March 31, 2008	Mount Lemmon	Mount Lemmon Survey	·	3.8 km	MPC · JPL
216881	2008 GA_{32}	—	April 3, 2008	Kitt Peak	Spacewatch	L5	11 km	MPC · JPL
216882	2008 KE	—	May 26, 2008	Junk Bond	D. Healy	KOR	2.2 km	MPC · JPL
216883	2008 QG_{41}	—	August 21, 2008	Kitt Peak	Spacewatch	L4	10 km	MPC · JPL
216884	2008 SR_{5}	—	September 22, 2008	Socorro	LINEAR	·	2.0 km	MPC · JPL
216885	2008 SD_{268}	—	September 24, 2008	Kitt Peak	Spacewatch	·	3.7 km	MPC · JPL
216886	2008 US_{47}	—	October 20, 2008	Kitt Peak	Spacewatch	·	3.8 km	MPC · JPL
216887	2008 UR_{83}	—	October 22, 2008	Mount Lemmon	Mount Lemmon Survey	·	2.9 km	MPC · JPL
216888 Sankovich	2008 VS_{3}	Sankovich	November 2, 2008	Zelenchukskaya Stn	T. V. Krjačko	·	2.9 km	MPC · JPL
216889	2008 YW_{17}	—	December 21, 2008	Mount Lemmon	Mount Lemmon Survey	·	2.1 km	MPC · JPL
216890	2008 YL_{91}	—	December 29, 2008	Kitt Peak	Spacewatch	GEF	2.0 km	MPC · JPL
216891	2009 DN_{43}	—	February 27, 2009	Kitt Peak	Spacewatch	L5	10 km	MPC · JPL
216892	2009 DS_{83}	—	February 24, 2009	Kitt Peak	Spacewatch	·	2.3 km	MPC · JPL
216893 Navina	2009 DP_{111}	Navina	February 28, 2009	Wildberg	R. Apitzsch	EUN	1.7 km	MPC · JPL
216894	2009 FK_{2}	—	March 17, 2009	La Sagra	OAM	·	2.8 km	MPC · JPL
216895	2009 HQ_{28}	—	April 18, 2009	Catalina	CSS	·	2.5 km	MPC · JPL
216896	2009 HQ_{54}	—	April 20, 2009	Kitt Peak	Spacewatch	·	3.2 km	MPC · JPL
216897 Golubev	2009 HJ_{58}	Golubev	April 24, 2009	Vitebsk	Nevski, V.	·	4.7 km	MPC · JPL
216898	2009 HJ_{84}	—	April 27, 2009	Kitt Peak	Spacewatch	L5	10 km	MPC · JPL
216899	2009 HL_{84}	—	April 27, 2009	Kitt Peak	Spacewatch	·	2.5 km	MPC · JPL
216900	2009 HV_{84}	—	April 27, 2009	Kitt Peak	Spacewatch	·	2.8 km	MPC · JPL

== 216901–217000 ==
back to top

Designation			Discovery			Properties		Ref
Permanent	Provisional	Named after	Date	Site	Discoverer(s)	Category	Diam.	Ref
216901	2009 HO_{88}	—	April 23, 2009	La Sagra	OAM	·	1.0 km	MPC · JPL
216902	2009 HA_{92}	—	April 29, 2009	Kitt Peak	Spacewatch	·	990 m	MPC · JPL
216903	2009 HD_{94}	—	April 28, 2009	Cerro Burek	Burek, Cerro	·	2.3 km	MPC · JPL
216904	2009 HP_{95}	—	April 16, 2009	Catalina	CSS	MAS	1.0 km	MPC · JPL
216905	2009 HR_{95}	—	April 18, 2009	Kitt Peak	Spacewatch	THM	4.5 km	MPC · JPL
216906	2009 HX_{96}	—	April 30, 2009	Kitt Peak	Spacewatch	·	4.0 km	MPC · JPL
216907	2009 JG	—	May 2, 2009	La Sagra	OAM	MAR	2.5 km	MPC · JPL
216908	2009 JQ	—	May 3, 2009	La Sagra	OAM	·	2.8 km	MPC · JPL
216909	2009 JB_{1}	—	May 4, 2009	La Sagra	OAM	·	2.8 km	MPC · JPL
216910 Vnukov	2009 JM_{4}	Vnukov	May 13, 2009	Andrushivka	Andrushivka	·	4.8 km	MPC · JPL
216911	2009 KJ_{4}	—	May 24, 2009	Mayhill	Lowe, A.	·	1.5 km	MPC · JPL
216912	2009 KW_{7}	—	May 22, 2009	Cerro Burek	Burek, Cerro	·	820 m	MPC · JPL
216913	4533 P-L	—	September 24, 1960	Palomar	C. J. van Houten, I. van Houten-Groeneveld, T. Gehrels	·	1.8 km	MPC · JPL
216914	1084 T-2	—	September 29, 1973	Palomar	C. J. van Houten, I. van Houten-Groeneveld, T. Gehrels	NYS	1.5 km	MPC · JPL
216915	1194 T-2	—	September 29, 1973	Palomar	C. J. van Houten, I. van Houten-Groeneveld, T. Gehrels	·	2.0 km	MPC · JPL
216916	1159 T-3	—	October 17, 1977	Palomar	C. J. van Houten, I. van Houten-Groeneveld, T. Gehrels	·	4.3 km	MPC · JPL
216917	1990 TH_{1}	—	October 14, 1990	Kitt Peak	Spacewatch	·	800 m	MPC · JPL
216918	1995 UT_{23}	—	October 19, 1995	Kitt Peak	Spacewatch	·	1.7 km	MPC · JPL
216919	1996 AK_{8}	—	January 13, 1996	Kitt Peak	Spacewatch	·	6.4 km	MPC · JPL
216920	1996 GW_{9}	—	April 13, 1996	Kitt Peak	Spacewatch	·	3.6 km	MPC · JPL
216921	1996 VC_{3}	—	November 9, 1996	Modra	L. Kornoš, P. Kolény	·	2.3 km	MPC · JPL
216922	1997 MZ_{7}	—	June 29, 1997	Kitt Peak	Spacewatch	·	3.2 km	MPC · JPL
216923	1998 DM_{12}	—	February 23, 1998	Kitt Peak	Spacewatch	(883)	900 m	MPC · JPL
216924	1998 QV_{53}	—	August 26, 1998	Woomera	F. B. Zoltowski	CLA ·	2.2 km	MPC · JPL
216925	1998 QE_{72}	—	August 24, 1998	Socorro	LINEAR	·	5.5 km	MPC · JPL
216926	1998 QR_{88}	—	August 24, 1998	Socorro	LINEAR	·	2.6 km	MPC · JPL
216927	1998 QQ_{89}	—	August 24, 1998	Socorro	LINEAR	·	2.1 km	MPC · JPL
216928	1998 QB_{98}	—	August 28, 1998	Socorro	LINEAR	·	6.3 km	MPC · JPL
216929	1998 QR_{99}	—	August 26, 1998	La Silla	E. W. Elst	NYS	1.6 km	MPC · JPL
216930	1998 SD_{69}	—	September 19, 1998	Socorro	LINEAR	·	1.2 km	MPC · JPL
216931	1998 UM_{16}	—	October 23, 1998	Višnjan	K. Korlević	·	2.4 km	MPC · JPL
216932	1998 VM_{2}	—	November 10, 1998	Caussols	ODAS	MAS	1.3 km	MPC · JPL
216933	1998 YP_{21}	—	December 26, 1998	Kitt Peak	Spacewatch	·	4.7 km	MPC · JPL
216934	1999 KT_{19}	—	May 16, 1999	Catalina	CSS	·	4.8 km	MPC · JPL
216935	1999 RJ_{43}	—	September 13, 1999	Eskridge	G. Bell, G. Hug	·	1.6 km	MPC · JPL
216936	1999 RS_{126}	—	September 9, 1999	Socorro	LINEAR	·	1.1 km	MPC · JPL
216937	1999 RP_{137}	—	September 9, 1999	Socorro	LINEAR	·	1.2 km	MPC · JPL
216938	1999 RU_{204}	—	September 8, 1999	Socorro	LINEAR	·	3.0 km	MPC · JPL
216939	1999 SQ_{13}	—	September 30, 1999	Kitt Peak	Spacewatch	·	1.0 km	MPC · JPL
216940	1999 TM_{16}	—	October 13, 1999	Ondřejov	P. Kušnirák, P. Pravec	·	4.3 km	MPC · JPL
216941	1999 TX_{20}	—	October 7, 1999	Goodricke-Pigott	R. A. Tucker	·	960 m	MPC · JPL
216942	1999 TF_{58}	—	October 6, 1999	Kitt Peak	Spacewatch	·	4.0 km	MPC · JPL
216943	1999 TZ_{60}	—	October 7, 1999	Kitt Peak	Spacewatch	·	2.2 km	MPC · JPL
216944	1999 TC_{61}	—	October 7, 1999	Kitt Peak	Spacewatch	·	770 m	MPC · JPL
216945	1999 TA_{108}	—	October 4, 1999	Socorro	LINEAR	·	3.3 km	MPC · JPL
216946	1999 TN_{236}	—	October 3, 1999	Catalina	CSS	·	840 m	MPC · JPL
216947	1999 TM_{258}	—	October 9, 1999	Socorro	LINEAR	·	910 m	MPC · JPL
216948	1999 TV_{322}	—	October 14, 1999	Socorro	LINEAR	·	5.1 km	MPC · JPL
216949	1999 UA_{63}	—	October 19, 1999	Socorro	LINEAR	·	3.6 km	MPC · JPL
216950	1999 VF_{46}	—	November 3, 1999	Socorro	LINEAR	PHO	1.2 km	MPC · JPL
216951	1999 VV_{94}	—	November 9, 1999	Socorro	LINEAR	·	3.2 km	MPC · JPL
216952	1999 VS_{102}	—	November 9, 1999	Socorro	LINEAR	·	4.3 km	MPC · JPL
216953	1999 VS_{172}	—	November 14, 1999	Socorro	LINEAR	·	4.3 km	MPC · JPL
216954	1999 XG_{44}	—	December 7, 1999	Socorro	LINEAR	·	1.1 km	MPC · JPL
216955	1999 XB_{46}	—	December 7, 1999	Socorro	LINEAR	·	1.4 km	MPC · JPL
216956	1999 XN_{72}	—	December 7, 1999	Socorro	LINEAR	·	6.2 km	MPC · JPL
216957	1999 XH_{225}	—	December 13, 1999	Kitt Peak	Spacewatch	NYS	1.3 km	MPC · JPL
216958	2000 AK_{24}	—	January 3, 2000	Socorro	LINEAR	·	1.5 km	MPC · JPL
216959	2000 AG_{26}	—	January 3, 2000	Socorro	LINEAR	·	1.9 km	MPC · JPL
216960	2000 AD_{51}	—	January 3, 2000	Socorro	LINEAR	·	8.4 km	MPC · JPL
216961	2000 AW_{195}	—	January 8, 2000	Socorro	LINEAR	·	4.4 km	MPC · JPL
216962	2000 AW_{227}	—	January 12, 2000	Kitt Peak	Spacewatch	H	880 m	MPC · JPL
216963	2000 BX_{36}	—	January 30, 2000	Kitt Peak	Spacewatch	MAS	1.2 km	MPC · JPL
216964	2000 CG_{31}	—	February 2, 2000	Socorro	LINEAR	V	1.2 km	MPC · JPL
216965	2000 DH_{58}	—	February 29, 2000	Socorro	LINEAR	·	3.9 km	MPC · JPL
216966	2000 EW_{4}	—	March 2, 2000	Kitt Peak	Spacewatch	EOS	2.6 km	MPC · JPL
216967	2000 EJ_{64}	—	March 10, 2000	Socorro	LINEAR	·	1.3 km	MPC · JPL
216968	2000 EO_{80}	—	March 5, 2000	Socorro	LINEAR	·	1.8 km	MPC · JPL
216969	2000 EL_{81}	—	March 5, 2000	Socorro	LINEAR	·	2.8 km	MPC · JPL
216970	2000 FX_{55}	—	March 27, 2000	Anderson Mesa	LONEOS	BAR	2.0 km	MPC · JPL
216971	2000 JG_{75}	—	May 5, 2000	Socorro	LINEAR	·	1.4 km	MPC · JPL
216972	2000 KQ_{12}	—	May 28, 2000	Socorro	LINEAR	·	2.3 km	MPC · JPL
216973	2000 KG_{36}	—	May 27, 2000	Socorro	LINEAR	·	2.7 km	MPC · JPL
216974	2000 KW_{58}	—	May 24, 2000	Anderson Mesa	LONEOS	·	2.6 km	MPC · JPL
216975	2000 NS_{3}	—	July 7, 2000	Socorro	LINEAR	JUN	3.0 km	MPC · JPL
216976	2000 NO_{13}	—	July 5, 2000	Anderson Mesa	LONEOS	·	4.4 km	MPC · JPL
216977	2000 OA_{1}	—	July 25, 2000	Prescott	P. G. Comba	·	2.8 km	MPC · JPL
216978	2000 OE_{17}	—	July 23, 2000	Socorro	LINEAR	slow	2.4 km	MPC · JPL
216979	2000 QB_{2}	—	August 24, 2000	Socorro	LINEAR	·	2.0 km	MPC · JPL
216980	2000 QU_{21}	—	August 24, 2000	Socorro	LINEAR	V	1.2 km	MPC · JPL
216981	2000 QD_{22}	—	August 24, 2000	Socorro	LINEAR	·	2.4 km	MPC · JPL
216982	2000 QU_{38}	—	August 24, 2000	Socorro	LINEAR	EUN	2.5 km	MPC · JPL
216983	2000 QG_{51}	—	August 24, 2000	Socorro	LINEAR	·	2.6 km	MPC · JPL
216984	2000 QX_{117}	—	August 25, 2000	Socorro	LINEAR	DOR	4.2 km	MPC · JPL
216985	2000 QK_{130}	—	August 31, 2000	Socorro	LINEAR	APO · PHA	190 m	MPC · JPL
216986	2000 QG_{158}	—	August 31, 2000	Socorro	LINEAR	EUN	2.1 km	MPC · JPL
216987	2000 QP_{162}	—	August 31, 2000	Socorro	LINEAR	·	3.5 km	MPC · JPL
216988	2000 QR_{223}	—	August 21, 2000	Anderson Mesa	LONEOS	·	2.9 km	MPC · JPL
216989	2000 RB_{14}	—	September 1, 2000	Socorro	LINEAR	GEF	2.7 km	MPC · JPL
216990	2000 RT_{20}	—	September 1, 2000	Socorro	LINEAR	·	1.3 km	MPC · JPL
216991	2000 RC_{25}	—	September 1, 2000	Socorro	LINEAR	·	3.8 km	MPC · JPL
216992	2000 RO_{40}	—	September 3, 2000	Socorro	LINEAR	·	5.2 km	MPC · JPL
216993	2000 SQ	—	September 19, 2000	Kitt Peak	Spacewatch	·	3.1 km	MPC · JPL
216994	2000 SM_{19}	—	September 23, 2000	Socorro	LINEAR	·	3.1 km	MPC · JPL
216995	2000 SS_{46}	—	September 23, 2000	Socorro	LINEAR	·	3.4 km	MPC · JPL
216996	2000 SN_{48}	—	September 23, 2000	Socorro	LINEAR	·	2.8 km	MPC · JPL
216997	2000 ST_{51}	—	September 23, 2000	Socorro	LINEAR	·	2.6 km	MPC · JPL
216998	2000 SP_{52}	—	September 24, 2000	Socorro	LINEAR	·	3.2 km	MPC · JPL
216999	2000 SW_{52}	—	September 24, 2000	Socorro	LINEAR	·	2.8 km	MPC · JPL
217000	2000 SS_{92}	—	September 23, 2000	Socorro	LINEAR	·	3.2 km	MPC · JPL

back to top

== See also ==
- Meanings of minor-planet names: 216001–217000
