= Erwin Schwab =

German amateur astronomer (born 1964)

Minor planets discovered: 87
see § List of discovered minor planets

Erwin Schwab (born 1964) is a German amateur astronomer and discoverer of minor planets, who works at the GSI Helmholtz Centre for Heavy Ion Research, near Darmstadt, Germany. He has discovered and co-discovered more than 80 asteroids from the Starkenburg (611), Tzec Maun (D25) and Taunus observatories (B01). As volunteer scientist for the European Space Agency (ESA) he recovered near-Earth objects and comets. From 2014 to 2021 he recovered 30 lost comets, which equates to about 25% of the worldwide proportion in that timespan. Using the Schmidt telescope at Calar Alto Observatory (Z84) to search for a lost comet he discovered in 2019 a unique variable star – the first known eclipsing stream-fed intermediate polar, cataloged as J1832.4-1627 (VSX-Id of AAVSO: 000-BNG-512)

== Biography ==
Schwab was born in Heppenheim, where he started observing minor planets at the Starkenburg Observatory in 1981.

== Honors and awards ==
The Observatorio Astronómico de La Sagra in Spain has named the main-belt asteroid 185638 Erwinschwab in his honour.

== Discoveries ==
One which he discovered is named after his parents, Elfriede and Erwin Schwab. Schwab has discovered asteroids at Starkenburg, Tzec Maun as well as at the Taunus Observatory. Some minor planet are named for German cities such as 204852 Frankfurt, 241418 Darmstadt, and 243440 Colonia (Cologne), while the Jupiter-trojans 192220 Oicles and 221917 Opites are named after figures from Greek mythology. He also co-discovered 2009 DM_{45}, an unnumbered Apollo asteroid and potentially hazardous object.

=== List of discovered minor planets ===
192220 Oicles	14 September 2007	list^{[A]}
204852 Frankfurt	15 September 2007	list^{[A]}
204873 FAIR	17 September 2007	list^{[A]}
207687 Senckenberg	12 September 2007	list^{[A]}
207901 Tzecmaun	28 October 2008	list
216390 Binnig	14 February 2008	list^{[A]}
216433 Milianleo	19 February 2009	list
221917 Opites	26 September 2008	list^{[B]}
224831 Neeffisis	27 November 2006	list^{[A]}
241418 Darmstadt	31 October 2008	list
243109 Hansludwig	12 September 2007	list^{[B]}
243440 Colonia	17 March 2009	list^{[B]}
243536 Mannheim	15 March 2010	list
256813 Marburg	11 February 2008	list^{[A]}
(263391) 2008 DA	16 February 2008	list^{[A]}
263932 Speyer	22 April 2009	list
264020 Stuttgart	17 August 2009	list
274020 Skywalker	12 September 2007	list^{[B]}
274835 Aachen	22 August 2009	list
278141 Tatooine	15 February 2007	list^{[B]}
(278417) 2007 RR_{146}	14 September 2007	list^{[A]}
(279037) 2008 VU_{13}	8 November 2008	list
281140 Trier	16 February 2007	list^{[A]}
281661 Michaelsiems	8 November 2008	list
283117 Bonn	1 November 2008	list

283142 Weena	29 December 2008	list^{[A]}
(284941) 2010 EB_{21}	9 March 2010	list^{[A]}
(295476) 2008 QN_{23}	29 August 2008	list^{[A]}
295565 Hannover	27 September 2008	list^{[B]}
(295987) 2008 YA_{66}	29 December 2008	list^{[A]}
(296362) 2009 FU_{25}	21 March 2009	list^{[A]}
(296530) 2009 OV_{9}	28 July 2009	list
301061 Egelsbach	28 October 2008	list
301394 Bensheim	23 February 2009	list
(301625) 2010 EC_{21}	9 March 2010	list^{[A]}
(309274) 2007 RB_{133}	15 September 2007	list^{[A]}
(309911) 2009 FG_{2}	17 March 2009	list^{[A]}
(312558) 2009 GC	2 April 2009	list^{[A]}
(315251) 2007 SJ_{11}	16 September 2007	list^{[A]}
316042 Tilofranz	19 April 2009	list
(325557) 2009 SK_{101}	22 September 2009	list^{[A]}
325558 Guyane	24 September 2009	list
328477 Eckstein	21 April 2009	list
(332633) 2008 UK_{4}	24 October 2008	list
336698 Melbourne	5 February 2010	list
(342277) 2008 TE_{10}	8 October 2008	list
343000 Ijontichy	29 January 2009	list^{[C]}
(343138) 2009 FG_{32}	28 March 2009	list
(343323) 2010 CP_{1}	8 February 2010	list
343444 Halluzinelle	7 March 2010	list^{[B]}

(343981) 2011 LA_{27}	7 March 2010	list^{[B]}
(346865) 2009 FJ_{3}	17 March 2009	list^{[C]}
(347020) 2010 EV_{20}	7 March 2010	list^{[B]}
(352162) 2007 RV_{15}	12 September 2007	list^{[A]}
(352705) 2008 SC_{152}	28 September 2008	list^{[A]}
(352945) 2009 BL_{10}	21 January 2009	list
(356104) 2009 FC_{4}	18 March 2009	list^{[B]}
(365243) 2009 MV_{7}	25 June 2009	list
367436 Siena	27 September 2008	list^{[B]}
369134 Mariareiche	8 September 2008	list^{[C]}
369297 Nazca	23 September 2009	list^{[B]}
(371868) 2008 CQ_{21}	7 February 2008	list^{[C]}
(375156) 2008 CZ_{116}	11 February 2008	list^{[A]}
(375668) 2009 FW_{1}	17 March 2009	list^{[A]}
376084 Annettepeter	3 November 2010	list
378214 Sauron	14 January 2007	list^{[A]}
(378791) 2008 SQ_{84}	27 September 2008	list^{[A]}
378917 Stefankarge	28 October 2008	list
379155 Volkerheinrich	18 August 2009	list
(384539) 2010 EA_{21}	9 March 2010	list^{[A]}
(389280) 2009 HQ_{46}	20 April 2009	list^{[A]}
389293 Hasubick	19 May 2009	list
(400775) 2010 EK_{21}	9 March 2010	list^{[A]}
(410193) 2007 RG_{133}	15 September 2007	list^{[A]}
(410965) 2009 TG_{4}	13 October 2009	list

(414309) 2008 RF_{79}	8 September 2008	list^{[A]}
(414444) 2009 FC_{2}	17 March 2009	list^{[A]}
(418444) 2008 QM_{23}	29 August 2008	list^{[A]}
418532 Saruman	27 September 2008	list^{[C]}
(435797) 2008 VM_{4}	4 November 2008	list
(450981) 2008 SM_{84}	27 September 2008	list^{[B]}
(457752) 2009 HK_{68}	27 April 2009	list
458063 Gustavomuler	21 December 2009	list
(462765) 2010 EN_{12}	8 March 2010	list^{[B]}
(484791) 2009 DS	18 February 2009	list^{[A]}
(485065) 2010 EH_{21}	9 March 2010	list^{[A]}
(494998) 2010 JR_{31}	5 May 2010	list
(547164) 2010 EO_{12}	8 March 2010	list^{[B]}
(574201) 2010 EY_{11}	4 March 2010	list^{[B]}
(588450) 2008 CJ_{177}	14 February 2008	list^{[A]}
(589808) 2010 TH_{166}	13 October 2010	list
(590175) 2011 SE_{106}	23 September 2011	list
(590190) 2011 SN_{234}	30 September 2011	list^{[A]}
(591420) 2013 RA_{8}	14 January 2011	list
(591421) 2013 RU_{8}	3 January 2011	list
(596033) 2004 TA_{375}	23 October 2011	list^{[A]}
(598853) 2009 FE_{2}	17 March 2009	list^{[A]}
(599010) 2009 QU_{1}	17 August 2009	list
(614137) 2008 TH_{10}	8 October 2008	list
(621048) 2007 RT_{133}	13 September 2007	list^{[A]}

(627247) 2008 SL_{148}	27 September 2008	list^{[B]}
(632834) 2008 XD_{3}	5 December 2008	list
(633770) 2009 XM_{8}	14 December 2009	list
(648073) 2009 FX_{1}	17 March 2009	list^{[A]}
(684319) 2008 SJ_{83}	27 September 2008	list^{[B]}
(687004) 2011 HM_{6}	26 April 2011	list
(705619) 2009 FF_{14}	18 March 2009	list^{[A]}
(706882) 2010 VV_{20}	3 November 2010	list
724547 Süßenberger	11 February 2008	list^{[A]}
(730122) 2011 UA_{467}	23 October 2011	list^{[A]}
(739793) 2018 VN_{33}	1 December 2008	list
(744269) 2009 GC_{2}	13 April 2009	list^{[A]}
(745165) 2010 TY_{168}	2 October 2010	list
(745254) 2010 VM_{122}	6 November 2010	list
(763891) 2012 RA_{48}	13 September 2012	list
(770337) 2015 XG_{312}	8 November 2015	list
(780284) 2012 RP_{10}	12 September 2012	list
(780285) 2012 RZ_{10}	13 September 2012	list
(780781) 2012 WE_{38}	18 August 2012	list
(781243) 2013 EQ_{141}	13 February 2013	list
(781307) 2013 GD_{80}	13 April 2013	list
(786786) 2016 AC_{339}	8 January 2016	list
788501 Gabi	30 January 2017	list^{[D]}
(797360) 2011 EV_{88}	3 March 2011	list
(798478) 2012 RV_{24}	13 September 2012	list

810657 ESOC	22 March 2021	list^{[D]}
(811430) 2022 SN_{207}	16 February 2020	list^{[D]}
826631 Frascati	15 May 2021	list^{[E]}
Co-discovery made with:^{A} R. Kling^{B} S. Karge^{C} U. Zimmer^{D} D. Koschny^{E} M. Micheli

== Works ==
- Kleinplaneten-Entdeckungen in Deutschland (German). Epubli Verlag, Berlin 2016, ISBN 978-3-741-80915-6.
