= 216433 Milianleo =

Main-belt asteroid

- Animation of Milianleo from Tzec Maun

Discovery
- Discovered by: E. Schwab
- Discovery site: Tzec Maun Obs.
- Discovery date: 19 February 2009

Designations
- Named after: Milian Leo Schwab (discoverer's son)
- Alternative designations: 2009 DM_{3} · 2000 GE_{16}
- Minor planet category: main-belt · (middle); Aeolia

Orbital characteristics
- Epoch 23 March 2018 (JD 2458200.5)
- Uncertainty parameter 0
- Observation arc: 16.71 yr (6,105 d)
- Aphelion: 3.1023 AU
- Perihelion: 2.3810 AU
- Semi-major axis: 2.7417 AU
- Eccentricity: 0.1316
- Orbital period (sidereal): 4.54 yr (1,658 d)
- Mean anomaly: 326.86°
- Mean motion: 0° 13^{m} 1.56^{s} / day
- Inclination: 3.3499°
- Longitude of ascending node: 12.114°
- Argument of perihelion: 200.98°

Physical characteristics
- Dimensions: 1.6 km (est. at 0.17)
- Spectral type: X (est. from parent body)
- Absolute magnitude (H): 16.5

216433 Milianleo (provisional designation 2009 DM_{3}) is an Aeolia asteroid from the central region of the asteroid belt, approximately 1.6 kilometers (1 mile) in diameter. It was discovered 19 February 2009, by German amateur astronomer Erwin Schwab using a remote-controlled telescope at Tzec Maun Observatory (H10) in Mayhill, New Mexico, United States. The asteroid was named after the discoverer's son, Milian Leo Schwab.

== Orbit and classification ==
Milianleo is an attributed member of the Aeolia family (508), a small asteroid family that has fewer than 300 known members. The family is named after its parent body and largest member, 396 Aeolia. Milianleo orbits the Sun in the central main asteroid belt at a distance of 2.4–3.1 Astronomical units (AU), completing its orbit once every 4 years and 6 months (1,658 days; semi-major axis of 2.74 AU). It has an eccentricity of 0.13 and an inclination of 3° with respect to the ecliptic. It was first observed as 2000 GE_{16} at Lincoln Laboratory ETS in 2000, extending the body's observation arc by 9 years prior to its official discovery at Tzec Maun.

On 25 December 2098, Milianleo is expected to pass 4,449,642 kilometers from the asteroid 704 Interamnia. It will pass it at a relative velocity of 7.12 kilometers per second.

== Physical characteristics ==
Milianleo is likely an X-type asteroid, based on its membership to the Aeolia family. When using a generic magnitude-to-diameter conversion, it measures approximately 1.6 kilometers in diameter when using an absolute magnitude of 16.5 and an assumed visual geometric albedo of 0.17—these values are derived from the Aeolia family's parent body. As of 2018, no rotational lightcurve of Milianleo has been obtained from photometric observations. The body's rotation period, pole and shape remain unknown.

== Naming ==
This minor planet was named after Milian Leo Schwab, the first-born son of German amateur astronomer and discoverer Erwin Schwab. The naming approval citation was published by the Minor Planet Center on 4 October 2009 (M.P.C. 67220).

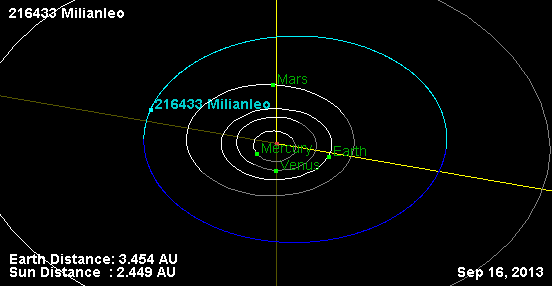
Orbit of Milianleo, close to its perihelion (Sept. 2013)

== See also ==
- Cloudcroft Observatory (V29), owned by the Tzec Maun Foundation
