= List of minor planets: 342001–343000 =

The following is a partial list of minor planets, running from minor-planet number 342001 through 343000, inclusive. The primary data for this and other partial lists is based on JPL's "Small-Body Orbital Elements" and data available from the Minor Planet Center. Critical list information is also provided by the MPC, unless otherwise specified from Lowell Observatory. A detailed description of the table's columns and additional sources are given on the main page including a complete list of every page in this series, and a statistical break-up on the dynamical classification of minor planets.

Also see the summary list of all named bodies in numerical and alphabetical order, and the corresponding naming citations for the number range of this particular list. New namings may only be added to this list after official publication, as the preannouncement of names is condemned by the Working Group for Small Bodies Nomenclature of the International Astronomical Union.

Near-Earth obj.	MBA (inner)	MBA (outer)	Centaur
Mars-crosser	MBA (middle)	Jupiter trojan	Trans-Neptunian obj.
Unclassified

== 342001–342100 ==
Designation			Discovery			Properties		Ref
Permanent	Provisional	Named after	Date	Site	Discoverer(s)	Category	Diam.	Ref
342001	2008 RJ_{34}	—	September 2, 2008	Kitt Peak	Spacewatch	·	1.5 km	MPC · JPL
342002	2008 RO_{34}	—	September 2, 2008	Kitt Peak	Spacewatch	NYS	1.1 km	MPC · JPL
342003	2008 RV_{34}	—	September 2, 2008	Kitt Peak	Spacewatch	·	1.6 km	MPC · JPL
342004	2008 RL_{35}	—	September 2, 2008	Kitt Peak	Spacewatch	·	1.1 km	MPC · JPL
342005	2008 RS_{35}	—	September 2, 2008	Kitt Peak	Spacewatch	·	1.6 km	MPC · JPL
342006	2008 RS_{36}	—	September 2, 2008	Kitt Peak	Spacewatch	·	1.5 km	MPC · JPL
342007	2008 RQ_{42}	—	September 2, 2008	Kitt Peak	Spacewatch	·	1.1 km	MPC · JPL
342008	2008 RY_{46}	—	September 2, 2008	Kitt Peak	Spacewatch	·	1.0 km	MPC · JPL
342009	2008 RJ_{47}	—	September 2, 2008	La Sagra	OAM	·	1.4 km	MPC · JPL
342010	2008 RX_{56}	—	September 3, 2008	Kitt Peak	Spacewatch	·	1.7 km	MPC · JPL
342011	2008 RK_{63}	—	September 4, 2008	Kitt Peak	Spacewatch	MAR	1.2 km	MPC · JPL
342012	2008 RL_{65}	—	September 4, 2008	Kitt Peak	Spacewatch	PHO	930 m	MPC · JPL
342013	2008 RX_{69}	—	September 5, 2008	Kitt Peak	Spacewatch	·	1.4 km	MPC · JPL
342014	2008 RM_{72}	—	September 6, 2008	Mount Lemmon	Mount Lemmon Survey	V	780 m	MPC · JPL
342015	2008 RQ_{74}	—	September 6, 2008	Catalina	CSS	NYS	1.2 km	MPC · JPL
342016	2008 RN_{78}	—	September 10, 2008	Siding Spring	SSS	BAR	2.0 km	MPC · JPL
342017 Ramonin	2008 RA_{80}	Ramonin	September 12, 2008	La Cañada	Lacruz, J.	NYS	1.4 km	MPC · JPL
342018	2008 RY_{80}	—	September 3, 2008	Kitt Peak	Spacewatch	·	1.9 km	MPC · JPL
342019	2008 RG_{84}	—	September 4, 2008	Kitt Peak	Spacewatch	·	1.2 km	MPC · JPL
342020	2008 RW_{88}	—	September 5, 2008	Kitt Peak	Spacewatch	·	1.3 km	MPC · JPL
342021	2008 RM_{93}	—	September 6, 2008	Kitt Peak	Spacewatch	NYS	1.3 km	MPC · JPL
342022	2008 RK_{95}	—	September 7, 2008	Catalina	CSS	·	1.5 km	MPC · JPL
342023	2008 RO_{96}	—	September 7, 2008	Mount Lemmon	Mount Lemmon Survey	·	1.5 km	MPC · JPL
342024	2008 RH_{98}	—	September 7, 2008	Skylive	Tozzi, F.	·	1.6 km	MPC · JPL
342025	2008 RM_{99}	—	September 2, 2008	Kitt Peak	Spacewatch	·	780 m	MPC · JPL
342026	2008 RY_{99}	—	September 2, 2008	Kitt Peak	Spacewatch	(5)	1.3 km	MPC · JPL
342027	2008 RV_{100}	—	September 5, 2008	Kitt Peak	Spacewatch	·	1.2 km	MPC · JPL
342028	2008 RX_{101}	—	September 2, 2008	Kitt Peak	Spacewatch	·	1.5 km	MPC · JPL
342029	2008 RH_{103}	—	September 5, 2008	Kitt Peak	Spacewatch	·	1.5 km	MPC · JPL
342030	2008 RE_{106}	—	September 6, 2008	Catalina	CSS	·	3.9 km	MPC · JPL
342031	2008 RA_{108}	—	September 9, 2008	Catalina	CSS	·	2.3 km	MPC · JPL
342032	2008 RT_{110}	—	September 3, 2008	Kitt Peak	Spacewatch	·	1.2 km	MPC · JPL
342033	2008 RW_{111}	—	September 4, 2008	Kitt Peak	Spacewatch	·	2.0 km	MPC · JPL
342034	2008 RF_{112}	—	September 4, 2008	Kitt Peak	Spacewatch	·	1.1 km	MPC · JPL
342035	2008 RR_{113}	—	September 6, 2008	Kitt Peak	Spacewatch	·	2.3 km	MPC · JPL
342036	2008 RB_{114}	—	September 6, 2008	Mount Lemmon	Mount Lemmon Survey	·	1.4 km	MPC · JPL
342037	2008 RT_{114}	—	September 6, 2008	Mount Lemmon	Mount Lemmon Survey	·	1.9 km	MPC · JPL
342038	2008 RG_{115}	—	September 6, 2008	Catalina	CSS	·	2.3 km	MPC · JPL
342039	2008 RP_{116}	—	September 7, 2008	Mount Lemmon	Mount Lemmon Survey	·	1.3 km	MPC · JPL
342040	2008 RT_{116}	—	September 7, 2008	Mount Lemmon	Mount Lemmon Survey	·	1.6 km	MPC · JPL
342041	2008 RJ_{117}	—	September 9, 2008	Catalina	CSS	EUN	1.6 km	MPC · JPL
342042	2008 RT_{118}	—	September 9, 2008	Mount Lemmon	Mount Lemmon Survey	·	1.5 km	MPC · JPL
342043	2008 RW_{119}	—	September 3, 2008	Kitt Peak	Spacewatch	EUN	1.5 km	MPC · JPL
342044	2008 RE_{120}	—	September 7, 2008	Catalina	CSS	·	1.9 km	MPC · JPL
342045	2008 RD_{121}	—	September 2, 2008	Kitt Peak	Spacewatch	·	910 m	MPC · JPL
342046	2008 RQ_{125}	—	August 22, 2004	Siding Spring	SSS	·	1.9 km	MPC · JPL
342047	2008 RG_{130}	—	September 7, 2008	Mount Lemmon	Mount Lemmon Survey	EUN	1.3 km	MPC · JPL
342048	2008 RX_{130}	—	September 4, 2008	Kitt Peak	Spacewatch	·	1.2 km	MPC · JPL
342049	2008 RN_{131}	—	March 10, 2007	Mount Lemmon	Mount Lemmon Survey	MAS	880 m	MPC · JPL
342050	2008 RY_{134}	—	September 2, 2008	Kitt Peak	Spacewatch	·	1.0 km	MPC · JPL
342051	2008 RL_{135}	—	September 3, 2008	Kitt Peak	Spacewatch	·	1.7 km	MPC · JPL
342052	2008 RD_{140}	—	September 8, 2008	Kitt Peak	Spacewatch	·	1.1 km	MPC · JPL
342053	2008 RO_{144}	—	September 3, 2008	Kitt Peak	Spacewatch	V	820 m	MPC · JPL
342054	2008 RQ_{145}	—	September 5, 2008	Kitt Peak	Spacewatch	NYS	1.0 km	MPC · JPL
342055	2008 RV_{146}	—	September 4, 2008	Socorro	LINEAR	·	2.5 km	MPC · JPL
342056	2008 RX_{146}	—	September 8, 2008	Kitt Peak	Spacewatch	·	1.7 km	MPC · JPL
342057	2008 SE_{2}	—	September 20, 2008	Goodricke-Pigott	R. A. Tucker	NYS	1.5 km	MPC · JPL
342058	2008 SM_{5}	—	September 22, 2008	Socorro	LINEAR	·	1.7 km	MPC · JPL
342059	2008 SM_{9}	—	September 22, 2008	Socorro	LINEAR	·	1.7 km	MPC · JPL
342060	2008 SW_{9}	—	July 10, 2004	Palomar	NEAT	·	1.6 km	MPC · JPL
342061	2008 ST_{13}	—	September 19, 2008	Kitt Peak	Spacewatch	NYS	840 m	MPC · JPL
342062	2008 SK_{17}	—	September 19, 2008	Kitt Peak	Spacewatch	·	1.4 km	MPC · JPL
342063	2008 SY_{19}	—	September 19, 2008	Kitt Peak	Spacewatch	(2076)	870 m	MPC · JPL
342064	2008 SW_{21}	—	September 19, 2008	Kitt Peak	Spacewatch	NYS	1.3 km	MPC · JPL
342065	2008 SG_{22}	—	June 20, 2004	Kitt Peak	Spacewatch	NYS	1.1 km	MPC · JPL
342066	2008 SJ_{22}	—	September 19, 2008	Kitt Peak	Spacewatch	·	1.2 km	MPC · JPL
342067	2008 SD_{24}	—	September 19, 2008	Kitt Peak	Spacewatch	fast	1.2 km	MPC · JPL
342068	2008 SL_{24}	—	September 19, 2008	Kitt Peak	Spacewatch	NYS	1.1 km	MPC · JPL
342069	2008 SE_{26}	—	September 19, 2008	Kitt Peak	Spacewatch	·	1.2 km	MPC · JPL
342070	2008 SK_{29}	—	September 19, 2008	Kitt Peak	Spacewatch	·	1.3 km	MPC · JPL
342071	2008 SU_{29}	—	September 19, 2008	Kitt Peak	Spacewatch	·	1.6 km	MPC · JPL
342072	2008 SM_{31}	—	September 20, 2008	Kitt Peak	Spacewatch	·	2.0 km	MPC · JPL
342073	2008 SN_{32}	—	September 20, 2008	Kitt Peak	Spacewatch	·	1.5 km	MPC · JPL
342074	2008 SX_{33}	—	September 20, 2008	Kitt Peak	Spacewatch	·	1.5 km	MPC · JPL
342075	2008 SY_{33}	—	September 20, 2008	Kitt Peak	Spacewatch	·	1.2 km	MPC · JPL
342076	2008 SG_{34}	—	September 20, 2008	Catalina	CSS	·	1.5 km	MPC · JPL
342077	2008 SH_{36}	—	September 20, 2008	Kitt Peak	Spacewatch	·	2.0 km	MPC · JPL
342078	2008 SY_{36}	—	September 20, 2008	Mount Lemmon	Mount Lemmon Survey	·	840 m	MPC · JPL
342079	2008 SG_{37}	—	September 20, 2008	Kitt Peak	Spacewatch	·	1.2 km	MPC · JPL
342080	2008 SA_{40}	—	September 20, 2008	Kitt Peak	Spacewatch	·	1.5 km	MPC · JPL
342081	2008 SU_{40}	—	September 20, 2008	Catalina	CSS	NYS	1.3 km	MPC · JPL
342082	2008 SY_{40}	—	September 20, 2008	Catalina	CSS	·	1.2 km	MPC · JPL
342083	2008 SR_{42}	—	September 20, 2008	Kitt Peak	Spacewatch	HNS	1.2 km	MPC · JPL
342084	2008 ST_{43}	—	September 20, 2008	Kitt Peak	Spacewatch	·	1.4 km	MPC · JPL
342085	2008 SC_{44}	—	September 20, 2008	Kitt Peak	Spacewatch	·	2.7 km	MPC · JPL
342086	2008 SJ_{45}	—	September 20, 2008	Kitt Peak	Spacewatch	·	1.5 km	MPC · JPL
342087	2008 SR_{45}	—	September 20, 2008	Kitt Peak	Spacewatch	·	1.5 km	MPC · JPL
342088	2008 SQ_{46}	—	September 20, 2008	Kitt Peak	Spacewatch	·	1.5 km	MPC · JPL
342089	2008 SK_{48}	—	September 20, 2008	Mount Lemmon	Mount Lemmon Survey	·	1.4 km	MPC · JPL
342090	2008 SE_{53}	—	September 20, 2008	Mount Lemmon	Mount Lemmon Survey	NYS	1.5 km	MPC · JPL
342091	2008 SO_{53}	—	September 20, 2008	Mount Lemmon	Mount Lemmon Survey	JUN	960 m	MPC · JPL
342092	2008 SL_{54}	—	September 20, 2008	Mount Lemmon	Mount Lemmon Survey	·	740 m	MPC · JPL
342093	2008 SL_{55}	—	September 20, 2008	Mount Lemmon	Mount Lemmon Survey	·	1.3 km	MPC · JPL
342094	2008 SD_{56}	—	September 20, 2008	Kitt Peak	Spacewatch	·	1.5 km	MPC · JPL
342095	2008 ST_{57}	—	September 20, 2008	Kitt Peak	Spacewatch	·	1.9 km	MPC · JPL
342096	2008 SZ_{57}	—	September 7, 2008	Mount Lemmon	Mount Lemmon Survey	(5)	1.6 km	MPC · JPL
342097	2008 SY_{60}	—	September 20, 2008	Catalina	CSS	·	1.3 km	MPC · JPL
342098	2008 SD_{61}	—	September 20, 2008	Catalina	CSS	·	1.3 km	MPC · JPL
342099	2008 SG_{62}	—	September 21, 2008	Kitt Peak	Spacewatch	·	1.4 km	MPC · JPL
342100	2008 SZ_{63}	—	September 21, 2008	Kitt Peak	Spacewatch	KON	2.5 km	MPC · JPL

== 342101–342200 ==
back to top

Designation			Discovery			Properties		Ref
Permanent	Provisional	Named after	Date	Site	Discoverer(s)	Category	Diam.	Ref
342101	2008 SW_{64}	—	September 21, 2008	Kitt Peak	Spacewatch	HYG	2.5 km	MPC · JPL
342102	2008 SK_{65}	—	September 6, 2008	Mount Lemmon	Mount Lemmon Survey	·	2.3 km	MPC · JPL
342103	2008 SQ_{65}	—	September 21, 2008	Mount Lemmon	Mount Lemmon Survey	·	2.9 km	MPC · JPL
342104	2008 SS_{66}	—	September 21, 2008	Catalina	CSS	·	1.4 km	MPC · JPL
342105	2008 SA_{68}	—	September 21, 2008	Catalina	CSS	(5)	1.4 km	MPC · JPL
342106	2008 SG_{68}	—	September 21, 2008	Mount Lemmon	Mount Lemmon Survey	EUN	1.7 km	MPC · JPL
342107	2008 SF_{70}	—	September 22, 2008	Mount Lemmon	Mount Lemmon Survey	V	890 m	MPC · JPL
342108	2008 SL_{74}	—	September 23, 2008	Catalina	CSS	·	2.1 km	MPC · JPL
342109	2008 SA_{80}	—	August 24, 2008	Kitt Peak	Spacewatch	(5)	1.3 km	MPC · JPL
342110	2008 SB_{87}	—	September 20, 2008	Kitt Peak	Spacewatch	·	1.3 km	MPC · JPL
342111	2008 SJ_{88}	—	September 20, 2008	Mount Lemmon	Mount Lemmon Survey	·	1.2 km	MPC · JPL
342112	2008 SO_{90}	—	September 21, 2008	Kitt Peak	Spacewatch	·	1.3 km	MPC · JPL
342113	2008 SU_{93}	—	September 21, 2008	Kitt Peak	Spacewatch	·	1.3 km	MPC · JPL
342114	2008 SF_{94}	—	September 21, 2008	Kitt Peak	Spacewatch	V	870 m	MPC · JPL
342115	2008 SH_{95}	—	September 6, 2008	Catalina	CSS	·	2.1 km	MPC · JPL
342116	2008 SD_{96}	—	September 21, 2008	Kitt Peak	Spacewatch	·	1.1 km	MPC · JPL
342117	2008 SP_{99}	—	September 21, 2008	Kitt Peak	Spacewatch	·	1.5 km	MPC · JPL
342118	2008 SA_{102}	—	September 21, 2008	Mount Lemmon	Mount Lemmon Survey	·	1.9 km	MPC · JPL
342119	2008 SD_{103}	—	September 21, 2008	Mount Lemmon	Mount Lemmon Survey	MAR	1.4 km	MPC · JPL
342120	2008 SU_{103}	—	September 21, 2008	Kitt Peak	Spacewatch	HOF	2.9 km	MPC · JPL
342121	2008 SJ_{104}	—	September 21, 2008	Kitt Peak	Spacewatch	·	1.6 km	MPC · JPL
342122	2008 SC_{105}	—	September 21, 2008	Kitt Peak	Spacewatch	·	1.6 km	MPC · JPL
342123	2008 SW_{111}	—	September 22, 2008	Mount Lemmon	Mount Lemmon Survey	·	1.2 km	MPC · JPL
342124	2008 SR_{116}	—	September 22, 2008	Mount Lemmon	Mount Lemmon Survey	·	1.2 km	MPC · JPL
342125	2008 SZ_{116}	—	September 22, 2008	Mount Lemmon	Mount Lemmon Survey	·	4.3 km	MPC · JPL
342126	2008 SQ_{117}	—	September 22, 2008	Mount Lemmon	Mount Lemmon Survey	·	1.3 km	MPC · JPL
342127	2008 SW_{118}	—	September 22, 2008	Mount Lemmon	Mount Lemmon Survey	(5)	990 m	MPC · JPL
342128	2008 SB_{119}	—	September 22, 2008	Mount Lemmon	Mount Lemmon Survey	·	1.2 km	MPC · JPL
342129	2008 SP_{120}	—	September 22, 2008	Mount Lemmon	Mount Lemmon Survey	(5)	1.4 km	MPC · JPL
342130	2008 SZ_{120}	—	September 22, 2008	Mount Lemmon	Mount Lemmon Survey	·	850 m	MPC · JPL
342131	2008 SS_{122}	—	September 22, 2008	Mount Lemmon	Mount Lemmon Survey	·	1.2 km	MPC · JPL
342132	2008 SK_{124}	—	September 22, 2008	Mount Lemmon	Mount Lemmon Survey	(5)	1.1 km	MPC · JPL
342133	2008 SY_{124}	—	September 22, 2008	Mount Lemmon	Mount Lemmon Survey	·	1.6 km	MPC · JPL
342134	2008 SB_{127}	—	September 22, 2008	Kitt Peak	Spacewatch	·	1.3 km	MPC · JPL
342135	2008 SN_{127}	—	September 22, 2008	Mount Lemmon	Mount Lemmon Survey	·	1.5 km	MPC · JPL
342136	2008 SO_{127}	—	September 22, 2008	Mount Lemmon	Mount Lemmon Survey	·	1.8 km	MPC · JPL
342137	2008 SX_{127}	—	September 22, 2008	Kitt Peak	Spacewatch	·	2.1 km	MPC · JPL
342138	2008 SY_{127}	—	September 22, 2008	Kitt Peak	Spacewatch	MAR	1.5 km	MPC · JPL
342139	2008 SO_{128}	—	September 22, 2008	Kitt Peak	Spacewatch	·	1.1 km	MPC · JPL
342140	2008 SH_{129}	—	September 22, 2008	Kitt Peak	Spacewatch	·	1.7 km	MPC · JPL
342141	2008 SN_{129}	—	September 22, 2008	Kitt Peak	Spacewatch	·	1.7 km	MPC · JPL
342142	2008 SP_{129}	—	September 22, 2008	Kitt Peak	Spacewatch	(5)	1.5 km	MPC · JPL
342143	2008 SQ_{129}	—	September 22, 2008	Kitt Peak	Spacewatch	·	1.3 km	MPC · JPL
342144	2008 SE_{130}	—	September 22, 2008	Kitt Peak	Spacewatch	·	1.9 km	MPC · JPL
342145	2008 SQ_{131}	—	September 22, 2008	Kitt Peak	Spacewatch	·	1.4 km	MPC · JPL
342146	2008 SV_{131}	—	September 22, 2008	Kitt Peak	Spacewatch	·	1.0 km	MPC · JPL
342147	2008 SM_{132}	—	September 22, 2008	Kitt Peak	Spacewatch	EUN	1.3 km	MPC · JPL
342148	2008 SX_{138}	—	September 23, 2008	Kitt Peak	Spacewatch	(5)	1.2 km	MPC · JPL
342149	2008 SN_{139}	—	September 23, 2008	Siding Spring	SSS	·	1.5 km	MPC · JPL
342150	2008 SW_{139}	—	September 24, 2008	Catalina	CSS	·	1.3 km	MPC · JPL
342151	2008 SO_{142}	—	September 24, 2008	Mount Lemmon	Mount Lemmon Survey	·	1.5 km	MPC · JPL
342152	2008 SR_{142}	—	September 24, 2008	Mount Lemmon	Mount Lemmon Survey	EUN	1.3 km	MPC · JPL
342153	2008 SS_{142}	—	September 24, 2008	Mount Lemmon	Mount Lemmon Survey	·	1.6 km	MPC · JPL
342154	2008 SD_{143}	—	September 24, 2008	Mount Lemmon	Mount Lemmon Survey	·	1.4 km	MPC · JPL
342155	2008 ST_{143}	—	September 24, 2008	Mount Lemmon	Mount Lemmon Survey	·	1.6 km	MPC · JPL
342156	2008 SZ_{143}	—	September 24, 2008	Mount Lemmon	Mount Lemmon Survey	·	1.6 km	MPC · JPL
342157	2008 SD_{144}	—	September 24, 2008	Mount Lemmon	Mount Lemmon Survey	·	2.4 km	MPC · JPL
342158	2008 SX_{147}	—	September 26, 2008	Bergisch Gladbach	W. Bickel	·	1.6 km	MPC · JPL
342159	2008 SC_{149}	—	September 29, 2008	Desert Moon	Stevens, B. L.	·	1.5 km	MPC · JPL
342160	2008 SZ_{149}	—	September 29, 2008	Dauban	Kugel, F.	·	1.2 km	MPC · JPL
342161	2008 SR_{152}	—	September 22, 2008	Socorro	LINEAR	NYS	1.2 km	MPC · JPL
342162	2008 SU_{154}	—	September 22, 2008	Socorro	LINEAR	·	1.1 km	MPC · JPL
342163	2008 SO_{156}	—	September 23, 2008	Socorro	LINEAR	·	1.4 km	MPC · JPL
342164	2008 SG_{159}	—	September 24, 2008	Socorro	LINEAR	NYS	1.2 km	MPC · JPL
342165	2008 SC_{161}	—	September 28, 2008	Socorro	LINEAR	·	1.5 km	MPC · JPL
342166	2008 SX_{162}	—	September 28, 2008	Socorro	LINEAR	NYS	1.6 km	MPC · JPL
342167	2008 SB_{165}	—	September 7, 2008	Mount Lemmon	Mount Lemmon Survey	·	1.3 km	MPC · JPL
342168	2008 SC_{165}	—	September 28, 2008	Socorro	LINEAR	·	2.2 km	MPC · JPL
342169	2008 SL_{165}	—	September 28, 2008	Socorro	LINEAR	·	1.2 km	MPC · JPL
342170	2008 SE_{177}	—	September 23, 2008	Mount Lemmon	Mount Lemmon Survey	·	1.6 km	MPC · JPL
342171	2008 SB_{178}	—	September 23, 2008	Kitt Peak	Spacewatch	(5)	1.3 km	MPC · JPL
342172	2008 SL_{180}	—	September 24, 2008	Kitt Peak	Spacewatch	·	1.2 km	MPC · JPL
342173	2008 SM_{180}	—	September 24, 2008	Kitt Peak	Spacewatch	·	1.0 km	MPC · JPL
342174	2008 SB_{182}	—	September 24, 2008	Mount Lemmon	Mount Lemmon Survey	·	3.3 km	MPC · JPL
342175	2008 SK_{182}	—	September 24, 2008	Kitt Peak	Spacewatch	·	1.3 km	MPC · JPL
342176	2008 SW_{182}	—	September 24, 2008	Mount Lemmon	Mount Lemmon Survey	·	1.1 km	MPC · JPL
342177	2008 SE_{183}	—	September 24, 2008	Mount Lemmon	Mount Lemmon Survey	·	1.4 km	MPC · JPL
342178	2008 SJ_{184}	—	September 24, 2008	Mount Lemmon	Mount Lemmon Survey	fast	1.2 km	MPC · JPL
342179	2008 SF_{185}	—	September 24, 2008	Kitt Peak	Spacewatch	·	1.8 km	MPC · JPL
342180	2008 SL_{185}	—	September 24, 2008	Kitt Peak	Spacewatch	·	3.2 km	MPC · JPL
342181	2008 SW_{185}	—	September 25, 2008	Kitt Peak	Spacewatch	·	2.7 km	MPC · JPL
342182	2008 SZ_{186}	—	September 25, 2008	Kitt Peak	Spacewatch	·	1.1 km	MPC · JPL
342183	2008 SX_{190}	—	September 25, 2008	Mount Lemmon	Mount Lemmon Survey	·	3.1 km	MPC · JPL
342184	2008 SO_{192}	—	September 25, 2008	Kitt Peak	Spacewatch	·	1.8 km	MPC · JPL
342185	2008 SD_{195}	—	September 25, 2008	Kitt Peak	Spacewatch	·	1.4 km	MPC · JPL
342186	2008 SN_{196}	—	September 25, 2008	Kitt Peak	Spacewatch	WIT	910 m	MPC · JPL
342187	2008 SM_{198}	—	September 25, 2008	Kitt Peak	Spacewatch	·	1.4 km	MPC · JPL
342188	2008 SH_{201}	—	September 26, 2008	Kitt Peak	Spacewatch	·	1.7 km	MPC · JPL
342189	2008 SR_{201}	—	September 6, 2008	Mount Lemmon	Mount Lemmon Survey	·	1.6 km	MPC · JPL
342190	2008 SV_{202}	—	September 26, 2008	Kitt Peak	Spacewatch	·	870 m	MPC · JPL
342191	2008 SX_{203}	—	September 26, 2008	Kitt Peak	Spacewatch	·	1.1 km	MPC · JPL
342192	2008 SL_{204}	—	September 26, 2008	Kitt Peak	Spacewatch	·	1.2 km	MPC · JPL
342193	2008 SQ_{205}	—	September 26, 2008	Kitt Peak	Spacewatch	·	1.5 km	MPC · JPL
342194	2008 SO_{208}	—	September 27, 2008	Mount Lemmon	Mount Lemmon Survey	·	2.5 km	MPC · JPL
342195	2008 SV_{208}	—	September 27, 2008	Mount Lemmon	Mount Lemmon Survey	·	1.3 km	MPC · JPL
342196	2008 SK_{211}	—	September 28, 2008	Mount Lemmon	Mount Lemmon Survey	EUN	1.2 km	MPC · JPL
342197	2008 SE_{212}	—	September 29, 2008	Mount Lemmon	Mount Lemmon Survey	·	3.3 km	MPC · JPL
342198	2008 SM_{213}	—	September 29, 2008	Kitt Peak	Spacewatch	NYS	1.2 km	MPC · JPL
342199	2008 SY_{216}	—	September 29, 2008	Mount Lemmon	Mount Lemmon Survey	·	1.5 km	MPC · JPL
342200	2008 SG_{218}	—	September 30, 2008	La Sagra	OAM	·	1.7 km	MPC · JPL

== 342201–342300 ==
back to top

Designation			Discovery			Properties		Ref
Permanent	Provisional	Named after	Date	Site	Discoverer(s)	Category	Diam.	Ref
342201	2008 SW_{218}	—	September 30, 2008	La Sagra	OAM	·	1.3 km	MPC · JPL
342202	2008 SE_{220}	—	September 30, 2008	La Sagra	OAM	·	1.0 km	MPC · JPL
342203	2008 SS_{220}	—	September 25, 2008	Kitt Peak	Spacewatch	NYS	1.2 km	MPC · JPL
342204 Oak Cliff	2008 SZ_{223}	Oak Cliff	September 26, 2008	Charleston	Astronomical Research Observatory	·	940 m	MPC · JPL
342205	2008 ST_{225}	—	September 26, 2008	Kitt Peak	Spacewatch	·	1.1 km	MPC · JPL
342206	2008 ST_{230}	—	September 28, 2008	Mount Lemmon	Mount Lemmon Survey	·	2.0 km	MPC · JPL
342207	2008 SX_{230}	—	September 28, 2008	Mount Lemmon	Mount Lemmon Survey	·	1.2 km	MPC · JPL
342208	2008 SK_{236}	—	September 29, 2008	Kitt Peak	Spacewatch	(5)	1.2 km	MPC · JPL
342209	2008 SL_{239}	—	March 13, 2007	Mount Lemmon	Mount Lemmon Survey	·	1.3 km	MPC · JPL
342210	2008 SD_{240}	—	September 29, 2008	Kitt Peak	Spacewatch	·	1.3 km	MPC · JPL
342211	2008 SG_{240}	—	September 29, 2008	Kitt Peak	Spacewatch	·	1.6 km	MPC · JPL
342212	2008 ST_{243}	—	September 30, 2008	Catalina	CSS	·	1.9 km	MPC · JPL
342213	2008 SD_{244}	—	September 24, 2008	Kitt Peak	Spacewatch	·	1.5 km	MPC · JPL
342214	2008 SG_{246}	—	September 30, 2008	La Sagra	OAM	·	1.5 km	MPC · JPL
342215	2008 SV_{246}	—	September 27, 2008	Catalina	CSS	HNS	1.7 km	MPC · JPL
342216	2008 SE_{248}	—	September 20, 2008	Kitt Peak	Spacewatch	·	1.4 km	MPC · JPL
342217	2008 SS_{248}	—	September 21, 2008	Kitt Peak	Spacewatch	·	1.9 km	MPC · JPL
342218	2008 SR_{249}	—	September 23, 2008	Kitt Peak	Spacewatch	·	1.3 km	MPC · JPL
342219	2008 SW_{253}	—	September 22, 2008	Kitt Peak	Spacewatch	·	1.4 km	MPC · JPL
342220	2008 SQ_{258}	—	September 22, 2008	Catalina	CSS	·	2.3 km	MPC · JPL
342221	2008 SF_{260}	—	September 23, 2008	Mount Lemmon	Mount Lemmon Survey	·	1.4 km	MPC · JPL
342222	2008 SH_{260}	—	September 23, 2008	Mount Lemmon	Mount Lemmon Survey	·	1.9 km	MPC · JPL
342223	2008 SK_{262}	—	September 24, 2008	Kitt Peak	Spacewatch	·	840 m	MPC · JPL
342224	2008 SX_{262}	—	September 24, 2008	Kitt Peak	Spacewatch	·	1.1 km	MPC · JPL
342225	2008 SN_{265}	—	September 28, 2008	Mount Lemmon	Mount Lemmon Survey	·	2.0 km	MPC · JPL
342226	2008 SE_{266}	—	September 29, 2008	Catalina	CSS	·	1.5 km	MPC · JPL
342227	2008 SW_{266}	—	September 21, 2008	Mount Lemmon	Mount Lemmon Survey	ADE	4.1 km	MPC · JPL
342228	2008 SB_{267}	—	September 22, 2008	Kitt Peak	Spacewatch	EUN	1.1 km	MPC · JPL
342229	2008 SO_{267}	—	September 23, 2008	Kitt Peak	Spacewatch	·	2.5 km	MPC · JPL
342230	2008 SO_{268}	—	September 27, 2008	Catalina	CSS	·	2.1 km	MPC · JPL
342231	2008 SP_{268}	—	September 27, 2008	Mount Lemmon	Mount Lemmon Survey	EUN	1.5 km	MPC · JPL
342232	2008 SC_{269}	—	September 30, 2008	Catalina	CSS	·	3.8 km	MPC · JPL
342233	2008 SW_{269}	—	September 23, 2008	Catalina	CSS	·	2.1 km	MPC · JPL
342234	2008 SR_{270}	—	September 25, 2008	Kitt Peak	Spacewatch	·	1.5 km	MPC · JPL
342235	2008 SE_{272}	—	September 30, 2008	Mount Lemmon	Mount Lemmon Survey	·	1.8 km	MPC · JPL
342236	2008 SU_{272}	—	September 24, 2008	Mount Lemmon	Mount Lemmon Survey	·	3.0 km	MPC · JPL
342237	2008 SZ_{272}	—	September 28, 2008	Mount Lemmon	Mount Lemmon Survey	AEO	1.2 km	MPC · JPL
342238	2008 SA_{273}	—	September 28, 2008	Mount Lemmon	Mount Lemmon Survey	·	1.3 km	MPC · JPL
342239	2008 SU_{274}	—	September 21, 2008	Mount Lemmon	Mount Lemmon Survey	·	1.3 km	MPC · JPL
342240	2008 SB_{275}	—	September 22, 2008	Kitt Peak	Spacewatch	·	1.7 km	MPC · JPL
342241	2008 SR_{276}	—	September 24, 2008	Kitt Peak	Spacewatch	·	1.2 km	MPC · JPL
342242	2008 SF_{279}	—	September 29, 2008	Kitt Peak	Spacewatch	·	1.5 km	MPC · JPL
342243	2008 SA_{282}	—	September 24, 2008	Kitt Peak	Spacewatch	·	3.8 km	MPC · JPL
342244	2008 SU_{282}	—	September 24, 2008	Kitt Peak	Spacewatch	·	1.9 km	MPC · JPL
342245	2008 SC_{283}	—	September 21, 2008	Mount Lemmon	Mount Lemmon Survey	·	2.9 km	MPC · JPL
342246	2008 SE_{283}	—	September 21, 2008	Mount Lemmon	Mount Lemmon Survey	·	1.8 km	MPC · JPL
342247	2008 ST_{284}	—	September 24, 2008	Kitt Peak	Spacewatch	·	2.1 km	MPC · JPL
342248	2008 SC_{285}	—	September 28, 2008	Mount Lemmon	Mount Lemmon Survey	·	1.3 km	MPC · JPL
342249	2008 SU_{285}	—	September 21, 2008	Kitt Peak	Spacewatch	·	1.2 km	MPC · JPL
342250	2008 SQ_{286}	—	September 22, 2008	Mount Lemmon	Mount Lemmon Survey	HNS	1.2 km	MPC · JPL
342251	2008 SU_{286}	—	September 23, 2008	Catalina	CSS	·	3.7 km	MPC · JPL
342252	2008 SV_{288}	—	September 24, 2008	Kitt Peak	Spacewatch	MAS	890 m	MPC · JPL
342253	2008 SR_{289}	—	September 26, 2008	Kitt Peak	Spacewatch	(5)	1.2 km	MPC · JPL
342254	2008 SZ_{295}	—	September 28, 2008	Catalina	CSS	EUN	1.9 km	MPC · JPL
342255	2008 SL_{296}	—	September 29, 2008	Catalina	CSS	(5)	1.3 km	MPC · JPL
342256	2008 SK_{298}	—	September 21, 2008	Kitt Peak	Spacewatch	·	1.3 km	MPC · JPL
342257	2008 SW_{298}	—	September 22, 2008	Mount Lemmon	Mount Lemmon Survey	·	1.4 km	MPC · JPL
342258	2008 SN_{300}	—	September 23, 2008	Kitt Peak	Spacewatch	·	2.9 km	MPC · JPL
342259	2008 SB_{301}	—	September 23, 2008	Catalina	CSS	·	1.2 km	MPC · JPL
342260	2008 SP_{301}	—	September 23, 2008	Kitt Peak	Spacewatch	·	1.4 km	MPC · JPL
342261	2008 SX_{302}	—	September 24, 2008	Catalina	CSS	·	2.8 km	MPC · JPL
342262	2008 SS_{305}	—	September 28, 2008	Socorro	LINEAR	·	1.3 km	MPC · JPL
342263	2008 SP_{306}	—	September 28, 2008	Mount Lemmon	Mount Lemmon Survey	·	1.3 km	MPC · JPL
342264	2008 SP_{307}	—	September 29, 2008	Catalina	CSS	·	1.6 km	MPC · JPL
342265	2008 SG_{308}	—	September 29, 2008	Mount Lemmon	Mount Lemmon Survey	WIT	1.1 km	MPC · JPL
342266	2008 SS_{309}	—	September 25, 2008	Mount Lemmon	Mount Lemmon Survey	fast	1.6 km	MPC · JPL
342267	2008 ST_{309}	—	September 27, 2008	Mount Lemmon	Mount Lemmon Survey	·	1.5 km	MPC · JPL
342268	2008 SV_{309}	—	September 27, 2008	Mount Lemmon	Mount Lemmon Survey	·	1.9 km	MPC · JPL
342269	2008 SX_{309}	—	September 29, 2008	Mount Lemmon	Mount Lemmon Survey	·	2.0 km	MPC · JPL
342270	2008 SC_{310}	—	September 29, 2008	Mount Lemmon	Mount Lemmon Survey	·	1.6 km	MPC · JPL
342271	2008 TJ_{5}	—	October 1, 2008	La Sagra	OAM	·	710 m	MPC · JPL
342272	2008 TN_{6}	—	October 1, 2008	Kitt Peak	Spacewatch	·	1.3 km	MPC · JPL
342273	2008 TY_{6}	—	October 3, 2008	La Sagra	OAM	·	2.4 km	MPC · JPL
342274	2008 TZ_{7}	—	October 4, 2008	La Sagra	OAM	·	1.6 km	MPC · JPL
342275	2008 TZ_{8}	—	September 29, 2008	Catalina	CSS	(5)	1.6 km	MPC · JPL
342276	2008 TW_{9}	—	October 5, 2008	Hibiscus	Teamo, N.	·	1.4 km	MPC · JPL
342277	2008 TE_{10}	—	October 8, 2008	Tzec Maun	E. Schwab	·	1.3 km	MPC · JPL
342278	2008 TN_{14}	—	May 5, 2003	Kitt Peak	Spacewatch	·	1.9 km	MPC · JPL
342279	2008 TF_{17}	—	October 1, 2008	Mount Lemmon	Mount Lemmon Survey	·	1.5 km	MPC · JPL
342280	2008 TO_{19}	—	October 1, 2008	Mount Lemmon	Mount Lemmon Survey	JUN	1.1 km	MPC · JPL
342281	2008 TV_{19}	—	September 22, 2008	Mount Lemmon	Mount Lemmon Survey	BRG	1.4 km	MPC · JPL
342282	2008 TO_{21}	—	October 1, 2008	Mount Lemmon	Mount Lemmon Survey	·	1.2 km	MPC · JPL
342283	2008 TS_{21}	—	October 1, 2008	Mount Lemmon	Mount Lemmon Survey	·	1.2 km	MPC · JPL
342284	2008 TN_{22}	—	October 1, 2008	Mount Lemmon	Mount Lemmon Survey	·	2.0 km	MPC · JPL
342285	2008 TV_{22}	—	October 1, 2008	Kitt Peak	Spacewatch	PAD	1.7 km	MPC · JPL
342286	2008 TT_{23}	—	March 20, 2007	Mount Lemmon	Mount Lemmon Survey	NYS	1.0 km	MPC · JPL
342287	2008 TX_{24}	—	October 2, 2008	Mount Lemmon	Mount Lemmon Survey	·	1.1 km	MPC · JPL
342288	2008 TT_{25}	—	September 7, 2008	Mount Lemmon	Mount Lemmon Survey	·	2.6 km	MPC · JPL
342289	2008 TH_{27}	—	November 17, 2000	Kitt Peak	Spacewatch	·	2.8 km	MPC · JPL
342290	2008 TS_{32}	—	September 20, 2008	Kitt Peak	Spacewatch	·	2.1 km	MPC · JPL
342291	2008 TL_{33}	—	October 1, 2008	Kitt Peak	Spacewatch	(5)	1.2 km	MPC · JPL
342292	2008 TR_{33}	—	October 1, 2008	Kitt Peak	Spacewatch	·	1.3 km	MPC · JPL
342293	2008 TZ_{35}	—	October 1, 2008	Mount Lemmon	Mount Lemmon Survey	fast	1.8 km	MPC · JPL
342294	2008 TP_{38}	—	October 1, 2008	Kitt Peak	Spacewatch	·	2.2 km	MPC · JPL
342295	2008 TX_{44}	—	October 1, 2008	Mount Lemmon	Mount Lemmon Survey	(5)	1.4 km	MPC · JPL
342296	2008 TK_{45}	—	September 6, 2008	Mount Lemmon	Mount Lemmon Survey	RAF	1.1 km	MPC · JPL
342297	2008 TL_{46}	—	October 1, 2008	Kitt Peak	Spacewatch	BAR	1.5 km	MPC · JPL
342298	2008 TU_{47}	—	October 1, 2008	Kitt Peak	Spacewatch	(5)	1.7 km	MPC · JPL
342299	2008 TC_{48}	—	October 1, 2008	Kitt Peak	Spacewatch	·	2.5 km	MPC · JPL
342300	2008 TD_{50}	—	October 2, 2008	Kitt Peak	Spacewatch	·	1.1 km	MPC · JPL

== 342301–342400 ==
back to top

Designation			Discovery			Properties		Ref
Permanent	Provisional	Named after	Date	Site	Discoverer(s)	Category	Diam.	Ref
342301	2008 TC_{53}	—	October 2, 2008	Kitt Peak	Spacewatch	·	2.7 km	MPC · JPL
342302	2008 TL_{53}	—	October 2, 2008	Mount Lemmon	Mount Lemmon Survey	·	820 m	MPC · JPL
342303	2008 TQ_{54}	—	October 2, 2008	Kitt Peak	Spacewatch	·	1.4 km	MPC · JPL
342304	2008 TU_{55}	—	October 2, 2008	Kitt Peak	Spacewatch	·	1.4 km	MPC · JPL
342305	2008 TM_{60}	—	October 2, 2008	Kitt Peak	Spacewatch	·	1.4 km	MPC · JPL
342306	2008 TN_{61}	—	October 2, 2008	Kitt Peak	Spacewatch	·	1.0 km	MPC · JPL
342307	2008 TX_{64}	—	October 2, 2008	Catalina	CSS	·	1.5 km	MPC · JPL
342308	2008 TG_{65}	—	September 3, 2008	Kitt Peak	Spacewatch	·	1.7 km	MPC · JPL
342309	2008 TZ_{65}	—	October 2, 2008	Catalina	CSS	·	1.1 km	MPC · JPL
342310	2008 TO_{66}	—	October 2, 2008	Kitt Peak	Spacewatch	·	1.2 km	MPC · JPL
342311	2008 TQ_{66}	—	October 2, 2008	Kitt Peak	Spacewatch	·	2.9 km	MPC · JPL
342312	2008 TT_{67}	—	October 2, 2008	Kitt Peak	Spacewatch	·	990 m	MPC · JPL
342313	2008 TF_{69}	—	September 23, 2008	Kitt Peak	Spacewatch	·	2.1 km	MPC · JPL
342314	2008 TU_{70}	—	October 2, 2008	Kitt Peak	Spacewatch	·	2.2 km	MPC · JPL
342315	2008 TS_{71}	—	October 2, 2008	Kitt Peak	Spacewatch	·	2.2 km	MPC · JPL
342316	2008 TF_{72}	—	October 2, 2008	Kitt Peak	Spacewatch	·	1.4 km	MPC · JPL
342317	2008 TL_{74}	—	October 2, 2008	Kitt Peak	Spacewatch	·	1.7 km	MPC · JPL
342318	2008 TQ_{77}	—	October 2, 2008	Mount Lemmon	Mount Lemmon Survey	·	990 m	MPC · JPL
342319	2008 TS_{79}	—	October 2, 2008	Kitt Peak	Spacewatch	·	1.7 km	MPC · JPL
342320	2008 TD_{80}	—	August 22, 2004	Siding Spring	SSS	NYS	1.3 km	MPC · JPL
342321	2008 TJ_{83}	—	October 3, 2008	Kitt Peak	Spacewatch	·	1.1 km	MPC · JPL
342322	2008 TJ_{84}	—	October 3, 2008	Kitt Peak	Spacewatch	·	1.9 km	MPC · JPL
342323	2008 TL_{89}	—	October 3, 2008	Kitt Peak	Spacewatch	·	1.5 km	MPC · JPL
342324	2008 TK_{92}	—	October 4, 2008	La Sagra	OAM	·	1.0 km	MPC · JPL
342325	2008 TQ_{94}	—	October 5, 2008	La Sagra	OAM	·	1.2 km	MPC · JPL
342326	2008 TT_{102}	—	October 6, 2008	Kitt Peak	Spacewatch	KON	3.4 km	MPC · JPL
342327	2008 TQ_{104}	—	October 6, 2008	Kitt Peak	Spacewatch	·	1.4 km	MPC · JPL
342328	2008 TL_{105}	—	October 6, 2008	Kitt Peak	Spacewatch	MAS	680 m	MPC · JPL
342329	2008 TS_{105}	—	October 6, 2008	Kitt Peak	Spacewatch	·	1.2 km	MPC · JPL
342330	2008 TC_{111}	—	October 6, 2008	Catalina	CSS	·	1.7 km	MPC · JPL
342331	2008 TJ_{111}	—	October 6, 2008	Catalina	CSS	(5)	1.4 km	MPC · JPL
342332	2008 TL_{111}	—	October 6, 2008	Catalina	CSS	ADE	4.0 km	MPC · JPL
342333	2008 TL_{114}	—	October 6, 2008	Kitt Peak	Spacewatch	V	1.2 km	MPC · JPL
342334	2008 TN_{114}	—	September 23, 2008	Kitt Peak	Spacewatch	(5)	1.6 km	MPC · JPL
342335	2008 TV_{117}	—	October 6, 2008	Mount Lemmon	Mount Lemmon Survey	·	1.7 km	MPC · JPL
342336	2008 TJ_{119}	—	October 7, 2008	Kitt Peak	Spacewatch	·	1.8 km	MPC · JPL
342337	2008 TS_{119}	—	October 7, 2008	Kitt Peak	Spacewatch	·	1.2 km	MPC · JPL
342338	2008 TE_{121}	—	October 7, 2008	Mount Lemmon	Mount Lemmon Survey	·	2.1 km	MPC · JPL
342339	2008 TN_{122}	—	October 7, 2008	Kitt Peak	Spacewatch	·	1.1 km	MPC · JPL
342340	2008 TH_{126}	—	September 6, 2008	Catalina	CSS	·	2.1 km	MPC · JPL
342341	2008 TD_{129}	—	October 8, 2008	Mount Lemmon	Mount Lemmon Survey	·	1.8 km	MPC · JPL
342342	2008 TM_{132}	—	October 8, 2008	Mount Lemmon	Mount Lemmon Survey	·	3.6 km	MPC · JPL
342343	2008 TV_{137}	—	October 8, 2008	Mount Lemmon	Mount Lemmon Survey	·	1.1 km	MPC · JPL
342344	2008 TD_{157}	—	September 22, 2008	Kitt Peak	Spacewatch	ADE	2.5 km	MPC · JPL
342345	2008 TZ_{157}	—	October 4, 2008	La Sagra	OAM	·	2.9 km	MPC · JPL
342346	2008 TT_{158}	—	October 10, 2008	Kitt Peak	Spacewatch	·	1.4 km	MPC · JPL
342347	2008 TS_{160}	—	October 2, 2008	Kitt Peak	Spacewatch	·	1.7 km	MPC · JPL
342348	2008 TN_{162}	—	October 4, 2008	La Sagra	OAM	(5)	1.2 km	MPC · JPL
342349	2008 TD_{166}	—	October 6, 2008	Mount Lemmon	Mount Lemmon Survey	·	1.5 km	MPC · JPL
342350	2008 TL_{168}	—	October 1, 2008	Mount Lemmon	Mount Lemmon Survey	·	1.6 km	MPC · JPL
342351	2008 TF_{169}	—	October 7, 2008	Catalina	CSS	MAR	1.2 km	MPC · JPL
342352	2008 TZ_{169}	—	October 8, 2008	Mount Lemmon	Mount Lemmon Survey	·	1.2 km	MPC · JPL
342353	2008 TG_{170}	—	October 8, 2008	Catalina	CSS	·	3.6 km	MPC · JPL
342354	2008 TU_{170}	—	October 9, 2008	Mount Lemmon	Mount Lemmon Survey	·	1.9 km	MPC · JPL
342355	2008 TD_{177}	—	October 9, 2008	Catalina	CSS	·	1.2 km	MPC · JPL
342356	2008 TB_{178}	—	October 24, 2005	Mauna Kea	A. Boattini	EUN	1.6 km	MPC · JPL
342357	2008 TY_{180}	—	October 8, 2008	Catalina	CSS	HYG	3.5 km	MPC · JPL
342358	2008 TW_{181}	—	October 1, 2008	Kitt Peak	Spacewatch	·	1.1 km	MPC · JPL
342359	2008 TB_{182}	—	October 1, 2008	Catalina	CSS	·	2.2 km	MPC · JPL
342360	2008 TF_{182}	—	October 1, 2008	Catalina	CSS	EUN	1.6 km	MPC · JPL
342361	2008 TW_{183}	—	October 2, 2008	Mount Lemmon	Mount Lemmon Survey	·	1.4 km	MPC · JPL
342362	2008 TH_{185}	—	October 6, 2008	Catalina	CSS	·	4.3 km	MPC · JPL
342363	2008 TK_{185}	—	October 6, 2008	Mount Lemmon	Mount Lemmon Survey	·	1.6 km	MPC · JPL
342364	2008 TR_{185}	—	October 6, 2008	Mount Lemmon	Mount Lemmon Survey	EUN	1.2 km	MPC · JPL
342365	2008 TX_{187}	—	October 9, 2008	Kitt Peak	Spacewatch	V	850 m	MPC · JPL
342366	2008 TZ_{188}	—	October 10, 2008	Mount Lemmon	Mount Lemmon Survey	·	2.5 km	MPC · JPL
342367	2008 TK_{189}	—	October 10, 2008	Mount Lemmon	Mount Lemmon Survey	·	2.5 km	MPC · JPL
342368	2008 UJ_{2}	—	October 20, 2008	Majdanak	Majdanak	·	1.5 km	MPC · JPL
342369	2008 UF_{4}	—	October 24, 2008	Sierra Stars	Tozzi, F.	·	1.6 km	MPC · JPL
342370	2008 UL_{4}	—	October 24, 2008	Sierra Stars	Tozzi, F.	·	1.7 km	MPC · JPL
342371	2008 UO_{5}	—	October 25, 2008	Great Shefford	Birtwhistle, P.	EUN	1.4 km	MPC · JPL
342372 Titia	2008 UQ_{5}	Titia	October 25, 2008	Dauban	Kugel, F.	·	1 km	MPC · JPL
342373	2008 UR_{9}	—	October 17, 2008	Kitt Peak	Spacewatch	·	1.7 km	MPC · JPL
342374	2008 UH_{13}	—	October 17, 2008	Kitt Peak	Spacewatch	·	910 m	MPC · JPL
342375	2008 UO_{14}	—	October 18, 2008	Kitt Peak	Spacewatch	·	1.5 km	MPC · JPL
342376	2008 UX_{15}	—	October 18, 2008	Kitt Peak	Spacewatch	·	1.2 km	MPC · JPL
342377	2008 UD_{19}	—	October 19, 2008	Kitt Peak	Spacewatch	·	1.1 km	MPC · JPL
342378	2008 UY_{26}	—	October 20, 2008	Kitt Peak	Spacewatch	·	1.5 km	MPC · JPL
342379	2008 UB_{29}	—	October 20, 2008	Kitt Peak	Spacewatch	·	1.4 km	MPC · JPL
342380	2008 UU_{29}	—	October 20, 2008	Kitt Peak	Spacewatch	·	1.9 km	MPC · JPL
342381	2008 UT_{30}	—	October 20, 2008	Kitt Peak	Spacewatch	·	1.2 km	MPC · JPL
342382	2008 UF_{31}	—	October 20, 2008	Kitt Peak	Spacewatch	·	1.3 km	MPC · JPL
342383	2008 UL_{32}	—	October 20, 2008	Kitt Peak	Spacewatch	WIT	1.2 km	MPC · JPL
342384	2008 UV_{32}	—	October 20, 2008	Kitt Peak	Spacewatch	·	1.8 km	MPC · JPL
342385	2008 UA_{34}	—	October 20, 2008	Kitt Peak	Spacewatch	·	1.9 km	MPC · JPL
342386	2008 UK_{34}	—	October 20, 2008	Kitt Peak	Spacewatch	·	1.4 km	MPC · JPL
342387	2008 UN_{34}	—	October 20, 2008	Kitt Peak	Spacewatch	·	3.5 km	MPC · JPL
342388	2008 UT_{34}	—	October 20, 2008	Kitt Peak	Spacewatch	·	2.2 km	MPC · JPL
342389	2008 UT_{38}	—	October 20, 2008	Kitt Peak	Spacewatch	·	2.0 km	MPC · JPL
342390	2008 UP_{40}	—	October 20, 2008	Kitt Peak	Spacewatch	·	1.1 km	MPC · JPL
342391	2008 UG_{41}	—	October 20, 2008	Kitt Peak	Spacewatch	·	1.5 km	MPC · JPL
342392	2008 UK_{41}	—	October 20, 2008	Kitt Peak	Spacewatch	·	1.1 km	MPC · JPL
342393	2008 UV_{42}	—	October 20, 2008	Kitt Peak	Spacewatch	·	1.3 km	MPC · JPL
342394	2008 UR_{48}	—	October 20, 2008	Kitt Peak	Spacewatch	·	3.6 km	MPC · JPL
342395	2008 UU_{48}	—	October 20, 2008	Kitt Peak	Spacewatch	·	1.6 km	MPC · JPL
342396	2008 UV_{50}	—	October 20, 2008	Mount Lemmon	Mount Lemmon Survey	·	810 m	MPC · JPL
342397	2008 UB_{51}	—	October 20, 2008	Mount Lemmon	Mount Lemmon Survey	·	1.3 km	MPC · JPL
342398	2008 UL_{52}	—	October 20, 2008	Kitt Peak	Spacewatch	MAR	1.5 km	MPC · JPL
342399	2008 US_{52}	—	October 20, 2008	Mount Lemmon	Mount Lemmon Survey	·	2.0 km	MPC · JPL
342400	2008 UO_{53}	—	September 9, 2008	Mount Lemmon	Mount Lemmon Survey	·	1.7 km	MPC · JPL

== 342401–342500 ==
back to top

Designation			Discovery			Properties		Ref
Permanent	Provisional	Named after	Date	Site	Discoverer(s)	Category	Diam.	Ref
342401	2008 UG_{54}	—	October 20, 2008	Kitt Peak	Spacewatch	·	2.9 km	MPC · JPL
342402	2008 UY_{54}	—	October 20, 2008	Lulin	LUSS	·	1.5 km	MPC · JPL
342403	2008 UD_{56}	—	October 21, 2008	Kitt Peak	Spacewatch	·	1.3 km	MPC · JPL
342404	2008 UQ_{56}	—	October 21, 2008	Mount Lemmon	Mount Lemmon Survey	·	1.2 km	MPC · JPL
342405	2008 UX_{56}	—	October 21, 2008	Mount Lemmon	Mount Lemmon Survey	NYS	1.0 km	MPC · JPL
342406	2008 UL_{57}	—	October 21, 2008	Kitt Peak	Spacewatch	·	2.1 km	MPC · JPL
342407	2008 UG_{58}	—	October 21, 2008	Kitt Peak	Spacewatch	·	1.2 km	MPC · JPL
342408	2008 UM_{58}	—	October 21, 2008	Mount Lemmon	Mount Lemmon Survey	·	1.7 km	MPC · JPL
342409	2008 UP_{58}	—	October 21, 2008	Mount Lemmon	Mount Lemmon Survey	KON	2.5 km	MPC · JPL
342410	2008 UD_{59}	—	October 21, 2008	Kitt Peak	Spacewatch	·	1.5 km	MPC · JPL
342411	2008 UJ_{65}	—	October 21, 2008	Kitt Peak	Spacewatch	·	1.9 km	MPC · JPL
342412	2008 UL_{65}	—	October 21, 2008	Kitt Peak	Spacewatch	·	1.8 km	MPC · JPL
342413	2008 UH_{66}	—	October 21, 2008	Kitt Peak	Spacewatch	(5)	1.3 km	MPC · JPL
342414	2008 UW_{66}	—	October 21, 2008	Kitt Peak	Spacewatch	·	2.2 km	MPC · JPL
342415	2008 UP_{67}	—	October 21, 2008	Kitt Peak	Spacewatch	·	3.6 km	MPC · JPL
342416	2008 UM_{70}	—	October 21, 2008	Kitt Peak	Spacewatch	·	1.8 km	MPC · JPL
342417	2008 UO_{70}	—	October 21, 2008	Kitt Peak	Spacewatch	·	2.1 km	MPC · JPL
342418	2008 UG_{71}	—	October 21, 2008	Mount Lemmon	Mount Lemmon Survey	WIT	1.1 km	MPC · JPL
342419	2008 UK_{72}	—	October 21, 2008	Mount Lemmon	Mount Lemmon Survey	·	1.3 km	MPC · JPL
342420	2008 UM_{72}	—	October 21, 2008	Mount Lemmon	Mount Lemmon Survey	(5)	2.0 km	MPC · JPL
342421	2008 UW_{73}	—	October 21, 2008	Kitt Peak	Spacewatch	·	2.3 km	MPC · JPL
342422	2008 US_{75}	—	October 21, 2008	Kitt Peak	Spacewatch	EUN	1.8 km	MPC · JPL
342423	2008 UG_{76}	—	October 21, 2008	Kitt Peak	Spacewatch	·	1.5 km	MPC · JPL
342424	2008 UB_{77}	—	October 21, 2008	Kitt Peak	Spacewatch	·	1.3 km	MPC · JPL
342425	2008 UP_{77}	—	October 21, 2008	Kitt Peak	Spacewatch	·	1.7 km	MPC · JPL
342426	2008 UA_{80}	—	September 23, 2008	Mount Lemmon	Mount Lemmon Survey	·	1.2 km	MPC · JPL
342427	2008 UM_{84}	—	October 23, 2008	Kitt Peak	Spacewatch	·	2.1 km	MPC · JPL
342428	2008 UG_{87}	—	October 23, 2008	Mount Lemmon	Mount Lemmon Survey	·	1.6 km	MPC · JPL
342429	2008 UP_{87}	—	October 23, 2008	Lulin	LUSS	·	1.3 km	MPC · JPL
342430	2008 UN_{89}	—	October 24, 2008	Mount Lemmon	Mount Lemmon Survey	·	1.2 km	MPC · JPL
342431 Hilo	2008 UQ_{90}	Hilo	October 25, 2008	Heppenheim	Starkenburg	·	1.9 km	MPC · JPL
342432	2008 UC_{91}	—	September 29, 2008	Catalina	CSS	·	2.8 km	MPC · JPL
342433	2008 UU_{92}	—	October 24, 2008	Socorro	LINEAR	·	3.6 km	MPC · JPL
342434	2008 UE_{93}	—	March 15, 2007	Mount Lemmon	Mount Lemmon Survey	·	2.1 km	MPC · JPL
342435	2008 UL_{93}	—	October 25, 2008	Socorro	LINEAR	·	2.7 km	MPC · JPL
342436	2008 UT_{93}	—	October 25, 2008	Socorro	LINEAR	·	2.0 km	MPC · JPL
342437	2008 UA_{94}	—	October 25, 2008	Socorro	LINEAR	·	1.7 km	MPC · JPL
342438	2008 UH_{94}	—	October 26, 2008	Socorro	LINEAR	JUN	1.2 km	MPC · JPL
342439	2008 UN_{94}	—	October 26, 2008	Socorro	LINEAR	·	1.8 km	MPC · JPL
342440	2008 UR_{94}	—	October 28, 2008	Kachina	Hobart, J.	·	1.6 km	MPC · JPL
342441	2008 UR_{95}	—	October 25, 2008	Kitt Peak	Spacewatch	·	1.7 km	MPC · JPL
342442	2008 UY_{95}	—	September 22, 2008	Kitt Peak	Spacewatch	·	1.7 km	MPC · JPL
342443	2008 UE_{98}	—	October 26, 2008	Socorro	LINEAR	·	2.0 km	MPC · JPL
342444	2008 UJ_{98}	—	October 26, 2008	Socorro	LINEAR	·	1.3 km	MPC · JPL
342445	2008 UR_{98}	—	October 26, 2008	Socorro	LINEAR	·	3.9 km	MPC · JPL
342446	2008 UU_{98}	—	October 25, 2008	Catalina	CSS	·	1.7 km	MPC · JPL
342447	2008 UA_{99}	—	October 28, 2008	Socorro	LINEAR	·	2.0 km	MPC · JPL
342448	2008 UA_{100}	—	October 27, 2008	Bisei SG Center	BATTeRS	·	1.5 km	MPC · JPL
342449	2008 UE_{101}	—	October 20, 2008	Kitt Peak	Spacewatch	·	1.3 km	MPC · JPL
342450	2008 UF_{110}	—	October 22, 2008	Kitt Peak	Spacewatch	·	1.7 km	MPC · JPL
342451	2008 US_{110}	—	October 22, 2008	Kitt Peak	Spacewatch	·	3.8 km	MPC · JPL
342452	2008 UW_{110}	—	October 22, 2008	Kitt Peak	Spacewatch	·	1.7 km	MPC · JPL
342453	2008 UA_{111}	—	October 22, 2008	Kitt Peak	Spacewatch	·	2.0 km	MPC · JPL
342454	2008 UG_{111}	—	October 22, 2008	Kitt Peak	Spacewatch	·	3.1 km	MPC · JPL
342455	2008 UA_{112}	—	October 22, 2008	Kitt Peak	Spacewatch	·	1.7 km	MPC · JPL
342456	2008 UP_{112}	—	October 22, 2008	Kitt Peak	Spacewatch	·	1.6 km	MPC · JPL
342457	2008 UQ_{112}	—	October 22, 2008	Kitt Peak	Spacewatch	·	1.3 km	MPC · JPL
342458	2008 UF_{115}	—	October 22, 2008	Kitt Peak	Spacewatch	·	2.3 km	MPC · JPL
342459	2008 UO_{115}	—	October 22, 2008	Kitt Peak	Spacewatch	·	1.1 km	MPC · JPL
342460	2008 UE_{116}	—	October 22, 2008	Kitt Peak	Spacewatch	·	1.4 km	MPC · JPL
342461	2008 UH_{119}	—	October 22, 2008	Kitt Peak	Spacewatch	·	2.1 km	MPC · JPL
342462	2008 UH_{121}	—	October 22, 2008	Kitt Peak	Spacewatch	·	2.2 km	MPC · JPL
342463	2008 UK_{122}	—	October 22, 2008	Kitt Peak	Spacewatch	·	2.5 km	MPC · JPL
342464	2008 UY_{122}	—	October 22, 2008	Kitt Peak	Spacewatch	(5)	1.7 km	MPC · JPL
342465	2008 UB_{123}	—	October 22, 2008	Kitt Peak	Spacewatch	(5)	2.5 km	MPC · JPL
342466	2008 UC_{123}	—	October 22, 2008	Kitt Peak	Spacewatch	·	2.0 km	MPC · JPL
342467	2008 UD_{124}	—	October 22, 2008	Kitt Peak	Spacewatch	·	2.1 km	MPC · JPL
342468	2008 UU_{124}	—	October 22, 2008	Kitt Peak	Spacewatch	·	2.1 km	MPC · JPL
342469	2008 UH_{125}	—	October 22, 2008	Kitt Peak	Spacewatch	EUN	1.5 km	MPC · JPL
342470	2008 UM_{126}	—	October 22, 2008	Kitt Peak	Spacewatch	·	2.4 km	MPC · JPL
342471	2008 UU_{127}	—	October 22, 2008	Kitt Peak	Spacewatch	·	1.8 km	MPC · JPL
342472	2008 UE_{129}	—	October 23, 2008	Kitt Peak	Spacewatch	·	1.6 km	MPC · JPL
342473	2008 UB_{137}	—	October 23, 2008	Kitt Peak	Spacewatch	·	1.1 km	MPC · JPL
342474	2008 UJ_{140}	—	October 23, 2008	Kitt Peak	Spacewatch	·	1.6 km	MPC · JPL
342475	2008 UB_{142}	—	October 23, 2008	Kitt Peak	Spacewatch	(5)	1.7 km	MPC · JPL
342476	2008 UA_{143}	—	October 2, 2008	Mount Lemmon	Mount Lemmon Survey	·	1.8 km	MPC · JPL
342477	2008 UR_{144}	—	October 23, 2008	Kitt Peak	Spacewatch	·	2.0 km	MPC · JPL
342478	2008 UD_{147}	—	October 23, 2008	Kitt Peak	Spacewatch	·	1.3 km	MPC · JPL
342479	2008 UG_{147}	—	October 23, 2008	Kitt Peak	Spacewatch	·	1.1 km	MPC · JPL
342480	2008 UL_{147}	—	October 23, 2008	Kitt Peak	Spacewatch	(5)	1.2 km	MPC · JPL
342481	2008 UG_{148}	—	October 23, 2008	Kitt Peak	Spacewatch	·	1.1 km	MPC · JPL
342482	2008 UX_{148}	—	October 23, 2008	Kitt Peak	Spacewatch	·	1.6 km	MPC · JPL
342483	2008 UP_{150}	—	October 23, 2008	Mount Lemmon	Mount Lemmon Survey	MAS	980 m	MPC · JPL
342484	2008 UG_{151}	—	October 23, 2008	Kitt Peak	Spacewatch	·	3.2 km	MPC · JPL
342485	2008 UN_{153}	—	October 23, 2008	Mount Lemmon	Mount Lemmon Survey	·	960 m	MPC · JPL
342486	2008 UC_{158}	—	October 23, 2008	Mount Lemmon	Mount Lemmon Survey	·	1.7 km	MPC · JPL
342487	2008 UP_{158}	—	October 23, 2008	Kitt Peak	Spacewatch	·	2.8 km	MPC · JPL
342488	2008 UW_{158}	—	October 23, 2008	Kitt Peak	Spacewatch	·	2.1 km	MPC · JPL
342489	2008 UV_{159}	—	October 23, 2008	Kitt Peak	Spacewatch	·	1.4 km	MPC · JPL
342490	2008 UM_{160}	—	October 23, 2008	Kitt Peak	Spacewatch	·	1.8 km	MPC · JPL
342491	2008 UK_{162}	—	January 5, 2006	Mount Lemmon	Mount Lemmon Survey	·	2.0 km	MPC · JPL
342492	2008 UM_{163}	—	October 24, 2008	Kitt Peak	Spacewatch	·	1.9 km	MPC · JPL
342493	2008 UB_{166}	—	October 24, 2008	Kitt Peak	Spacewatch	(5)	1.2 km	MPC · JPL
342494	2008 UW_{169}	—	October 24, 2008	Catalina	CSS	V	890 m	MPC · JPL
342495	2008 UD_{170}	—	October 24, 2008	Catalina	CSS	NEM	2.9 km	MPC · JPL
342496	2008 UQ_{171}	—	October 24, 2008	Kitt Peak	Spacewatch	·	2.1 km	MPC · JPL
342497	2008 UL_{172}	—	October 24, 2008	Kitt Peak	Spacewatch	·	1.8 km	MPC · JPL
342498	2008 UQ_{172}	—	October 24, 2008	Kitt Peak	Spacewatch	·	2.4 km	MPC · JPL
342499	2008 UD_{173}	—	October 24, 2008	Kitt Peak	Spacewatch	·	2.2 km	MPC · JPL
342500	2008 UX_{173}	—	May 26, 2007	Mount Lemmon	Mount Lemmon Survey	EUN	1.6 km	MPC · JPL

== 342501–342600 ==
back to top

Designation			Discovery			Properties		Ref
Permanent	Provisional	Named after	Date	Site	Discoverer(s)	Category	Diam.	Ref
342501	2008 UT_{174}	—	October 24, 2008	Catalina	CSS	·	2.4 km	MPC · JPL
342502	2008 UN_{176}	—	October 24, 2008	Mount Lemmon	Mount Lemmon Survey	·	1.0 km	MPC · JPL
342503	2008 UE_{181}	—	October 24, 2008	Mount Lemmon	Mount Lemmon Survey	·	2.5 km	MPC · JPL
342504	2008 UB_{183}	—	October 24, 2008	Mount Lemmon	Mount Lemmon Survey	·	1.9 km	MPC · JPL
342505	2008 UW_{183}	—	October 24, 2008	Mount Lemmon	Mount Lemmon Survey	·	2.1 km	MPC · JPL
342506	2008 UL_{185}	—	October 24, 2008	Kitt Peak	Spacewatch	·	2.9 km	MPC · JPL
342507	2008 UP_{185}	—	October 24, 2008	Kitt Peak	Spacewatch	·	1.7 km	MPC · JPL
342508	2008 UW_{185}	—	October 24, 2008	Kitt Peak	Spacewatch	(5)	1.1 km	MPC · JPL
342509	2008 UC_{186}	—	October 24, 2008	Mount Lemmon	Mount Lemmon Survey	·	1.0 km	MPC · JPL
342510	2008 UH_{186}	—	October 24, 2008	Kitt Peak	Spacewatch	·	1.8 km	MPC · JPL
342511	2008 UQ_{186}	—	October 24, 2008	Kitt Peak	Spacewatch	·	1.4 km	MPC · JPL
342512	2008 UE_{191}	—	October 25, 2008	Mount Lemmon	Mount Lemmon Survey	·	1.1 km	MPC · JPL
342513	2008 UF_{191}	—	October 25, 2008	Mount Lemmon	Mount Lemmon Survey	EUN	1.3 km	MPC · JPL
342514	2008 UE_{197}	—	October 27, 2008	Mount Lemmon	Mount Lemmon Survey	·	1.2 km	MPC · JPL
342515	2008 UL_{198}	—	October 26, 2008	Socorro	LINEAR	AEO	1.3 km	MPC · JPL
342516	2008 UA_{199}	—	October 27, 2008	Socorro	LINEAR	·	1.6 km	MPC · JPL
342517	2008 UM_{199}	—	October 31, 2008	Mount Lemmon	Mount Lemmon Survey	T_{j} (2.96)	5.9 km	MPC · JPL
342518	2008 UY_{199}	—	October 31, 2008	Sandlot	G. Hug	·	2.5 km	MPC · JPL
342519	2008 UA_{201}	—	October 28, 2008	Socorro	LINEAR	·	1.3 km	MPC · JPL
342520	2008 UW_{201}	—	October 31, 2008	Socorro	LINEAR	MAR	1.5 km	MPC · JPL
342521	2008 UA_{203}	—	October 28, 2008	Socorro	LINEAR	·	1.5 km	MPC · JPL
342522	2008 UX_{203}	—	October 28, 2008	Socorro	LINEAR	·	2.8 km	MPC · JPL
342523	2008 UK_{204}	—	October 26, 2008	Kitt Peak	Spacewatch	·	2.3 km	MPC · JPL
342524	2008 UQ_{204}	—	October 27, 2008	Socorro	LINEAR	EUN	2.1 km	MPC · JPL
342525	2008 UG_{205}	—	October 27, 2008	Catalina	CSS	·	3.3 km	MPC · JPL
342526	2008 UZ_{205}	—	October 22, 2008	Kitt Peak	Spacewatch	·	770 m	MPC · JPL
342527	2008 UH_{206}	—	October 22, 2008	Mount Lemmon	Mount Lemmon Survey	·	1.8 km	MPC · JPL
342528	2008 UW_{208}	—	October 23, 2008	Kitt Peak	Spacewatch	·	1.6 km	MPC · JPL
342529	2008 UH_{209}	—	October 23, 2008	Kitt Peak	Spacewatch	·	1.5 km	MPC · JPL
342530	2008 UK_{214}	—	October 24, 2008	Catalina	CSS	·	3.2 km	MPC · JPL
342531	2008 UB_{215}	—	October 10, 2008	Catalina	CSS	ADE	2.4 km	MPC · JPL
342532	2008 UF_{216}	—	October 24, 2008	Kitt Peak	Spacewatch	·	1.5 km	MPC · JPL
342533	2008 UU_{217}	—	October 25, 2008	Kitt Peak	Spacewatch	·	1.6 km	MPC · JPL
342534	2008 UE_{218}	—	October 25, 2008	Kitt Peak	Spacewatch	·	1.5 km	MPC · JPL
342535	2008 UO_{218}	—	October 25, 2008	Kitt Peak	Spacewatch	·	1.8 km	MPC · JPL
342536	2008 UQ_{218}	—	October 25, 2008	Kitt Peak	Spacewatch	·	1.6 km	MPC · JPL
342537	2008 UR_{219}	—	October 25, 2008	Kitt Peak	Spacewatch	(7744)	1.6 km	MPC · JPL
342538	2008 UT_{220}	—	October 25, 2008	Kitt Peak	Spacewatch	·	1.8 km	MPC · JPL
342539	2008 UR_{222}	—	October 25, 2008	Kitt Peak	Spacewatch	·	1.8 km	MPC · JPL
342540	2008 UA_{223}	—	October 25, 2008	Kitt Peak	Spacewatch	·	2.3 km	MPC · JPL
342541	2008 UC_{223}	—	October 25, 2008	Kitt Peak	Spacewatch	HOF	3.3 km	MPC · JPL
342542	2008 UY_{225}	—	October 25, 2008	Catalina	CSS	·	2.4 km	MPC · JPL
342543	2008 UC_{227}	—	October 25, 2008	Kitt Peak	Spacewatch	·	2.5 km	MPC · JPL
342544	2008 UD_{227}	—	October 25, 2008	Kitt Peak	Spacewatch	·	1.9 km	MPC · JPL
342545	2008 US_{227}	—	October 25, 2008	Kitt Peak	Spacewatch	WIT	1.2 km	MPC · JPL
342546	2008 UG_{228}	—	October 4, 1994	Kitt Peak	Spacewatch	·	2.4 km	MPC · JPL
342547	2008 UR_{230}	—	October 26, 2008	Kitt Peak	Spacewatch	HNS	1.6 km	MPC · JPL
342548	2008 US_{232}	—	December 25, 2005	Mount Lemmon	Mount Lemmon Survey	·	1.2 km	MPC · JPL
342549	2008 UM_{233}	—	October 26, 2008	Kitt Peak	Spacewatch	·	1.8 km	MPC · JPL
342550	2008 UO_{236}	—	October 26, 2008	Kitt Peak	Spacewatch	ADE	3.0 km	MPC · JPL
342551	2008 UA_{239}	—	October 26, 2008	Kitt Peak	Spacewatch	·	2.0 km	MPC · JPL
342552	2008 UV_{240}	—	October 26, 2008	Kitt Peak	Spacewatch	·	1.9 km	MPC · JPL
342553	2008 UV_{241}	—	October 26, 2008	Mount Lemmon	Mount Lemmon Survey	BRG	1.6 km	MPC · JPL
342554	2008 UN_{242}	—	October 26, 2008	Kitt Peak	Spacewatch	GEF	1.6 km	MPC · JPL
342555	2008 UO_{242}	—	October 26, 2008	Kitt Peak	Spacewatch	·	2.8 km	MPC · JPL
342556	2008 UT_{244}	—	October 26, 2008	Catalina	CSS	·	3.7 km	MPC · JPL
342557	2008 UN_{245}	—	October 26, 2008	Kitt Peak	Spacewatch	·	1.5 km	MPC · JPL
342558	2008 UW_{245}	—	October 26, 2008	Kitt Peak	Spacewatch	(5)	1.3 km	MPC · JPL
342559	2008 UT_{247}	—	October 26, 2008	Kitt Peak	Spacewatch	·	1.5 km	MPC · JPL
342560	2008 UG_{248}	—	October 26, 2008	Kitt Peak	Spacewatch	·	1.4 km	MPC · JPL
342561	2008 UL_{250}	—	October 27, 2008	Kitt Peak	Spacewatch	·	1.3 km	MPC · JPL
342562	2008 UB_{251}	—	October 27, 2008	Kitt Peak	Spacewatch	·	1.8 km	MPC · JPL
342563	2008 UG_{251}	—	October 27, 2008	Kitt Peak	Spacewatch	·	1.8 km	MPC · JPL
342564	2008 US_{251}	—	October 27, 2008	Kitt Peak	Spacewatch	·	2.1 km	MPC · JPL
342565	2008 UP_{252}	—	October 27, 2008	Kitt Peak	Spacewatch	·	1.0 km	MPC · JPL
342566	2008 UM_{254}	—	October 27, 2008	Kitt Peak	Spacewatch	(5)	1.4 km	MPC · JPL
342567	2008 UW_{254}	—	October 27, 2008	Kitt Peak	Spacewatch	·	1.7 km	MPC · JPL
342568	2008 UK_{255}	—	October 27, 2008	Kitt Peak	Spacewatch	·	1.9 km	MPC · JPL
342569	2008 UX_{255}	—	October 27, 2008	Kitt Peak	Spacewatch	·	2.0 km	MPC · JPL
342570	2008 UY_{257}	—	October 27, 2008	Kitt Peak	Spacewatch	·	3.5 km	MPC · JPL
342571	2008 UH_{259}	—	October 27, 2008	Kitt Peak	Spacewatch	·	1.3 km	MPC · JPL
342572	2008 UQ_{259}	—	October 27, 2008	Kitt Peak	Spacewatch	·	2.5 km	MPC · JPL
342573	2008 UN_{261}	—	October 27, 2008	Mount Lemmon	Mount Lemmon Survey	·	1.7 km	MPC · JPL
342574	2008 UB_{262}	—	October 27, 2008	Kitt Peak	Spacewatch	·	1.8 km	MPC · JPL
342575	2008 UC_{264}	—	October 28, 2008	Mount Lemmon	Mount Lemmon Survey	·	1.8 km	MPC · JPL
342576	2008 UP_{264}	—	October 28, 2008	Kitt Peak	Spacewatch	·	1.7 km	MPC · JPL
342577	2008 UV_{266}	—	October 28, 2008	Kitt Peak	Spacewatch	·	1.6 km	MPC · JPL
342578	2008 UW_{266}	—	October 28, 2008	Kitt Peak	Spacewatch	·	1.3 km	MPC · JPL
342579	2008 UR_{267}	—	October 28, 2008	Kitt Peak	Spacewatch	·	1.6 km	MPC · JPL
342580	2008 UK_{268}	—	October 28, 2008	Kitt Peak	Spacewatch	·	1.1 km	MPC · JPL
342581	2008 UG_{269}	—	October 28, 2008	Kitt Peak	Spacewatch	HNS	1.1 km	MPC · JPL
342582	2008 UP_{270}	—	October 28, 2008	Catalina	CSS	EUN	1.3 km	MPC · JPL
342583	2008 UF_{273}	—	October 28, 2008	Mount Lemmon	Mount Lemmon Survey	EUN	1.5 km	MPC · JPL
342584	2008 UG_{277}	—	October 28, 2008	Mount Lemmon	Mount Lemmon Survey	(5)	1.4 km	MPC · JPL
342585	2008 UO_{278}	—	October 28, 2008	Mount Lemmon	Mount Lemmon Survey	·	1.5 km	MPC · JPL
342586	2008 UQ_{279}	—	October 28, 2008	Mount Lemmon	Mount Lemmon Survey	KON	2.3 km	MPC · JPL
342587	2008 UU_{283}	—	September 24, 2008	Mount Lemmon	Mount Lemmon Survey	·	1.3 km	MPC · JPL
342588	2008 UQ_{288}	—	October 28, 2008	Mount Lemmon	Mount Lemmon Survey	·	890 m	MPC · JPL
342589	2008 UH_{289}	—	October 28, 2008	Kitt Peak	Spacewatch	·	2.0 km	MPC · JPL
342590	2008 UB_{292}	—	October 29, 2008	Kitt Peak	Spacewatch	PAD	1.7 km	MPC · JPL
342591	2008 UH_{300}	—	October 29, 2008	Kitt Peak	Spacewatch	·	2.2 km	MPC · JPL
342592	2008 UP_{300}	—	October 29, 2008	Catalina	CSS	·	2.1 km	MPC · JPL
342593	2008 UF_{301}	—	October 29, 2008	Kitt Peak	Spacewatch	·	1.6 km	MPC · JPL
342594	2008 UF_{302}	—	October 29, 2008	Kitt Peak	Spacewatch	·	1.4 km	MPC · JPL
342595	2008 UM_{302}	—	October 29, 2008	Kitt Peak	Spacewatch	·	1.3 km	MPC · JPL
342596	2008 UP_{302}	—	October 29, 2008	Kitt Peak	Spacewatch	·	890 m	MPC · JPL
342597	2008 UQ_{303}	—	October 29, 2008	Kitt Peak	Spacewatch	·	1.4 km	MPC · JPL
342598	2008 UE_{308}	—	October 30, 2008	Kitt Peak	Spacewatch	·	1.8 km	MPC · JPL
342599	2008 UT_{308}	—	October 30, 2008	Kitt Peak	Spacewatch	·	1.6 km	MPC · JPL
342600	2008 UW_{310}	—	October 30, 2008	Catalina	CSS	HNS	1.4 km	MPC · JPL

== 342601–342700 ==
back to top

Designation			Discovery			Properties		Ref
Permanent	Provisional	Named after	Date	Site	Discoverer(s)	Category	Diam.	Ref
342601	2008 UW_{313}	—	October 30, 2008	Mount Lemmon	Mount Lemmon Survey	·	2.0 km	MPC · JPL
342602	2008 UF_{315}	—	October 30, 2008	Kitt Peak	Spacewatch	·	1.8 km	MPC · JPL
342603	2008 UW_{315}	—	October 30, 2008	Kitt Peak	Spacewatch	·	2.0 km	MPC · JPL
342604	2008 UY_{320}	—	October 31, 2008	Mount Lemmon	Mount Lemmon Survey	·	2.1 km	MPC · JPL
342605	2008 UC_{321}	—	October 31, 2008	Mount Lemmon	Mount Lemmon Survey	RAF	950 m	MPC · JPL
342606	2008 UA_{322}	—	October 31, 2008	Mount Lemmon	Mount Lemmon Survey	·	1.7 km	MPC · JPL
342607	2008 UV_{322}	—	October 31, 2008	Mount Lemmon	Mount Lemmon Survey	·	1.4 km	MPC · JPL
342608	2008 UM_{323}	—	October 31, 2008	Catalina	CSS	·	2.6 km	MPC · JPL
342609	2008 UL_{324}	—	October 31, 2008	Kitt Peak	Spacewatch	(5)	1.6 km	MPC · JPL
342610	2008 UO_{325}	—	December 15, 2004	Socorro	LINEAR	·	2.5 km	MPC · JPL
342611	2008 UE_{327}	—	October 25, 2008	Siding Spring	SSS	·	2.9 km	MPC · JPL
342612	2008 UN_{327}	—	October 30, 2008	Catalina	CSS	HNS	1.8 km	MPC · JPL
342613	2008 UO_{331}	—	October 31, 2008	Catalina	CSS	·	2.2 km	MPC · JPL
342614	2008 UH_{335}	—	October 22, 2008	Kitt Peak	Spacewatch	·	2.4 km	MPC · JPL
342615	2008 UN_{336}	—	October 23, 2008	Kitt Peak	Spacewatch	THM	2.6 km	MPC · JPL
342616	2008 UJ_{338}	—	October 21, 2008	Kitt Peak	Spacewatch	·	2.0 km	MPC · JPL
342617	2008 UF_{339}	—	October 23, 2008	Kitt Peak	Spacewatch	·	2.5 km	MPC · JPL
342618	2008 UV_{339}	—	October 23, 2008	Kitt Peak	Spacewatch	·	1.5 km	MPC · JPL
342619	2008 UR_{340}	—	October 24, 2008	Catalina	CSS	·	1.7 km	MPC · JPL
342620 Beita	2008 UL_{341}	Beita	October 25, 2008	La Cañada	Lacruz, J.	·	3.1 km	MPC · JPL
342621	2008 UR_{341}	—	October 26, 2008	Kitt Peak	Spacewatch	·	1.2 km	MPC · JPL
342622	2008 UV_{341}	—	October 27, 2008	Kitt Peak	Spacewatch	·	1.9 km	MPC · JPL
342623	2008 UC_{342}	—	October 28, 2008	Kitt Peak	Spacewatch	·	2.4 km	MPC · JPL
342624	2008 UM_{342}	—	October 28, 2008	Mount Lemmon	Mount Lemmon Survey	·	1.3 km	MPC · JPL
342625	2008 UP_{342}	—	October 28, 2008	Mount Lemmon	Mount Lemmon Survey	·	2.0 km	MPC · JPL
342626	2008 UL_{343}	—	October 24, 2008	Catalina	CSS	·	3.1 km	MPC · JPL
342627	2008 UR_{343}	—	October 22, 2008	Kitt Peak	Spacewatch	·	1.9 km	MPC · JPL
342628	2008 UT_{344}	—	October 30, 2008	Kitt Peak	Spacewatch	·	2.1 km	MPC · JPL
342629	2008 UD_{346}	—	October 31, 2008	Mount Lemmon	Mount Lemmon Survey	GEF	1.3 km	MPC · JPL
342630	2008 UL_{346}	—	October 30, 2008	Mount Lemmon	Mount Lemmon Survey	EOS	2.6 km	MPC · JPL
342631	2008 UN_{346}	—	October 31, 2008	Mount Lemmon	Mount Lemmon Survey	·	3.5 km	MPC · JPL
342632	2008 UV_{349}	—	October 28, 2008	Mount Lemmon	Mount Lemmon Survey	·	1.1 km	MPC · JPL
342633	2008 UB_{352}	—	October 30, 2008	Catalina	CSS	·	2.3 km	MPC · JPL
342634	2008 UU_{352}	—	October 27, 2008	Mount Lemmon	Mount Lemmon Survey	·	1.8 km	MPC · JPL
342635	2008 UF_{353}	—	October 20, 2008	Kitt Peak	Spacewatch	·	1.8 km	MPC · JPL
342636	2008 UR_{353}	—	October 20, 2008	Kitt Peak	Spacewatch	WIT	890 m	MPC · JPL
342637	2008 UR_{354}	—	October 27, 2008	Mount Lemmon	Mount Lemmon Survey	·	1.8 km	MPC · JPL
342638	2008 UW_{355}	—	October 27, 2008	Kitt Peak	Spacewatch	·	3.0 km	MPC · JPL
342639	2008 UZ_{355}	—	October 23, 2008	Kitt Peak	Spacewatch	·	1.7 km	MPC · JPL
342640	2008 UD_{356}	—	October 20, 2008	Mount Lemmon	Mount Lemmon Survey	·	2.4 km	MPC · JPL
342641	2008 UM_{356}	—	October 23, 2008	Kitt Peak	Spacewatch	·	1.5 km	MPC · JPL
342642	2008 UA_{358}	—	October 25, 2008	Kitt Peak	Spacewatch	·	1.3 km	MPC · JPL
342643	2008 UG_{360}	—	October 21, 2008	Kitt Peak	Spacewatch	·	2.4 km	MPC · JPL
342644	2008 UZ_{363}	—	October 26, 2008	Catalina	CSS	·	2.5 km	MPC · JPL
342645	2008 UV_{364}	—	October 29, 2008	Catalina	CSS	·	2.8 km	MPC · JPL
342646	2008 UE_{367}	—	October 24, 2008	Socorro	LINEAR	(5)	1.6 km	MPC · JPL
342647	2008 UM_{368}	—	October 24, 2008	Catalina	CSS	·	2.6 km	MPC · JPL
342648	2008 UP_{369}	—	October 29, 2008	Socorro	LINEAR	·	2.4 km	MPC · JPL
342649	2008 UP_{370}	—	October 29, 2008	Kitt Peak	Spacewatch	·	2.4 km	MPC · JPL
342650	2008 VQ_{1}	—	November 2, 2008	Socorro	LINEAR	·	2.4 km	MPC · JPL
342651	2008 VR_{1}	—	November 2, 2008	Socorro	LINEAR	·	1.6 km	MPC · JPL
342652	2008 VW_{2}	—	November 2, 2008	Socorro	LINEAR	(5)	2.0 km	MPC · JPL
342653	2008 VG_{3}	—	October 6, 2008	La Sagra	OAM	MAR	1.8 km	MPC · JPL
342654	2008 VJ_{3}	—	September 29, 2008	Mount Lemmon	Mount Lemmon Survey	·	1.8 km	MPC · JPL
342655	2008 VO_{3}	—	November 3, 2008	Mount Lemmon	Mount Lemmon Survey	(10369)	1.7 km	MPC · JPL
342656	2008 VV_{3}	—	November 4, 2008	Vail-Jarnac	Jarnac	·	2.8 km	MPC · JPL
342657	2008 VW_{3}	—	November 4, 2008	Vail-Jarnac	Jarnac	·	1.7 km	MPC · JPL
342658	2008 VC_{4}	—	November 4, 2008	Bisei SG Center	BATTeRS	·	2.8 km	MPC · JPL
342659	2008 VP_{4}	—	November 4, 2008	Vail-Jarnac	Jarnac	·	2.2 km	MPC · JPL
342660	2008 VW_{4}	—	November 6, 2008	Nazaret	Muler, G.	ADE	3.6 km	MPC · JPL
342661	2008 VK_{6}	—	November 1, 2008	Kitt Peak	Spacewatch	·	2.1 km	MPC · JPL
342662	2008 VR_{10}	—	November 2, 2008	Mount Lemmon	Mount Lemmon Survey	·	1.7 km	MPC · JPL
342663	2008 VB_{12}	—	November 2, 2008	Mount Lemmon	Mount Lemmon Survey	·	2.5 km	MPC · JPL
342664	2008 VZ_{12}	—	November 3, 2008	Mount Lemmon	Mount Lemmon Survey	·	2.9 km	MPC · JPL
342665	2008 VB_{13}	—	November 3, 2008	Kitt Peak	Spacewatch	·	1.4 km	MPC · JPL
342666	2008 VC_{13}	—	November 6, 2008	Andrushivka	Andrushivka	·	1.8 km	MPC · JPL
342667	2008 VM_{13}	—	December 2, 2004	Catalina	CSS	·	1.7 km	MPC · JPL
342668	2008 VZ_{14}	—	November 7, 2008	Mount Lemmon	Mount Lemmon Survey	·	1.5 km	MPC · JPL
342669	2008 VP_{15}	—	November 1, 2008	Kitt Peak	Spacewatch	(29841)	1.7 km	MPC · JPL
342670	2008 VQ_{15}	—	November 1, 2008	Kitt Peak	Spacewatch	·	1.4 km	MPC · JPL
342671	2008 VQ_{16}	—	October 20, 2008	Kitt Peak	Spacewatch	·	1.3 km	MPC · JPL
342672	2008 VY_{25}	—	November 2, 2008	Kitt Peak	Spacewatch	·	1.4 km	MPC · JPL
342673	2008 VD_{31}	—	May 12, 2007	Kitt Peak	Spacewatch	·	1.5 km	MPC · JPL
342674	2008 VE_{35}	—	November 2, 2008	Mount Lemmon	Mount Lemmon Survey	HNS	1.4 km	MPC · JPL
342675	2008 VU_{35}	—	November 2, 2008	Kitt Peak	Spacewatch	·	2.8 km	MPC · JPL
342676	2008 VD_{36}	—	April 9, 2006	Kitt Peak	Spacewatch	KON	3.2 km	MPC · JPL
342677	2008 VC_{38}	—	November 2, 2008	Mount Lemmon	Mount Lemmon Survey	ADE	4.3 km	MPC · JPL
342678	2008 VV_{38}	—	November 2, 2008	Kitt Peak	Spacewatch	(5)	1.2 km	MPC · JPL
342679	2008 VL_{39}	—	November 2, 2008	Kitt Peak	Spacewatch	·	1.9 km	MPC · JPL
342680	2008 VN_{41}	—	November 3, 2008	Catalina	CSS	MAR	1.3 km	MPC · JPL
342681	2008 VT_{46}	—	November 3, 2008	Kitt Peak	Spacewatch	·	1.2 km	MPC · JPL
342682	2008 VT_{50}	—	November 4, 2008	Catalina	CSS	·	1.7 km	MPC · JPL
342683	2008 VW_{52}	—	November 6, 2008	Mount Lemmon	Mount Lemmon Survey	·	1.7 km	MPC · JPL
342684	2008 VB_{53}	—	November 6, 2008	Mount Lemmon	Mount Lemmon Survey	·	1.6 km	MPC · JPL
342685	2008 VL_{53}	—	November 6, 2008	Catalina	CSS	·	1.8 km	MPC · JPL
342686	2008 VX_{57}	—	November 6, 2008	Catalina	CSS	·	2.5 km	MPC · JPL
342687	2008 VL_{59}	—	September 22, 2008	Mount Lemmon	Mount Lemmon Survey	·	2.1 km	MPC · JPL
342688	2008 VZ_{60}	—	November 8, 2008	Mount Lemmon	Mount Lemmon Survey	·	2.6 km	MPC · JPL
342689	2008 VZ_{61}	—	October 2, 2008	Mount Lemmon	Mount Lemmon Survey	·	1.9 km	MPC · JPL
342690	2008 VK_{64}	—	November 10, 2008	La Sagra	OAM	EUN	1.9 km	MPC · JPL
342691	2008 VQ_{64}	—	November 10, 2008	La Sagra	OAM	·	1.8 km	MPC · JPL
342692	2008 VT_{66}	—	November 3, 2008	Kitt Peak	Spacewatch	·	1.6 km	MPC · JPL
342693	2008 VV_{67}	—	November 9, 2008	Kitt Peak	Spacewatch	·	2.0 km	MPC · JPL
342694	2008 VQ_{69}	—	November 8, 2008	Kitt Peak	Spacewatch	KOR	1.5 km	MPC · JPL
342695	2008 VD_{71}	—	November 9, 2008	Kitt Peak	Spacewatch	·	2.5 km	MPC · JPL
342696	2008 VR_{71}	—	November 2, 2008	Mount Lemmon	Mount Lemmon Survey	·	2.0 km	MPC · JPL
342697	2008 VS_{71}	—	November 6, 2008	Kitt Peak	Spacewatch	·	3.8 km	MPC · JPL
342698	2008 VB_{72}	—	November 3, 2008	Catalina	CSS	·	3.1 km	MPC · JPL
342699	2008 VO_{72}	—	November 7, 2008	Mount Lemmon	Mount Lemmon Survey	·	1.7 km	MPC · JPL
342700	2008 VH_{73}	—	November 3, 2008	Kitt Peak	Spacewatch	·	2.4 km	MPC · JPL

== 342701–342800 ==
back to top

Designation			Discovery			Properties		Ref
Permanent	Provisional	Named after	Date	Site	Discoverer(s)	Category	Diam.	Ref
342701	2008 VH_{75}	—	November 3, 2008	Catalina	CSS	MAR	1.6 km	MPC · JPL
342702	2008 VW_{77}	—	November 6, 2008	Mount Lemmon	Mount Lemmon Survey	EUN	2.2 km	MPC · JPL
342703	2008 VP_{78}	—	November 7, 2008	Mount Lemmon	Mount Lemmon Survey	·	1.8 km	MPC · JPL
342704	2008 VJ_{79}	—	November 2, 2008	Mount Lemmon	Mount Lemmon Survey	·	1.9 km	MPC · JPL
342705	2008 VS_{79}	—	September 18, 2003	Palomar	NEAT	·	2.3 km	MPC · JPL
342706	2008 VD_{80}	—	November 6, 2008	Kitt Peak	Spacewatch	·	4.0 km	MPC · JPL
342707	2008 VJ_{80}	—	November 1, 2008	Mount Lemmon	Mount Lemmon Survey	·	2.0 km	MPC · JPL
342708	2008 WG_{1}	—	November 17, 2008	Catalina	CSS	·	2.3 km	MPC · JPL
342709	2008 WW_{1}	—	November 18, 2008	Socorro	LINEAR	·	1.5 km	MPC · JPL
342710	2008 WR_{2}	—	November 18, 2008	Bisei SG Center	BATTeRS	·	2.0 km	MPC · JPL
342711	2008 WH_{3}	—	November 17, 2008	Kitt Peak	Spacewatch	·	1.4 km	MPC · JPL
342712	2008 WC_{10}	—	November 17, 2008	Kitt Peak	Spacewatch	·	2.1 km	MPC · JPL
342713	2008 WP_{12}	—	November 18, 2008	Kitt Peak	Spacewatch	·	1.3 km	MPC · JPL
342714	2008 WF_{13}	—	November 18, 2008	Socorro	LINEAR	·	1.8 km	MPC · JPL
342715	2008 WU_{13}	—	October 27, 2008	Kitt Peak	Spacewatch	HNS	1.5 km	MPC · JPL
342716	2008 WU_{14}	—	November 17, 2008	Kitt Peak	Spacewatch	·	1.1 km	MPC · JPL
342717	2008 WB_{15}	—	November 17, 2008	Kitt Peak	Spacewatch	·	870 m	MPC · JPL
342718	2008 WE_{16}	—	November 17, 2008	Kitt Peak	Spacewatch	·	1.7 km	MPC · JPL
342719	2008 WW_{16}	—	November 17, 2008	Kitt Peak	Spacewatch	·	2.3 km	MPC · JPL
342720	2008 WQ_{21}	—	November 17, 2008	Kitt Peak	Spacewatch	·	1.6 km	MPC · JPL
342721	2008 WC_{23}	—	November 18, 2008	Catalina	CSS	·	2.8 km	MPC · JPL
342722	2008 WJ_{23}	—	November 18, 2008	Catalina	CSS	·	1.9 km	MPC · JPL
342723	2008 WL_{23}	—	November 18, 2008	Catalina	CSS	(5)	1.2 km	MPC · JPL
342724	2008 WA_{24}	—	November 18, 2008	Catalina	CSS	·	1.4 km	MPC · JPL
342725	2008 WL_{25}	—	November 18, 2008	Kitt Peak	Spacewatch	·	2.4 km	MPC · JPL
342726	2008 WQ_{25}	—	October 23, 2008	Kitt Peak	Spacewatch	·	1.7 km	MPC · JPL
342727	2008 WP_{32}	—	November 20, 2008	Mayhill	Lowe, A.	·	1.6 km	MPC · JPL
342728	2008 WD_{34}	—	November 17, 2008	Kitt Peak	Spacewatch	AEO	1.1 km	MPC · JPL
342729	2008 WG_{34}	—	November 17, 2008	Kitt Peak	Spacewatch	·	1.4 km	MPC · JPL
342730	2008 WB_{39}	—	October 28, 2008	Kitt Peak	Spacewatch	·	1.6 km	MPC · JPL
342731	2008 WD_{40}	—	November 17, 2008	Kitt Peak	Spacewatch	HOF	2.7 km	MPC · JPL
342732	2008 WW_{41}	—	November 17, 2008	Kitt Peak	Spacewatch	·	2.2 km	MPC · JPL
342733	2008 WO_{42}	—	November 17, 2008	Kitt Peak	Spacewatch	·	1.6 km	MPC · JPL
342734	2008 WF_{43}	—	November 17, 2008	Kitt Peak	Spacewatch	·	1.4 km	MPC · JPL
342735	2008 WZ_{44}	—	November 17, 2008	Kitt Peak	Spacewatch	·	1.9 km	MPC · JPL
342736	2008 WK_{46}	—	November 17, 2008	Kitt Peak	Spacewatch	·	2.0 km	MPC · JPL
342737	2008 WV_{48}	—	November 18, 2008	Catalina	CSS	·	1.5 km	MPC · JPL
342738	2008 WB_{49}	—	November 18, 2008	Catalina	CSS	(5)	1.3 km	MPC · JPL
342739	2008 WS_{49}	—	March 25, 2006	Kitt Peak	Spacewatch	·	2.0 km	MPC · JPL
342740	2008 WM_{51}	—	November 18, 2008	Kitt Peak	Spacewatch	·	1.3 km	MPC · JPL
342741	2008 WK_{54}	—	November 19, 2008	Kitt Peak	Spacewatch	·	1.6 km	MPC · JPL
342742	2008 WU_{54}	—	November 19, 2008	Mount Lemmon	Mount Lemmon Survey	·	2.7 km	MPC · JPL
342743	2008 WT_{60}	—	November 19, 2008	Socorro	LINEAR	·	1.3 km	MPC · JPL
342744	2008 WD_{61}	—	November 23, 2008	Socorro	LINEAR	·	2.7 km	MPC · JPL
342745	2008 WT_{61}	—	November 22, 2008	La Sagra	OAM	(5)	1.1 km	MPC · JPL
342746	2008 WV_{62}	—	November 21, 2008	Bisei SG Center	BATTeRS	·	1.7 km	MPC · JPL
342747	2008 WK_{63}	—	November 20, 2008	Socorro	LINEAR	EUN	2.0 km	MPC · JPL
342748	2008 WU_{65}	—	September 25, 2008	Mount Lemmon	Mount Lemmon Survey	·	2.2 km	MPC · JPL
342749	2008 WU_{66}	—	November 18, 2008	Kitt Peak	Spacewatch	·	2.2 km	MPC · JPL
342750	2008 WN_{67}	—	November 18, 2008	Kitt Peak	Spacewatch	·	1.6 km	MPC · JPL
342751	2008 WW_{67}	—	December 10, 2004	Kitt Peak	Spacewatch	·	1.1 km	MPC · JPL
342752	2008 WY_{68}	—	November 18, 2008	Kitt Peak	Spacewatch	(5)	1.3 km	MPC · JPL
342753	2008 WU_{73}	—	November 19, 2008	Mount Lemmon	Mount Lemmon Survey	·	4.2 km	MPC · JPL
342754	2008 WJ_{75}	—	September 23, 2008	Mount Lemmon	Mount Lemmon Survey	·	2.8 km	MPC · JPL
342755	2008 WG_{78}	—	November 20, 2008	Kitt Peak	Spacewatch	·	1.6 km	MPC · JPL
342756	2008 WK_{79}	—	November 20, 2008	Kitt Peak	Spacewatch	·	2.1 km	MPC · JPL
342757	2008 WX_{81}	—	November 20, 2008	Kitt Peak	Spacewatch	·	1.7 km	MPC · JPL
342758	2008 WF_{83}	—	November 20, 2008	Kitt Peak	Spacewatch	(5)	1.2 km	MPC · JPL
342759	2008 WD_{85}	—	November 20, 2008	Kitt Peak	Spacewatch	·	2.3 km	MPC · JPL
342760	2008 WV_{88}	—	November 21, 2008	Mount Lemmon	Mount Lemmon Survey	·	2.3 km	MPC · JPL
342761	2008 WL_{92}	—	November 24, 2008	Dauban	Kugel, F.	·	1.8 km	MPC · JPL
342762	2008 WW_{94}	—	November 26, 2008	Farra d'Isonzo	Farra d'Isonzo	·	2.2 km	MPC · JPL
342763	2008 WD_{95}	—	November 21, 2008	Cerro Burek	Burek, Cerro	·	2.1 km	MPC · JPL
342764 Alantitus	2008 WL_{95}	Alantitus	October 26, 2008	Mount Lemmon	Mount Lemmon Survey	·	1.6 km	MPC · JPL
342765	2008 WB_{97}	—	November 28, 2008	Piszkéstető	K. Sárneczky, Orgel, C.	·	1.4 km	MPC · JPL
342766	2008 WC_{97}	—	November 17, 2008	Catalina	CSS	·	3.6 km	MPC · JPL
342767	2008 WU_{97}	—	November 19, 2008	Catalina	CSS	·	1.3 km	MPC · JPL
342768	2008 WL_{98}	—	November 24, 2008	Mount Lemmon	Mount Lemmon Survey	·	2.3 km	MPC · JPL
342769	2008 WS_{98}	—	November 23, 2008	La Sagra	OAM	·	2.1 km	MPC · JPL
342770	2008 WV_{98}	—	November 23, 2008	La Sagra	OAM	·	2.5 km	MPC · JPL
342771	2008 WH_{101}	—	November 26, 2008	La Sagra	OAM	·	2.8 km	MPC · JPL
342772	2008 WK_{101}	—	November 27, 2008	Charleston	Astronomical Research Observatory	·	2.3 km	MPC · JPL
342773	2008 WM_{101}	—	November 27, 2008	Črni Vrh	J. Vales, B. Mikuž	·	2.4 km	MPC · JPL
342774	2008 WP_{101}	—	November 30, 2008	Socorro	LINEAR	·	1.4 km	MPC · JPL
342775	2008 WO_{102}	—	November 19, 2008	Catalina	CSS	·	1.8 km	MPC · JPL
342776	2008 WN_{103}	—	November 30, 2008	Kitt Peak	Spacewatch	·	1.4 km	MPC · JPL
342777	2008 WH_{106}	—	November 30, 2008	Kitt Peak	Spacewatch	·	1.9 km	MPC · JPL
342778	2008 WN_{107}	—	October 21, 2008	Mount Lemmon	Mount Lemmon Survey	·	2.9 km	MPC · JPL
342779	2008 WG_{108}	—	November 30, 2008	Catalina	CSS	·	1.7 km	MPC · JPL
342780	2008 WN_{109}	—	November 30, 2008	Kitt Peak	Spacewatch	HOF	2.3 km	MPC · JPL
342781	2008 WO_{109}	—	November 30, 2008	Kitt Peak	Spacewatch	·	1.4 km	MPC · JPL
342782	2008 WT_{110}	—	December 3, 1999	Kitt Peak	Spacewatch	·	2.1 km	MPC · JPL
342783	2008 WE_{113}	—	November 30, 2008	Kitt Peak	Spacewatch	·	1.4 km	MPC · JPL
342784	2008 WW_{113}	—	November 30, 2008	Kitt Peak	Spacewatch	·	2.4 km	MPC · JPL
342785	2008 WG_{114}	—	November 30, 2008	Kitt Peak	Spacewatch	·	1.4 km	MPC · JPL
342786	2008 WR_{117}	—	October 30, 2008	Kitt Peak	Spacewatch	·	1.7 km	MPC · JPL
342787	2008 WA_{120}	—	September 22, 2003	Palomar	NEAT	·	3.0 km	MPC · JPL
342788	2008 WL_{120}	—	November 30, 2008	Kitt Peak	Spacewatch	·	2.6 km	MPC · JPL
342789	2008 WH_{122}	—	November 30, 2008	Catalina	CSS	BRG	2.2 km	MPC · JPL
342790	2008 WW_{122}	—	November 30, 2008	Kitt Peak	Spacewatch	·	2.5 km	MPC · JPL
342791	2008 WJ_{125}	—	November 24, 2008	Kitt Peak	Spacewatch	·	3.5 km	MPC · JPL
342792	2008 WT_{126}	—	November 24, 2008	Mount Lemmon	Mount Lemmon Survey	·	2.6 km	MPC · JPL
342793	2008 WR_{129}	—	November 17, 2008	Kitt Peak	Spacewatch	WIT	1.1 km	MPC · JPL
342794	2008 WA_{134}	—	November 19, 2008	Mount Lemmon	Mount Lemmon Survey	EUN	1.5 km	MPC · JPL
342795	2008 WJ_{134}	—	November 21, 2008	Mount Lemmon	Mount Lemmon Survey	·	2.6 km	MPC · JPL
342796	2008 WD_{135}	—	November 18, 2008	Kitt Peak	Spacewatch	·	2.1 km	MPC · JPL
342797	2008 WU_{135}	—	November 19, 2008	Kitt Peak	Spacewatch	·	1.4 km	MPC · JPL
342798	2008 WW_{135}	—	November 19, 2008	Kitt Peak	Spacewatch	·	2.9 km	MPC · JPL
342799	2008 WV_{136}	—	November 21, 2008	Kitt Peak	Spacewatch	·	1.8 km	MPC · JPL
342800	2008 WO_{137}	—	November 22, 2008	Kitt Peak	Spacewatch	·	4.0 km	MPC · JPL

== 342801–342900 ==
back to top

Designation			Discovery			Properties		Ref
Permanent	Provisional	Named after	Date	Site	Discoverer(s)	Category	Diam.	Ref
342801	2008 WH_{139}	—	November 30, 2008	Socorro	LINEAR	·	2.7 km	MPC · JPL
342802	2008 WQ_{139}	—	November 23, 2008	Mount Lemmon	Mount Lemmon Survey	·	4.2 km	MPC · JPL
342803	2008 WH_{140}	—	November 17, 2008	Catalina	CSS	MAR	1.8 km	MPC · JPL
342804	2008 WX_{140}	—	March 9, 2002	Kitt Peak	Spacewatch	·	1.8 km	MPC · JPL
342805	2008 WO_{141}	—	December 12, 2004	Catalina	CSS	EUN	2.0 km	MPC · JPL
342806	2008 WU_{141}	—	October 26, 2003	Kitt Peak	Spacewatch	·	2.0 km	MPC · JPL
342807	2008 XO_{1}	—	December 2, 2008	Bisei SG Center	BATTeRS	·	3.0 km	MPC · JPL
342808	2008 XV_{1}	—	December 4, 2008	Mayhill	Lowe, A.	·	3.1 km	MPC · JPL
342809	2008 XK_{3}	—	December 4, 2008	Vail-Jarnac	Jarnac	·	2.4 km	MPC · JPL
342810	2008 XQ_{3}	—	December 2, 2008	Socorro	LINEAR	·	1.5 km	MPC · JPL
342811	2008 XW_{3}	—	December 2, 2008	Socorro	LINEAR	·	2.5 km	MPC · JPL
342812	2008 XR_{4}	—	December 15, 2004	Socorro	LINEAR	·	1.5 km	MPC · JPL
342813	2008 XE_{6}	—	December 4, 2008	Socorro	LINEAR	·	3.6 km	MPC · JPL
342814	2008 XR_{6}	—	December 4, 2008	Socorro	LINEAR	·	2.6 km	MPC · JPL
342815	2008 XU_{6}	—	December 3, 2008	Marly	P. Kocher	·	1.7 km	MPC · JPL
342816	2008 XV_{6}	—	December 6, 2008	Bisei SG Center	BATTeRS	·	1.7 km	MPC · JPL
342817	2008 XQ_{8}	—	December 1, 2008	Mount Lemmon	Mount Lemmon Survey	·	1.7 km	MPC · JPL
342818	2008 XD_{14}	—	December 1, 2008	Kitt Peak	Spacewatch	·	1.8 km	MPC · JPL
342819	2008 XJ_{16}	—	December 1, 2008	Kitt Peak	Spacewatch	·	1.9 km	MPC · JPL
342820	2008 XP_{16}	—	December 1, 2008	Kitt Peak	Spacewatch	·	2.4 km	MPC · JPL
342821	2008 XQ_{20}	—	December 1, 2008	Mount Lemmon	Mount Lemmon Survey	BRA	1.7 km	MPC · JPL
342822	2008 XO_{21}	—	December 1, 2008	Kitt Peak	Spacewatch	·	3.7 km	MPC · JPL
342823	2008 XQ_{29}	—	December 1, 2008	Kitt Peak	Spacewatch	·	1.1 km	MPC · JPL
342824	2008 XB_{30}	—	December 1, 2008	Mount Lemmon	Mount Lemmon Survey	·	2.7 km	MPC · JPL
342825	2008 XS_{30}	—	December 2, 2008	Kitt Peak	Spacewatch	·	1.5 km	MPC · JPL
342826	2008 XE_{31}	—	May 30, 2002	Palomar	NEAT	DOR	2.7 km	MPC · JPL
342827	2008 XL_{35}	—	December 2, 2008	Kitt Peak	Spacewatch	·	2.1 km	MPC · JPL
342828	2008 XP_{35}	—	November 6, 2008	Kitt Peak	Spacewatch	·	1.5 km	MPC · JPL
342829	2008 XG_{36}	—	December 2, 2008	Kitt Peak	Spacewatch	·	2.2 km	MPC · JPL
342830	2008 XQ_{36}	—	December 2, 2008	Kitt Peak	Spacewatch	·	1.8 km	MPC · JPL
342831	2008 XG_{37}	—	December 2, 2008	Kitt Peak	Spacewatch	(5)	1.6 km	MPC · JPL
342832	2008 XR_{38}	—	December 2, 2008	Kitt Peak	Spacewatch	·	1.9 km	MPC · JPL
342833	2008 XJ_{40}	—	December 2, 2008	Kitt Peak	Spacewatch	·	3.0 km	MPC · JPL
342834	2008 XQ_{42}	—	December 2, 2008	Kitt Peak	Spacewatch	EOS	2.7 km	MPC · JPL
342835	2008 XX_{46}	—	December 6, 2008	Kitt Peak	Spacewatch	·	4.2 km	MPC · JPL
342836	2008 XN_{47}	—	December 2, 2008	Kitt Peak	Spacewatch	·	1.5 km	MPC · JPL
342837	2008 XA_{49}	—	December 4, 2008	Kitt Peak	Spacewatch	·	1.8 km	MPC · JPL
342838	2008 XM_{49}	—	December 7, 2008	Mount Lemmon	Mount Lemmon Survey	·	2.1 km	MPC · JPL
342839	2008 XD_{55}	—	December 7, 2008	Socorro	LINEAR	EUN	1.7 km	MPC · JPL
342840	2008 XU_{55}	—	December 1, 2008	Mount Lemmon	Mount Lemmon Survey	·	1.6 km	MPC · JPL
342841	2008 YG	—	December 17, 2008	Hibiscus	Teamo, N.	·	1.5 km	MPC · JPL
342842	2008 YB_{3}	—	December 18, 2008	Siding Spring	SSS	centaur	67 km	MPC · JPL
342843 Davidbowie	2008 YN_{3}	Davidbowie	December 21, 2008	Calar Alto	F. Hormuth	·	1.8 km	MPC · JPL
342844 Anabel	2008 YA_{4}	Anabel	December 22, 2008	Calar Alto	F. Hormuth	·	2.1 km	MPC · JPL
342845	2008 YF_{4}	—	December 22, 2008	Dauban	Kugel, F.	BRA	2.3 km	MPC · JPL
342846	2008 YV_{4}	—	December 20, 2008	Catalina	CSS	·	3.8 km	MPC · JPL
342847	2008 YL_{5}	—	December 22, 2008	Mayhill	Lowe, A.	·	3.4 km	MPC · JPL
342848	2008 YQ_{5}	—	December 22, 2008	Marly	P. Kocher	·	2.8 km	MPC · JPL
342849	2008 YF_{10}	—	December 20, 2008	Mount Lemmon	Mount Lemmon Survey	·	2.6 km	MPC · JPL
342850	2008 YB_{11}	—	December 20, 2008	Mount Lemmon	Mount Lemmon Survey	·	1.8 km	MPC · JPL
342851	2008 YV_{12}	—	December 21, 2008	Mount Lemmon	Mount Lemmon Survey	·	1.5 km	MPC · JPL
342852	2008 YX_{12}	—	December 21, 2008	Mount Lemmon	Mount Lemmon Survey	·	2.6 km	MPC · JPL
342853	2008 YA_{14}	—	December 20, 2008	Mount Lemmon	Mount Lemmon Survey	·	2.3 km	MPC · JPL
342854	2008 YF_{14}	—	December 20, 2008	Lulin	LUSS	·	2.1 km	MPC · JPL
342855	2008 YL_{15}	—	December 21, 2008	Kitt Peak	Spacewatch	·	2.1 km	MPC · JPL
342856	2008 YM_{15}	—	December 21, 2008	Kitt Peak	Spacewatch	KOR	1.5 km	MPC · JPL
342857	2008 YN_{17}	—	December 21, 2008	Mount Lemmon	Mount Lemmon Survey	WAT	1.7 km	MPC · JPL
342858	2008 YF_{18}	—	December 21, 2008	Kitt Peak	Spacewatch	·	1.8 km	MPC · JPL
342859	2008 YF_{23}	—	December 19, 2008	La Sagra	OAM	·	1.9 km	MPC · JPL
342860	2008 YL_{23}	—	December 20, 2008	La Sagra	OAM	(194)	2.1 km	MPC · JPL
342861	2008 YF_{24}	—	December 22, 2008	La Sagra	OAM	·	3.3 km	MPC · JPL
342862	2008 YL_{27}	—	December 22, 2008	Socorro	LINEAR	·	1.5 km	MPC · JPL
342863	2008 YO_{30}	—	December 30, 2008	Piszkéstető	K. Sárneczky	EOS	2.2 km	MPC · JPL
342864 Teresamateo	2008 YF_{32}	Teresamateo	December 31, 2008	Nazaret	G. Muler, J. M. Ruiz	·	3.7 km	MPC · JPL
342865	2008 YN_{32}	—	December 22, 2008	Kitt Peak	Spacewatch	·	1.9 km	MPC · JPL
342866	2008 YU_{32}	—	December 31, 2008	Mount Lemmon	Mount Lemmon Survey	APO · PHA	320 m	MPC · JPL
342867	2008 YP_{34}	—	December 31, 2008	Bergisch Gladbach	W. Bickel	EOS	3.0 km	MPC · JPL
342868	2008 YJ_{35}	—	December 22, 2008	Kitt Peak	Spacewatch	·	2.8 km	MPC · JPL
342869	2008 YJ_{38}	—	December 29, 2008	Kitt Peak	Spacewatch	·	2.9 km	MPC · JPL
342870	2008 YY_{38}	—	December 29, 2008	Kitt Peak	Spacewatch	·	2.7 km	MPC · JPL
342871	2008 YE_{40}	—	December 29, 2008	Mount Lemmon	Mount Lemmon Survey	·	3.1 km	MPC · JPL
342872	2008 YQ_{40}	—	December 29, 2008	Mount Lemmon	Mount Lemmon Survey	·	4.4 km	MPC · JPL
342873	2008 YS_{40}	—	December 29, 2008	Mount Lemmon	Mount Lemmon Survey	·	1.6 km	MPC · JPL
342874	2008 YP_{42}	—	December 29, 2008	Kitt Peak	Spacewatch	EUN	1.7 km	MPC · JPL
342875	2008 YP_{49}	—	October 15, 2007	Kitt Peak	Spacewatch	·	1.8 km	MPC · JPL
342876	2008 YG_{52}	—	November 3, 2007	Mount Lemmon	Mount Lemmon Survey	EOS	2.0 km	MPC · JPL
342877	2008 YV_{52}	—	December 29, 2008	Mount Lemmon	Mount Lemmon Survey	·	1.8 km	MPC · JPL
342878	2008 YP_{54}	—	December 29, 2008	Mount Lemmon	Mount Lemmon Survey	·	1.9 km	MPC · JPL
342879	2008 YV_{54}	—	December 29, 2008	Mount Lemmon	Mount Lemmon Survey	EOS	2.4 km	MPC · JPL
342880	2008 YX_{56}	—	December 30, 2008	Kitt Peak	Spacewatch	·	1.7 km	MPC · JPL
342881	2008 YC_{58}	—	December 30, 2008	Kitt Peak	Spacewatch	(12739)	1.5 km	MPC · JPL
342882	2008 YO_{58}	—	December 30, 2008	Kitt Peak	Spacewatch	·	2.7 km	MPC · JPL
342883	2008 YG_{64}	—	December 30, 2008	Mount Lemmon	Mount Lemmon Survey	AGN	1.3 km	MPC · JPL
342884	2008 YE_{71}	—	December 29, 2008	Mount Lemmon	Mount Lemmon Survey	·	2.9 km	MPC · JPL
342885	2008 YK_{74}	—	December 30, 2008	Kitt Peak	Spacewatch	·	2.3 km	MPC · JPL
342886	2008 YM_{83}	—	December 31, 2008	Kitt Peak	Spacewatch	KOR	1.3 km	MPC · JPL
342887	2008 YT_{84}	—	December 31, 2008	Kitt Peak	Spacewatch	·	3.9 km	MPC · JPL
342888	2008 YK_{85}	—	December 29, 2008	Kitt Peak	Spacewatch	AGN	1.2 km	MPC · JPL
342889	2008 YM_{85}	—	December 29, 2008	Kitt Peak	Spacewatch	·	2.0 km	MPC · JPL
342890	2008 YJ_{94}	—	December 29, 2008	Kitt Peak	Spacewatch	·	2.6 km	MPC · JPL
342891	2008 YF_{95}	—	December 29, 2008	Kitt Peak	Spacewatch	EOS	2.4 km	MPC · JPL
342892	2008 YG_{99}	—	December 29, 2008	Kitt Peak	Spacewatch	·	2.1 km	MPC · JPL
342893	2008 YG_{100}	—	December 29, 2008	Kitt Peak	Spacewatch	·	2.1 km	MPC · JPL
342894	2008 YP_{100}	—	December 29, 2008	Kitt Peak	Spacewatch	KOR	1.9 km	MPC · JPL
342895	2008 YT_{100}	—	December 29, 2008	Kitt Peak	Spacewatch	·	3.5 km	MPC · JPL
342896	2008 YW_{101}	—	December 29, 2008	Kitt Peak	Spacewatch	·	1.9 km	MPC · JPL
342897	2008 YM_{107}	—	December 29, 2008	Kitt Peak	Spacewatch	·	2.9 km	MPC · JPL
342898	2008 YZ_{110}	—	December 31, 2008	Kitt Peak	Spacewatch	AGN	1.5 km	MPC · JPL
342899	2008 YW_{113}	—	December 29, 2008	Kitt Peak	Spacewatch	KOR	2.0 km	MPC · JPL
342900	2008 YZ_{117}	—	December 29, 2008	Mount Lemmon	Mount Lemmon Survey	EOS	2.4 km	MPC · JPL

== 342901–343000 ==
back to top

Designation			Discovery			Properties		Ref
Permanent	Provisional	Named after	Date	Site	Discoverer(s)	Category	Diam.	Ref
342901	2008 YO_{120}	—	December 30, 2008	Kitt Peak	Spacewatch	·	3.7 km	MPC · JPL
342902	2008 YM_{121}	—	December 30, 2008	Kitt Peak	Spacewatch	·	2.5 km	MPC · JPL
342903	2008 YP_{123}	—	December 30, 2008	Kitt Peak	Spacewatch	·	3.4 km	MPC · JPL
342904	2008 YL_{125}	—	December 30, 2008	Kitt Peak	Spacewatch	·	2.5 km	MPC · JPL
342905	2008 YP_{126}	—	December 30, 2008	Kitt Peak	Spacewatch	·	3.2 km	MPC · JPL
342906	2008 YE_{127}	—	December 30, 2008	Kitt Peak	Spacewatch	KOR	1.6 km	MPC · JPL
342907	2008 YN_{127}	—	December 21, 2008	Kitt Peak	Spacewatch	·	2.7 km	MPC · JPL
342908	2008 YP_{133}	—	December 29, 2008	Catalina	CSS	·	2.2 km	MPC · JPL
342909	2008 YK_{134}	—	December 30, 2008	Kitt Peak	Spacewatch	AST	1.7 km	MPC · JPL
342910	2008 YM_{146}	—	December 30, 2008	Kitt Peak	Spacewatch	·	2.5 km	MPC · JPL
342911	2008 YG_{149}	—	December 21, 2008	Kitt Peak	Spacewatch	KOR	1.8 km	MPC · JPL
342912	2008 YZ_{151}	—	December 22, 2008	Mount Lemmon	Mount Lemmon Survey	EOS	2.6 km	MPC · JPL
342913	2008 YM_{153}	—	December 21, 2008	Kitt Peak	Spacewatch	·	2.2 km	MPC · JPL
342914	2008 YT_{153}	—	December 21, 2008	Catalina	CSS	·	3.7 km	MPC · JPL
342915	2008 YA_{154}	—	December 21, 2008	Kitt Peak	Spacewatch	·	3.0 km	MPC · JPL
342916	2008 YN_{155}	—	December 22, 2008	Kitt Peak	Spacewatch	·	2.1 km	MPC · JPL
342917	2008 YA_{156}	—	December 25, 2008	Lulin	LUSS	·	5.5 km	MPC · JPL
342918	2008 YP_{156}	—	December 30, 2008	Mount Lemmon	Mount Lemmon Survey	·	2.0 km	MPC · JPL
342919	2008 YY_{156}	—	December 21, 2008	Catalina	CSS	·	3.5 km	MPC · JPL
342920	2008 YW_{157}	—	December 30, 2008	Mount Lemmon	Mount Lemmon Survey	·	4.3 km	MPC · JPL
342921	2008 YM_{158}	—	December 29, 2008	Mount Lemmon	Mount Lemmon Survey	·	5.0 km	MPC · JPL
342922	2008 YE_{167}	—	April 1, 2001	Anderson Mesa	LONEOS	EUN	2.0 km	MPC · JPL
342923	2008 YN_{168}	—	December 31, 2008	Catalina	CSS	·	2.9 km	MPC · JPL
342924	2008 YT_{168}	—	November 1, 2008	Mount Lemmon	Mount Lemmon Survey	·	3.3 km	MPC · JPL
342925	2008 YO_{169}	—	December 30, 2008	Mount Lemmon	Mount Lemmon Survey	·	2.0 km	MPC · JPL
342926	2008 YX_{169}	—	December 21, 2008	Catalina	CSS	GEF	1.6 km	MPC · JPL
342927	2008 YA_{171}	—	December 31, 2008	Kitt Peak	Spacewatch	·	2.5 km	MPC · JPL
342928	2008 YJ_{171}	—	December 29, 2008	Catalina	CSS	·	2.8 km	MPC · JPL
342929	2008 YW_{171}	—	December 22, 2008	Kitt Peak	Spacewatch	KOR	1.3 km	MPC · JPL
342930	2009 AV_{1}	—	January 3, 2009	Wildberg	R. Apitzsch	·	1.7 km	MPC · JPL
342931	2009 AF_{12}	—	January 2, 2009	Mount Lemmon	Mount Lemmon Survey	·	3.4 km	MPC · JPL
342932	2009 AY_{18}	—	January 2, 2009	Kitt Peak	Spacewatch	·	3.4 km	MPC · JPL
342933	2009 AH_{21}	—	January 3, 2009	Kitt Peak	Spacewatch	·	2.0 km	MPC · JPL
342934	2009 AR_{21}	—	January 3, 2009	Kitt Peak	Spacewatch	MRX	1.1 km	MPC · JPL
342935	2009 AV_{21}	—	January 3, 2009	Kitt Peak	Spacewatch	·	2.0 km	MPC · JPL
342936	2009 AS_{22}	—	January 3, 2009	Kitt Peak	Spacewatch	·	1.6 km	MPC · JPL
342937	2009 AJ_{23}	—	January 3, 2009	Kitt Peak	Spacewatch	·	3.3 km	MPC · JPL
342938	2009 AX_{23}	—	January 3, 2009	Kitt Peak	Spacewatch	·	2.5 km	MPC · JPL
342939	2009 AA_{24}	—	January 3, 2009	Kitt Peak	Spacewatch	·	2.0 km	MPC · JPL
342940	2009 AH_{24}	—	January 3, 2009	Kitt Peak	Spacewatch	·	2.5 km	MPC · JPL
342941	2009 AU_{30}	—	January 15, 2009	Kitt Peak	Spacewatch	KOR	1.4 km	MPC · JPL
342942	2009 AY_{31}	—	January 15, 2009	Kitt Peak	Spacewatch	·	2.2 km	MPC · JPL
342943	2009 AO_{32}	—	January 15, 2009	Kitt Peak	Spacewatch	EOS	2.2 km	MPC · JPL
342944	2009 AX_{32}	—	January 15, 2009	Kitt Peak	Spacewatch	·	1.8 km	MPC · JPL
342945	2009 AK_{35}	—	January 15, 2009	Kitt Peak	Spacewatch	·	2.2 km	MPC · JPL
342946	2009 AY_{36}	—	January 15, 2009	Kitt Peak	Spacewatch	WIT	1.5 km	MPC · JPL
342947	2009 AS_{37}	—	January 15, 2009	Kitt Peak	Spacewatch	·	4.2 km	MPC · JPL
342948	2009 AZ_{37}	—	January 15, 2009	Kitt Peak	Spacewatch	·	1.3 km	MPC · JPL
342949	2009 AQ_{38}	—	January 15, 2009	Kitt Peak	Spacewatch	·	2.9 km	MPC · JPL
342950	2009 AD_{39}	—	January 15, 2009	Kitt Peak	Spacewatch	AGN	1.3 km	MPC · JPL
342951	2009 AE_{44}	—	January 3, 2009	Mount Lemmon	Mount Lemmon Survey	·	2.4 km	MPC · JPL
342952	2009 AD_{45}	—	January 15, 2009	Kitt Peak	Spacewatch	·	3.0 km	MPC · JPL
342953	2009 AE_{47}	—	January 1, 2009	Kitt Peak	Spacewatch	·	2.7 km	MPC · JPL
342954	2009 AS_{48}	—	January 3, 2009	Mount Lemmon	Mount Lemmon Survey	EOS	2.6 km	MPC · JPL
342955	2009 AN_{49}	—	January 1, 2009	Kitt Peak	Spacewatch	EMA	3.8 km	MPC · JPL
342956	2009 AX_{49}	—	January 15, 2009	Kitt Peak	Spacewatch	·	3.9 km	MPC · JPL
342957	2009 BH	—	January 17, 2009	Catalina	CSS	BAR	2.3 km	MPC · JPL
342958	2009 BL	—	January 16, 2009	Dauban	Kugel, F.	·	4.8 km	MPC · JPL
342959	2009 BM	—	January 16, 2009	Dauban	Kugel, F.	·	3.1 km	MPC · JPL
342960	2009 BP	—	January 16, 2009	Calar Alto	F. Hormuth	·	2.1 km	MPC · JPL
342961	2009 BB_{1}	—	January 16, 2009	Dauban	Kugel, F.	AGN	1.3 km	MPC · JPL
342962	2009 BU_{6}	—	January 18, 2009	Socorro	LINEAR	·	3.0 km	MPC · JPL
342963	2009 BY_{6}	—	January 18, 2009	Socorro	LINEAR	·	3.6 km	MPC · JPL
342964	2009 BF_{7}	—	January 18, 2009	Socorro	LINEAR	·	3.2 km	MPC · JPL
342965	2009 BG_{8}	—	January 17, 2009	Socorro	LINEAR	AEG	4.1 km	MPC · JPL
342966	2009 BA_{10}	—	January 18, 2009	Sandlot	G. Hug	EOS	2.1 km	MPC · JPL
342967	2009 BT_{10}	—	January 25, 2009	Mayhill	Lowe, A.	·	2.1 km	MPC · JPL
342968	2009 BQ_{13}	—	January 25, 2009	Hibiscus	Teamo, N.	·	2.0 km	MPC · JPL
342969	2009 BK_{15}	—	January 16, 2009	Mount Lemmon	Mount Lemmon Survey	NEM	2.7 km	MPC · JPL
342970	2009 BY_{16}	—	January 16, 2009	Kitt Peak	Spacewatch	EOS	2.3 km	MPC · JPL
342971	2009 BX_{21}	—	January 17, 2009	Sierra Stars	Dillon, W. G.	KOR	1.3 km	MPC · JPL
342972	2009 BE_{24}	—	January 17, 2009	Kitt Peak	Spacewatch	·	3.6 km	MPC · JPL
342973	2009 BH_{24}	—	January 17, 2009	Kitt Peak	Spacewatch	·	2.8 km	MPC · JPL
342974	2009 BW_{25}	—	January 16, 2009	Kitt Peak	Spacewatch	·	2.9 km	MPC · JPL
342975	2009 BV_{27}	—	January 16, 2009	Kitt Peak	Spacewatch	·	1.8 km	MPC · JPL
342976	2009 BO_{36}	—	January 16, 2009	Kitt Peak	Spacewatch	·	4.9 km	MPC · JPL
342977	2009 BU_{39}	—	January 16, 2009	Kitt Peak	Spacewatch	EOS	2.6 km	MPC · JPL
342978	2009 BQ_{40}	—	January 16, 2009	Kitt Peak	Spacewatch	·	3.1 km	MPC · JPL
342979	2009 BK_{42}	—	January 16, 2009	Kitt Peak	Spacewatch	KOR	1.5 km	MPC · JPL
342980	2009 BN_{42}	—	January 16, 2009	Kitt Peak	Spacewatch	·	3.7 km	MPC · JPL
342981	2009 BJ_{43}	—	January 16, 2009	Kitt Peak	Spacewatch	·	1.8 km	MPC · JPL
342982	2009 BV_{45}	—	January 16, 2009	Kitt Peak	Spacewatch	VER	4.1 km	MPC · JPL
342983	2009 BN_{46}	—	January 16, 2009	Kitt Peak	Spacewatch	·	3.6 km	MPC · JPL
342984	2009 BM_{47}	—	January 16, 2009	Kitt Peak	Spacewatch	·	2.9 km	MPC · JPL
342985	2009 BY_{48}	—	January 16, 2009	Mount Lemmon	Mount Lemmon Survey	·	4.0 km	MPC · JPL
342986	2009 BN_{49}	—	January 16, 2009	Mount Lemmon	Mount Lemmon Survey	·	2.2 km	MPC · JPL
342987	2009 BL_{50}	—	January 16, 2009	Mount Lemmon	Mount Lemmon Survey	·	2.6 km	MPC · JPL
342988	2009 BT_{51}	—	January 16, 2009	Mount Lemmon	Mount Lemmon Survey	·	5.4 km	MPC · JPL
342989	2009 BL_{52}	—	January 16, 2009	Kitt Peak	Spacewatch	URS	6.0 km	MPC · JPL
342990	2009 BP_{54}	—	January 16, 2009	Mount Lemmon	Mount Lemmon Survey	KOR	1.5 km	MPC · JPL
342991	2009 BU_{54}	—	January 16, 2009	Mount Lemmon	Mount Lemmon Survey	·	3.5 km	MPC · JPL
342992	2009 BA_{58}	—	January 20, 2009	Kitt Peak	Spacewatch	·	2.3 km	MPC · JPL
342993	2009 BW_{60}	—	January 17, 2009	La Sagra	OAM	·	2.3 km	MPC · JPL
342994	2009 BC_{62}	—	January 18, 2009	Mount Lemmon	Mount Lemmon Survey	·	3.0 km	MPC · JPL
342995	2009 BB_{65}	—	January 20, 2009	Kitt Peak	Spacewatch	EOS	2.2 km	MPC · JPL
342996	2009 BN_{68}	—	January 23, 2009	Purple Mountain	PMO NEO Survey Program	·	2.0 km	MPC · JPL
342997	2009 BB_{69}	—	January 25, 2009	Kitt Peak	Spacewatch	·	1.6 km	MPC · JPL
342998	2009 BF_{71}	—	January 26, 2009	Purple Mountain	PMO NEO Survey Program	·	2.4 km	MPC · JPL
342999	2009 BP_{72}	—	January 28, 2009	Dauban	Kugel, F.	·	2.3 km	MPC · JPL
343000 Ijontichy	2009 BH_{73}	Ijontichy	January 29, 2009	Taunus	E. Schwab, Zimmer, U.	·	2.6 km	MPC · JPL

back to top

== See also ==
- Meanings of minor-planet names: 342001–343000
