= Meanings of minor-planet names: 342001–343000 =

As minor planet discoveries are confirmed, they are given a permanent number by the IAU's Minor Planet Center (MPC), and the discoverers can then submit names for them, following the IAU's naming conventions. The list below concerns those minor planets in the specified number-range that have received names, and explains the meanings of those names.

Official naming citations of newly named small Solar System bodies are approved and published in a bulletin by IAU's Working Group for Small Bodies Nomenclature (WGSBN). Before May 2021, citations were published in MPC's Minor Planet Circulars for many decades. Recent citations can also be found on the JPL Small-Body Database (SBDB). Until his death in 2016, German astronomer Lutz D. Schmadel compiled these citations into the Dictionary of Minor Planet Names (DMP) and regularly updated the collection.

Based on Paul Herget's The Names of the Minor Planets, Schmadel also researched the unclear origin of numerous asteroids, most of which had been named prior to World War II. This article incorporates text from this source, which is in the public domain: SBDB New namings may only be added to this list below after official publication as the preannouncement of names is condemned. The WGSBN publishes a comprehensive guideline for the naming rules of non-cometary small Solar System bodies.

== 342001–342100 ==
Named minor planet	Provisional	This minor planet was named for...	Ref · Catalog
342017 Ramonin	2008 RA_{80}	Ramon Lacruz Alcaraz (born 1988) is an aeronautical engineer at Universidad Politecnica de Madrid.	JPL · 342017

== 342101–342200 ==
back to top

Named minor planet	Provisional	This minor planet was named for...	Ref · Catalog
There are no named minor planets in this number range

== 342201–342300 ==
back to top

Named minor planet	Provisional	This minor planet was named for...	Ref · Catalog
342204 Oak Cliff	2008 SZ_{223}	Oak Cliff, a town in Dallas, Texas, gets its name from the massive oaks along the Trinity River cliffs.	IAU · 34204

== 342301–342400 ==
back to top

Named minor planet	Provisional	This minor planet was named for...	Ref · Catalog
342372 Titia	2008 UQ_{5}	Patricia ‘Titia’ Colombin (1954–2022) was the companion of the discoverer. A talented painter, she also contributed to the creation and development of the Dauban Observatory.	IAU · 342372

== 342401–342500 ==
back to top

Named minor planet	Provisional	This minor planet was named for...	Ref · Catalog
342431 Hilo	2008 UQ_{90}	Hilo, the largest city on Big island of Hawaii, United States	JPL · 342431

== 342501–342600 ==
back to top

Named minor planet	Provisional	This minor planet was named for...	Ref · Catalog
There are no named minor planets in this number range

== 342601–342700 ==
back to top

Named minor planet	Provisional	This minor planet was named for...	Ref · Catalog
342620 Beita	2008 UL_{341}	Beatriz Lacruz Alcaraz (born 1990), a computer sciences engineer at the Universidad Politecnica de Madrid.	JPL · 342620

== 342701–342800 ==
back to top

Named minor planet	Provisional	This minor planet was named for...	Ref · Catalog
342764 Alantitus	2008 WL_{95}	Alan Titus (born 1964) is an American paleontologist specializing in ammonites. He has also been instrumental in finding and describing new species of dinosaurs from the Late Cretaceous subcontinent of Laramidia.	JPL · 342764

== 342801–342900 ==
back to top

Named minor planet	Provisional	This minor planet was named for...	Ref · Catalog
342843 Davidbowie	2008 YN_{3}	David Bowie (David Robert Jones, 1947–2016), a British musician, singer, producer and actor.	JPL · 342843
342844 Anabel	2008 YA_{4}	Anabel Elisabeth Hormuth (b. 2023), the daughter of the discoverer.	IAU · 342844
342864 Teresamateo	2008 YF_{32}	Teresa Mateo (b. 1967) is a Spanish economist and an amateur astronomer.	IAU · 342864

== 342901–343000 ==
back to top

Named minor planet	Provisional	This minor planet was named for...	Ref · Catalog
343000 Ijontichy	2009 BH_{73}	Ijon Tichy: Space Pilot, a satirical German science fiction TV-series. The space traveller Ijon Tichý navigates the universe in his ""three-room rocket". The story is based on The Star Diaries by Stanisław Lem.	JPL · 343000

back to top

Preceded by 341,001–342,000	Meanings of minor-planet names List of minor planets: 342,001–343,000	Succeeded by 343,001–344,000
