= 342843 Davidbowie =

Asteroid

Discovery
- Discovered by: F. Hormuth
- Discovery site: Calar Alto Obs.
- Discovery date: 21 December 2008

Designations
- Pronunciation: /ˌdeɪvɪdˈboʊ.iː/
- Named after: David Bowie (British singer-songwriter)
- Alternative designations: 2008 YN_{3} · 2003 SG_{99}
- Minor planet category: main-belt · (middle); Henan

Orbital characteristics
- Epoch 4 September 2017 (JD 2458000.5)
- Uncertainty parameter 0
- Observation arc: 12.87 yr (4,702 days)
- Aphelion: 2.9935 AU
- Perihelion: 2.5040 AU
- Semi-major axis: 2.7487 AU
- Eccentricity: 0.0890
- Orbital period (sidereal): 4.56 yr (1,665 days)
- Mean anomaly: 33.438°
- Mean motion: 0° 12^{m} 58.68^{s} / day
- Inclination: 2.7679°
- Longitude of ascending node: 62.359°
- Argument of perihelion: 300.43°

Physical characteristics
- Dimensions: 1.4 km (est. at 0.13)
- Geometric albedo: 0.13 (parent albedo)
- Absolute magnitude (H): 17.1

342843 Davidbowie (provisional designation 2008 YN_{3}) is a Henan asteroid from the central region of the asteroid belt, approximately 1.4 kilometers in diameter.

The asteroid was discovered on 21 December 2008, by German astronomer Felix Hormuth from Max-Planck-Institute for Astronomy at Calar Alto Observatory in Almería, southeastern Spain. It was named for English singer-songwriter David Bowie.

== Orbit and classification ==
Davidbowie is a member of the Henan family (532), a large family of L-type asteroids in the intermediate main-belt, named after 2085 Henan. It orbits the Sun in the central asteroid belt at a distance of 2.5–3.0 AU once every 4 years and 7 months (1,665 days; semi-major axis of 2.75 AU). The asteroid has a well-observed orbit with the lowest possible condition code. Its orbit has an eccentricity of 0.09 and an inclination of 3° with respect to the ecliptic.

It was first identified as 2003 SG_{99} at the Steward Observatory (Kitt Peak) in September 2003, extending the asteroid's observation arc by almost 5 years prior to its official discovery observation at Calar Alto.

Notably, the asteroid had a close encounter with the 200 kilometer-sized asteroid 16 Psyche, one of the most massive bodies in the main-belt, which it passed at only 0.04 AU (6,000,000 km) on 15 May 1935.

== Physical characteristics ==
Based on its absolute magnitude of 17.1, Davidbowie's diameter can be estimated to measure approximately 1.4 kilometers, using an albedo of 0.13, derived from the family's parent body, 2085 Henan.

As of 2017, Davidbowie's effective size and shape, as well as its poles, albedo and rotation period remain unknown.

== Naming ==
In 2015, this minor planet was named after English singer, songwriter and actor David Bowie (1947–2016), just three days before Bowie's 68th birthday. Considered to be one of the most influential artists, Bowie released more than 25 albums, including The Rise and Fall of Ziggy Stardust and the Spiders from Mars. He was also an actor in movies such as Labyrinth and The Prestige. The approved naming citation was published by the Minor Planet Center on 5 January 2015 (M.P.C. 91793),
