= 2085 Henan =

Asteroid

Discovery
- Discovered by: Purple Mountain Obs.
- Discovery site: Purple Mountain Obs.
- Discovery date: 20 December 1965

Designations
- Named after: Henan (Province of China)
- Alternative designations: 1965 YA · 1933 RE; 1938 WR · 1949 FL; 1949 FP_{1} · 1962 CL; 1963 KA · 1969 VA_{1} 1971 BG_{1} · 1972 LX; 1973 QX_{1} · 1976 GR_{7}
- Minor planet category: main-belt · (outer); Henan

Orbital characteristics
- Epoch 4 September 2017 (JD 2458000.5)
- Uncertainty parameter 0
- Observation arc: 68.61 yr (25,060 days)
- Aphelion: 2.9312 AU
- Perihelion: 2.4654 AU
- Semi-major axis: 2.6983 AU
- Eccentricity: 0.0863
- Orbital period (sidereal): 4.43 yr (1,619 days)
- Mean anomaly: 276.34°
- Mean motion: 0° 13^{m} 20.64^{s} / day
- Inclination: 3.8343°
- Longitude of ascending node: 118.14°
- Argument of perihelion: 294.54°

Physical characteristics
- Dimensions: 13.356±0.036 km 13.67 km (calculated); 13.941±0.082 km 16.56±4.50 km 17.61±0.32 km 18 km 18.34±1.20 km
- Synodic rotation period: 24 h 110±1 h
- Geometric albedo: 0.10±0.08; 0.131±0.019; 0.145±0.020; 0.18 (assumed); 0.2510±0.0408
- Spectral type: SMASS = L L (Bus–DeMeo)
- Absolute magnitude (H): 11.40 · 11.55±0.48 · 11.60 · 11.8 · 11.9 · 12.12

2085 Henan, provisional designation 1965 YA, is a potentially slow rotating asteroid and the parent body of the Henan family in the central regions of the asteroid belt, approximately 15 kilometers in diameter. It was discovered on 20 December 1965, by astronomers at the Purple Mountain Observatory in Nanking, China. The asteroid was named for the Henan Province in China.

== Orbit and classification ==
Henan is the parent body of the Henan family (532), a large family of L-type asteroids in the intermediate main-belt, which can be further divided into four distinct families.

It orbits the Sun in the central asteroid belt at a distance of 2.5–2.9 AU once every 4 years and 5 months (1,619 days; semi-major axis of 2.70 AU). Its orbit has an eccentricity of 0.09 and an inclination of 4° with respect to the ecliptic.

A first observation of this asteroid was found on a precovery, taken at the Lowell Observatory in July 1906. The body's observation arc begins at Goethe Link Observatory in July 1943, more than 22 years prior to its official discovery observation at Purple Mountain.

== Physical characteristics ==
In the Bus–DeMeo and SMASS classification, Henan is an uncommon L-type asteroid, which is also the overall spectral type for members of the Henan family.

=== Rotation period ===
As of 2017, no secure rotational lightcurve of Henan has been obtained. In September 2004, observations by Laurent Bernasconi gave a rotation period of 24 hours with a brightness variation of 0.25 magnitude (U=1). In February 2015, photometric observations of Henan by an international collaboration of astronomers gave a tentative synodic period of 110±1 hours and an amplitude of 0.4 magnitude, which would make it a potentially slow rotator (U=1). An alternative period solution gave 94 hours. The latter study selected Henan because it is a suspected "Barbarian" asteroid (named after 234 Barbara) which polarimetric properties suggest that they have an unusual shape and topographic features with large concave areas.

=== Diameter and albedo ===
According to the surveys carried out by the Japanese Akari satellite and the NEOWISE mission of NASA's Wide-field Infrared Survey Explorer, Henan measures between 13.356 and 18.34 kilometers in diameter and its surface has an albedo between 0.10 and 0.2510.

The Collaborative Asteroid Lightcurve Link assumes an albedo of 0.18 and calculates a diameter of 13.67 kilometers based on an absolute magnitude of 11.8.

== Naming ==
This minor planet was named after the Henan Province in the People's Republic of China, located in the central part of the country along the lower stretch of the Yellow River, which is considered the cradle of civilization in ancient China. The official naming citation was published by the Minor Planet Center on 1 February 1980 (M.P.C. 5184).
