= List of minor planets: 343001–344000 =

The following is a partial list of minor planets, running from minor-planet number 343001 through 344000, inclusive. The primary data for this and other partial lists is based on JPL's "Small-Body Orbital Elements" and data available from the Minor Planet Center. Critical list information is also provided by the MPC, unless otherwise specified from Lowell Observatory. A detailed description of the table's columns and additional sources are given on the main page including a complete list of every page in this series, and a statistical break-up on the dynamical classification of minor planets.

Also see the summary list of all named bodies in numerical and alphabetical order, and the corresponding naming citations for the number range of this particular list. New namings may only be added to this list after official publication, as the preannouncement of names is condemned by the Working Group for Small Bodies Nomenclature of the International Astronomical Union.

Near-Earth obj.	MBA (inner)	MBA (outer)	Centaur
Mars-crosser	MBA (middle)	Jupiter trojan	Trans-Neptunian obj.
Unclassified

== 343001–343100 ==
Designation			Discovery			Properties		Ref
Permanent	Provisional	Named after	Date	Site	Discoverer(s)	Category	Diam.	Ref
343001	2009 BH_{75}	—	January 21, 2009	Bergisch Gladbach	W. Bickel	·	2.5 km	MPC · JPL
343002	2009 BL_{76}	—	January 26, 2009	Purple Mountain	PMO NEO Survey Program	EUN	2.0 km	MPC · JPL
343003	2009 BB_{78}	—	January 29, 2009	Kachina	Hobart, J.	·	5.0 km	MPC · JPL
343004	2009 BD_{78}	—	January 29, 2009	Dauban	Kugel, F.	·	5.1 km	MPC · JPL
343005	2009 BB_{81}	—	January 30, 2009	Taunus	Karge, S., R. Kling	·	4.6 km	MPC · JPL
343006	2009 BO_{83}	—	October 21, 2001	Kitt Peak	Spacewatch	·	3.7 km	MPC · JPL
343007	2009 BW_{84}	—	January 25, 2009	Kitt Peak	Spacewatch	·	3.5 km	MPC · JPL
343008	2009 BV_{86}	—	January 25, 2009	Kitt Peak	Spacewatch	·	3.8 km	MPC · JPL
343009	2009 BL_{89}	—	January 25, 2009	Kitt Peak	Spacewatch	·	3.4 km	MPC · JPL
343010	2009 BO_{89}	—	January 25, 2009	Kitt Peak	Spacewatch	·	1.7 km	MPC · JPL
343011	2009 BR_{90}	—	January 25, 2009	Kitt Peak	Spacewatch	EOS	2.3 km	MPC · JPL
343012	2009 BU_{91}	—	January 25, 2009	Kitt Peak	Spacewatch	·	2.5 km	MPC · JPL
343013	2009 BM_{92}	—	January 25, 2009	Kitt Peak	Spacewatch	·	1.8 km	MPC · JPL
343014	2009 BV_{92}	—	January 25, 2009	Kitt Peak	Spacewatch	·	3.7 km	MPC · JPL
343015	2009 BU_{93}	—	January 25, 2009	Kitt Peak	Spacewatch	·	2.8 km	MPC · JPL
343016	2009 BZ_{94}	—	January 15, 2009	Kitt Peak	Spacewatch	·	4.0 km	MPC · JPL
343017	2009 BF_{95}	—	January 26, 2009	Mount Lemmon	Mount Lemmon Survey	·	1.7 km	MPC · JPL
343018	2009 BB_{97}	—	January 25, 2009	Catalina	CSS	·	5.7 km	MPC · JPL
343019	2009 BE_{100}	—	January 29, 2009	Kitt Peak	Spacewatch	KOR	1.5 km	MPC · JPL
343020	2009 BH_{100}	—	January 29, 2009	Kitt Peak	Spacewatch	·	2.0 km	MPC · JPL
343021	2009 BL_{108}	—	January 29, 2009	Mount Lemmon	Mount Lemmon Survey	EOS	1.9 km	MPC · JPL
343022	2009 BC_{114}	—	January 26, 2009	Mount Lemmon	Mount Lemmon Survey	·	1.9 km	MPC · JPL
343023	2009 BG_{115}	—	January 28, 2009	Catalina	CSS	·	4.7 km	MPC · JPL
343024	2009 BY_{115}	—	January 29, 2009	Kitt Peak	Spacewatch	·	3.3 km	MPC · JPL
343025	2009 BN_{120}	—	January 31, 2009	Kitt Peak	Spacewatch	·	5.5 km	MPC · JPL
343026	2009 BV_{122}	—	January 31, 2009	Kitt Peak	Spacewatch	·	3.3 km	MPC · JPL
343027	2009 BE_{126}	—	January 29, 2009	Kitt Peak	Spacewatch	·	3.0 km	MPC · JPL
343028	2009 BJ_{128}	—	January 29, 2009	Mount Lemmon	Mount Lemmon Survey	·	3.5 km	MPC · JPL
343029	2009 BZ_{128}	—	January 29, 2009	Mount Lemmon	Mount Lemmon Survey	·	3.5 km	MPC · JPL
343030	2009 BH_{132}	—	January 30, 2009	Mount Lemmon	Mount Lemmon Survey	·	4.3 km	MPC · JPL
343031	2009 BC_{135}	—	January 29, 2009	Kitt Peak	Spacewatch	KOR	1.4 km	MPC · JPL
343032	2009 BG_{135}	—	January 29, 2009	Kitt Peak	Spacewatch	·	1.4 km	MPC · JPL
343033	2009 BM_{136}	—	January 29, 2009	Kitt Peak	Spacewatch	·	2.4 km	MPC · JPL
343034	2009 BP_{139}	—	January 29, 2009	Kitt Peak	Spacewatch	·	2.5 km	MPC · JPL
343035	2009 BK_{140}	—	January 29, 2009	Kitt Peak	Spacewatch	·	2.8 km	MPC · JPL
343036	2009 BZ_{140}	—	January 30, 2009	Kitt Peak	Spacewatch	·	2.4 km	MPC · JPL
343037	2009 BF_{141}	—	January 30, 2009	Kitt Peak	Spacewatch	·	1.6 km	MPC · JPL
343038	2009 BE_{142}	—	January 30, 2009	Kitt Peak	Spacewatch	·	2.3 km	MPC · JPL
343039	2009 BQ_{146}	—	January 30, 2009	Mount Lemmon	Mount Lemmon Survey	·	3.6 km	MPC · JPL
343040	2009 BC_{148}	—	January 30, 2009	Mount Lemmon	Mount Lemmon Survey	EOS	2.3 km	MPC · JPL
343041	2009 BK_{153}	—	January 31, 2009	Kitt Peak	Spacewatch	EOS	2.3 km	MPC · JPL
343042	2009 BO_{156}	—	October 31, 2007	Kitt Peak	Spacewatch	THM	2.4 km	MPC · JPL
343043	2009 BT_{157}	—	January 31, 2009	Kitt Peak	Spacewatch	·	1.3 km	MPC · JPL
343044	2009 BB_{158}	—	January 31, 2009	Kitt Peak	Spacewatch	THM	2.6 km	MPC · JPL
343045	2009 BV_{160}	—	January 31, 2009	Mount Lemmon	Mount Lemmon Survey	·	3.4 km	MPC · JPL
343046	2009 BM_{162}	—	January 30, 2009	Mount Lemmon	Mount Lemmon Survey	VER	4.2 km	MPC · JPL
343047	2009 BA_{163}	—	January 31, 2009	Kitt Peak	Spacewatch	EOS	1.8 km	MPC · JPL
343048	2009 BU_{166}	—	January 31, 2009	Mount Lemmon	Mount Lemmon Survey	·	3.1 km	MPC · JPL
343049	2009 BJ_{170}	—	January 16, 2009	Kitt Peak	Spacewatch	VER	3.3 km	MPC · JPL
343050	2009 BF_{176}	—	January 31, 2009	Mount Lemmon	Mount Lemmon Survey	·	4.1 km	MPC · JPL
343051	2009 BS_{177}	—	January 31, 2009	Kitt Peak	Spacewatch	·	4.8 km	MPC · JPL
343052	2009 BS_{181}	—	January 20, 2009	Mount Lemmon	Mount Lemmon Survey	·	3.6 km	MPC · JPL
343053	2009 BO_{182}	—	January 18, 2009	Mount Lemmon	Mount Lemmon Survey	·	2.9 km	MPC · JPL
343054	2009 BJ_{187}	—	January 29, 2009	Mount Lemmon	Mount Lemmon Survey	EOS	2.4 km	MPC · JPL
343055	2009 CD_{12}	—	February 1, 2009	Kitt Peak	Spacewatch	·	2.7 km	MPC · JPL
343056	2009 CW_{14}	—	February 1, 2009	Kitt Peak	Spacewatch	·	3.3 km	MPC · JPL
343057 Lucaravenni	2009 CB_{20}	Lucaravenni	February 15, 2009	San Marcello	L. Tesi, Fagioli, G.	·	2.8 km	MPC · JPL
343058	2009 CQ_{21}	—	February 1, 2009	Kitt Peak	Spacewatch	VER	3.3 km	MPC · JPL
343059	2009 CG_{22}	—	February 1, 2009	Kitt Peak	Spacewatch	KOR	1.3 km	MPC · JPL
343060	2009 CJ_{23}	—	October 12, 2007	Mount Lemmon	Mount Lemmon Survey	·	2.8 km	MPC · JPL
343061	2009 CM_{24}	—	February 1, 2009	Kitt Peak	Spacewatch	EOS	2.2 km	MPC · JPL
343062	2009 CB_{25}	—	February 1, 2009	Mount Lemmon	Mount Lemmon Survey	EOS	2.6 km	MPC · JPL
343063	2009 CN_{26}	—	February 1, 2009	Kitt Peak	Spacewatch	·	4.6 km	MPC · JPL
343064	2009 CP_{28}	—	February 1, 2009	Kitt Peak	Spacewatch	·	2.4 km	MPC · JPL
343065	2009 CU_{28}	—	February 1, 2009	Kitt Peak	Spacewatch	EOS	2.3 km	MPC · JPL
343066	2009 CY_{30}	—	February 1, 2009	Kitt Peak	Spacewatch	·	3.8 km	MPC · JPL
343067	2009 CT_{31}	—	February 1, 2009	Kitt Peak	Spacewatch	·	2.0 km	MPC · JPL
343068	2009 CR_{35}	—	February 2, 2009	Mount Lemmon	Mount Lemmon Survey	·	4.4 km	MPC · JPL
343069	2009 CN_{39}	—	February 14, 2009	Mount Lemmon	Mount Lemmon Survey	·	6.5 km	MPC · JPL
343070	2009 CK_{49}	—	February 14, 2009	Mount Lemmon	Mount Lemmon Survey	3:2	7.9 km	MPC · JPL
343071	2009 CF_{56}	—	February 1, 2009	Catalina	CSS	·	2.1 km	MPC · JPL
343072	2009 CL_{56}	—	February 3, 2009	Kitt Peak	Spacewatch	·	2.4 km	MPC · JPL
343073	2009 CA_{57}	—	February 5, 2009	Mount Lemmon	Mount Lemmon Survey	·	3.8 km	MPC · JPL
343074	2009 CD_{58}	—	February 3, 2009	Mount Lemmon	Mount Lemmon Survey	·	3.1 km	MPC · JPL
343075	2009 CR_{58}	—	February 4, 2009	Mount Lemmon	Mount Lemmon Survey	EOS	1.9 km	MPC · JPL
343076	2009 CB_{59}	—	February 5, 2009	Kitt Peak	Spacewatch	·	3.1 km	MPC · JPL
343077	2009 CG_{62}	—	February 3, 2009	Kitt Peak	Spacewatch	·	3.5 km	MPC · JPL
343078	2009 CN_{63}	—	February 2, 2009	Kitt Peak	Spacewatch	·	4.3 km	MPC · JPL
343079	2009 CQ_{63}	—	February 3, 2009	Mount Lemmon	Mount Lemmon Survey	·	3.8 km	MPC · JPL
343080	2009 DH_{1}	—	February 17, 2009	Heppenheim	Starkenburg	KOR	1.6 km	MPC · JPL
343081	2009 DB_{4}	—	February 19, 2009	Socorro	LINEAR	EUP	4.4 km	MPC · JPL
343082	2009 DT_{5}	—	February 20, 2009	Magdalena Ridge	Ryan, W. H.	ELF	4.4 km	MPC · JPL
343083	2009 DD_{9}	—	February 19, 2009	Mount Lemmon	Mount Lemmon Survey	HYG	3.0 km	MPC · JPL
343084	2009 DQ_{9}	—	February 17, 2009	Socorro	LINEAR	·	2.0 km	MPC · JPL
343085	2009 DC_{13}	—	February 16, 2009	Kitt Peak	Spacewatch	·	2.5 km	MPC · JPL
343086	2009 DZ_{16}	—	February 18, 2009	La Sagra	OAM	EOS	4.8 km	MPC · JPL
343087	2009 DH_{17}	—	February 17, 2009	Kitt Peak	Spacewatch	EOS	2.8 km	MPC · JPL
343088	2009 DK_{17}	—	February 17, 2009	Kitt Peak	Spacewatch	·	4.4 km	MPC · JPL
343089	2009 DR_{17}	—	February 19, 2009	Mount Lemmon	Mount Lemmon Survey	·	2.6 km	MPC · JPL
343090	2009 DO_{19}	—	February 21, 2009	Catalina	CSS	·	2.3 km	MPC · JPL
343091	2009 DE_{23}	—	February 19, 2009	Kitt Peak	Spacewatch	·	3.2 km	MPC · JPL
343092	2009 DX_{31}	—	February 20, 2009	Kitt Peak	Spacewatch	·	3.2 km	MPC · JPL
343093	2009 DR_{35}	—	February 20, 2009	Kitt Peak	Spacewatch	·	2.7 km	MPC · JPL
343094	2009 DT_{37}	—	February 23, 2009	Calar Alto	F. Hormuth	HYG	2.5 km	MPC · JPL
343095	2009 DS_{40}	—	February 16, 2009	La Sagra	OAM	·	5.0 km	MPC · JPL
343096	2009 DH_{41}	—	February 18, 2009	La Sagra	OAM	HYG	3.3 km	MPC · JPL
343097	2009 DN_{41}	—	February 18, 2009	La Sagra	OAM	VER	3.4 km	MPC · JPL
343098	2009 DV_{42}	—	February 26, 2009	Catalina	CSS	AMO	660 m	MPC · JPL
343099	2009 DJ_{43}	—	February 25, 2009	Dauban	Kugel, F.	EUP	5.0 km	MPC · JPL
343100	2009 DE_{57}	—	February 22, 2009	Kitt Peak	Spacewatch	THM	3.0 km	MPC · JPL

== 343101–343200 ==
back to top

Designation			Discovery			Properties		Ref
Permanent	Provisional	Named after	Date	Site	Discoverer(s)	Category	Diam.	Ref
343101	2009 DD_{60}	—	February 22, 2009	Kitt Peak	Spacewatch	CYB	3.4 km	MPC · JPL
343102	2009 DV_{62}	—	February 22, 2009	Kitt Peak	Spacewatch	·	3.2 km	MPC · JPL
343103	2009 DJ_{63}	—	February 22, 2009	Kitt Peak	Spacewatch	·	1.9 km	MPC · JPL
343104	2009 DV_{64}	—	February 19, 2009	Kitt Peak	Spacewatch	·	2.8 km	MPC · JPL
343105	2009 DX_{64}	—	February 20, 2009	Mount Lemmon	Mount Lemmon Survey	·	2.1 km	MPC · JPL
343106	2009 DT_{69}	—	February 26, 2009	Catalina	CSS	·	2.9 km	MPC · JPL
343107	2009 DA_{75}	—	February 19, 2009	Kitt Peak	Spacewatch	·	2.7 km	MPC · JPL
343108	2009 DS_{101}	—	February 26, 2009	Kitt Peak	Spacewatch	VER	3.2 km	MPC · JPL
343109	2009 DV_{110}	—	February 22, 2009	Catalina	CSS	MAR	1.7 km	MPC · JPL
343110	2009 DV_{123}	—	February 16, 2009	Kitt Peak	Spacewatch	HYG	3.2 km	MPC · JPL
343111	2009 DZ_{125}	—	February 19, 2009	Kitt Peak	Spacewatch	THM	2.3 km	MPC · JPL
343112	2009 DL_{126}	—	February 20, 2009	Kitt Peak	Spacewatch	·	2.3 km	MPC · JPL
343113	2009 DB_{128}	—	February 21, 2009	Kitt Peak	Spacewatch	·	3.0 km	MPC · JPL
343114	2009 DC_{129}	—	February 26, 2009	Kitt Peak	Spacewatch	·	3.2 km	MPC · JPL
343115	2009 DR_{132}	—	February 21, 2009	Kitt Peak	Spacewatch	·	3.5 km	MPC · JPL
343116	2009 DU_{132}	—	February 26, 2009	Catalina	CSS	·	2.7 km	MPC · JPL
343117	2009 DF_{135}	—	February 28, 2009	Kitt Peak	Spacewatch	THM	3.2 km	MPC · JPL
343118	2009 DX_{136}	—	February 25, 2009	Siding Spring	SSS	EUP	4.8 km	MPC · JPL
343119	2009 EM_{3}	—	March 14, 2009	La Sagra	OAM	·	3.1 km	MPC · JPL
343120	2009 EN_{13}	—	March 15, 2009	Kitt Peak	Spacewatch	·	2.2 km	MPC · JPL
343121	2009 EW_{13}	—	March 15, 2009	Catalina	CSS	(159)	3.8 km	MPC · JPL
343122	2009 EH_{15}	—	March 15, 2009	Kitt Peak	Spacewatch	·	3.0 km	MPC · JPL
343123	2009 EV_{16}	—	March 15, 2009	Kitt Peak	Spacewatch	·	3.3 km	MPC · JPL
343124	2009 EA_{17}	—	March 15, 2009	Kitt Peak	Spacewatch	·	3.2 km	MPC · JPL
343125	2009 EE_{17}	—	March 15, 2009	Kitt Peak	Spacewatch	·	2.8 km	MPC · JPL
343126	2009 EQ_{19}	—	March 15, 2009	Mount Lemmon	Mount Lemmon Survey	·	2.5 km	MPC · JPL
343127	2009 EG_{21}	—	March 15, 2009	La Sagra	OAM	·	4.0 km	MPC · JPL
343128	2009 EV_{21}	—	March 14, 2009	La Sagra	OAM	LIX	4.2 km	MPC · JPL
343129	2009 ER_{26}	—	March 4, 2009	Siding Spring	SSS	CYB	6.7 km	MPC · JPL
343130	2009 EU_{29}	—	March 7, 2009	Mount Lemmon	Mount Lemmon Survey	·	6.8 km	MPC · JPL
343131	2009 EM_{30}	—	March 6, 2009	Siding Spring	SSS	·	5.4 km	MPC · JPL
343132	2009 FV	—	March 16, 2009	La Sagra	OAM	(159)	3.9 km	MPC · JPL
343133	2009 FY_{1}	—	March 17, 2009	Taunus	Karge, S., R. Kling	·	4.0 km	MPC · JPL
343134 Bizet	2009 FG_{5}	Bizet	March 19, 2009	Saint-Sulpice	B. Christophe	·	3.1 km	MPC · JPL
343135	2009 FS_{13}	—	March 16, 2009	Dauban	Kugel, F.	·	3.7 km	MPC · JPL
343136	2009 FF_{24}	—	March 20, 2009	La Sagra	OAM	·	3.0 km	MPC · JPL
343137	2009 FA_{25}	—	March 22, 2009	La Sagra	OAM	·	3.7 km	MPC · JPL
343138	2009 FG_{32}	—	March 28, 2009	Tzec Maun	E. Schwab	·	3.4 km	MPC · JPL
343139	2009 FE_{34}	—	March 21, 2009	Catalina	CSS	·	4.7 km	MPC · JPL
343140	2009 FL_{35}	—	March 21, 2009	Catalina	CSS	·	4.2 km	MPC · JPL
343141	2009 FB_{37}	—	March 23, 2009	Purple Mountain	PMO NEO Survey Program	·	3.1 km	MPC · JPL
343142	2009 FE_{40}	—	March 28, 2009	Kitt Peak	Spacewatch	·	2.5 km	MPC · JPL
343143	2009 FP_{41}	—	March 23, 2009	Purple Mountain	PMO NEO Survey Program	·	4.5 km	MPC · JPL
343144	2009 FG_{42}	—	March 28, 2009	Kitt Peak	Spacewatch	·	3.6 km	MPC · JPL
343145	2009 FO_{42}	—	March 28, 2009	Kitt Peak	Spacewatch	·	4.0 km	MPC · JPL
343146	2009 FF_{55}	—	March 31, 2009	Kitt Peak	Spacewatch	·	2.3 km	MPC · JPL
343147	2009 FU_{67}	—	March 22, 2009	Mount Lemmon	Mount Lemmon Survey	·	3.4 km	MPC · JPL
343148	2009 FF_{69}	—	March 16, 2009	Kitt Peak	Spacewatch	CYB	5.5 km	MPC · JPL
343149	2009 FC_{73}	—	March 21, 2009	Catalina	CSS	HYG	3.1 km	MPC · JPL
343150	2009 FX_{73}	—	March 29, 2009	Catalina	CSS	·	3.1 km	MPC · JPL
343151	2009 FR_{76}	—	March 18, 2009	Kitt Peak	Spacewatch	CYB	4.2 km	MPC · JPL
343152	2009 FV_{76}	—	March 16, 2009	Catalina	CSS	·	3.8 km	MPC · JPL
343153	2009 HY_{15}	—	April 18, 2009	Kitt Peak	Spacewatch	·	3.7 km	MPC · JPL
343154	2009 HN_{18}	—	April 19, 2009	Kitt Peak	Spacewatch	·	3.3 km	MPC · JPL
343155	2009 HY_{39}	—	October 22, 2006	Mount Lemmon	Mount Lemmon Survey	·	3.4 km	MPC · JPL
343156	2009 HP_{66}	—	April 24, 2009	Kitt Peak	Spacewatch	·	2.6 km	MPC · JPL
343157 Mindaugas	2009 HH_{68}	Mindaugas	April 25, 2009	Baldone	K. Černis, I. Eglītis	·	3.4 km	MPC · JPL
343158 Marsyas	2009 HC_{82}	Marsyas	April 29, 2009	Catalina	CSS	T_{j} (1.32) · APO +1km	1.9 km	MPC · JPL
343159	2009 JD_{17}	—	May 13, 2009	Kitt Peak	Spacewatch	L5	10 km	MPC · JPL
343160	2009 KS_{2}	—	May 19, 2009	Dauban	Kugel, F.	3:2	7.2 km	MPC · JPL
343161	2009 KH_{3}	—	May 22, 2009	Marly	P. Kocher	L5	10 km	MPC · JPL
343162	2009 PY_{4}	—	December 18, 2007	Mount Lemmon	Mount Lemmon Survey	·	1.3 km	MPC · JPL
343163	2009 QA	—	August 16, 2009	Catalina	CSS	H	700 m	MPC · JPL
343164	2009 QQ_{48}	—	March 16, 2005	Mount Lemmon	Mount Lemmon Survey	·	1.4 km	MPC · JPL
343165	2009 SK_{102}	—	September 25, 2009	Catalina	CSS	H	780 m	MPC · JPL
343166	2009 SO_{103}	—	September 25, 2009	Socorro	LINEAR	APO +1km	670 m	MPC · JPL
343167	2009 SW_{125}	—	September 18, 2009	Kitt Peak	Spacewatch	·	800 m	MPC · JPL
343168	2009 SU_{158}	—	September 20, 2009	Kitt Peak	Spacewatch	·	810 m	MPC · JPL
343169	2009 SW_{192}	—	September 22, 2009	Kitt Peak	Spacewatch	·	710 m	MPC · JPL
343170	2009 SC_{199}	—	February 2, 2008	Mount Lemmon	Mount Lemmon Survey	·	830 m	MPC · JPL
343171	2009 SQ_{208}	—	September 23, 2009	Kitt Peak	Spacewatch	·	590 m	MPC · JPL
343172	2009 SX_{283}	—	September 25, 2009	Kitt Peak	Spacewatch	·	730 m	MPC · JPL
343173	2009 SQ_{326}	—	September 30, 2009	Mount Lemmon	Mount Lemmon Survey	·	770 m	MPC · JPL
343174	2009 SH_{333}	—	September 25, 2009	Catalina	CSS	L4	17 km	MPC · JPL
343175	2009 ST_{338}	—	September 22, 2009	Mount Lemmon	Mount Lemmon Survey	·	770 m	MPC · JPL
343176	2009 SZ_{339}	—	September 30, 2009	Mount Lemmon	Mount Lemmon Survey	·	1.2 km	MPC · JPL
343177	2009 TB_{25}	—	October 14, 2009	Catalina	CSS	PHO	1.1 km	MPC · JPL
343178	2009 TG_{36}	—	October 14, 2009	Catalina	CSS	·	930 m	MPC · JPL
343179	2009 UC_{58}	—	October 23, 2009	Mount Lemmon	Mount Lemmon Survey	·	630 m	MPC · JPL
343180	2009 UZ_{70}	—	October 22, 2009	Catalina	CSS	·	770 m	MPC · JPL
343181	2009 UB_{84}	—	October 23, 2009	Mount Lemmon	Mount Lemmon Survey	·	1.2 km	MPC · JPL
343182	2009 UD_{85}	—	October 23, 2009	Mount Lemmon	Mount Lemmon Survey	·	610 m	MPC · JPL
343183	2009 UU_{88}	—	October 22, 2009	Catalina	CSS	·	670 m	MPC · JPL
343184	2009 UH_{96}	—	October 22, 2009	Mount Lemmon	Mount Lemmon Survey	·	1.7 km	MPC · JPL
343185	2009 UV_{102}	—	October 24, 2009	Catalina	CSS	·	1.6 km	MPC · JPL
343186	2009 UG_{111}	—	October 23, 2009	Kitt Peak	Spacewatch	V	690 m	MPC · JPL
343187	2009 UO_{116}	—	October 22, 2009	Mount Lemmon	Mount Lemmon Survey	·	910 m	MPC · JPL
343188	2009 UT_{144}	—	October 24, 2009	Catalina	CSS	·	930 m	MPC · JPL
343189	2009 UO_{146}	—	October 16, 2009	Mount Lemmon	Mount Lemmon Survey	HOF	2.1 km	MPC · JPL
343190	2009 UE_{148}	—	April 14, 2008	Catalina	CSS	·	940 m	MPC · JPL
343191	2009 UF_{154}	—	October 26, 2009	Mount Lemmon	Mount Lemmon Survey	V	770 m	MPC · JPL
343192	2009 VK_{15}	—	September 5, 1999	Catalina	CSS	·	790 m	MPC · JPL
343193	2009 VU_{19}	—	October 24, 2009	Kitt Peak	Spacewatch	·	680 m	MPC · JPL
343194	2009 VY_{20}	—	November 9, 2009	Mount Lemmon	Mount Lemmon Survey	·	1.3 km	MPC · JPL
343195	2009 VT_{32}	—	February 12, 2000	Apache Point	SDSS	V	740 m	MPC · JPL
343196	2009 VG_{33}	—	November 10, 2009	Mount Lemmon	Mount Lemmon Survey	·	920 m	MPC · JPL
343197	2009 VF_{37}	—	November 8, 2009	Kitt Peak	Spacewatch	·	690 m	MPC · JPL
343198	2009 VU_{37}	—	November 8, 2009	Catalina	CSS	·	770 m	MPC · JPL
343199	2009 VJ_{47}	—	November 9, 2009	Mount Lemmon	Mount Lemmon Survey	·	980 m	MPC · JPL
343200	2009 VF_{55}	—	November 11, 2009	Kitt Peak	Spacewatch	V	580 m	MPC · JPL

== 343201–343300 ==
back to top

Designation			Discovery			Properties		Ref
Permanent	Provisional	Named after	Date	Site	Discoverer(s)	Category	Diam.	Ref
343201	2009 VE_{61}	—	November 8, 2009	Kitt Peak	Spacewatch	·	1.1 km	MPC · JPL
343202	2009 VH_{67}	—	November 9, 2009	Kitt Peak	Spacewatch	·	810 m	MPC · JPL
343203	2009 VZ_{71}	—	November 11, 2009	Kitt Peak	Spacewatch	·	640 m	MPC · JPL
343204	2009 VW_{93}	—	November 15, 2009	Catalina	CSS	·	720 m	MPC · JPL
343205	2009 VQ_{94}	—	January 10, 2007	Kitt Peak	Spacewatch	·	670 m	MPC · JPL
343206	2009 VC_{100}	—	November 9, 2009	Mount Lemmon	Mount Lemmon Survey	·	990 m	MPC · JPL
343207	2009 VR_{105}	—	November 15, 2009	Catalina	CSS	·	1.4 km	MPC · JPL
343208	2009 VG_{108}	—	November 8, 2009	Mount Lemmon	Mount Lemmon Survey	·	1.4 km	MPC · JPL
343209	2009 VT_{114}	—	November 11, 2009	Mount Lemmon	Mount Lemmon Survey	·	960 m	MPC · JPL
343210	2009 WG_{1}	—	November 18, 2009	Mayhill	Lowe, A.	·	630 m	MPC · JPL
343211	2009 WV_{20}	—	November 17, 2009	Catalina	CSS	·	1.6 km	MPC · JPL
343212	2009 WK_{27}	—	November 16, 2009	Kitt Peak	Spacewatch	·	820 m	MPC · JPL
343213	2009 WD_{28}	—	November 16, 2009	Kitt Peak	Spacewatch	·	720 m	MPC · JPL
343214	2009 WG_{34}	—	November 8, 2009	Kitt Peak	Spacewatch	VER	3.4 km	MPC · JPL
343215	2009 WX_{36}	—	November 17, 2009	Kitt Peak	Spacewatch	·	1.3 km	MPC · JPL
343216	2009 WC_{37}	—	November 17, 2009	Kitt Peak	Spacewatch	·	760 m	MPC · JPL
343217	2009 WL_{37}	—	November 17, 2009	Kitt Peak	Spacewatch	·	1.4 km	MPC · JPL
343218	2009 WR_{37}	—	November 17, 2009	Kitt Peak	Spacewatch	·	820 m	MPC · JPL
343219	2009 WW_{43}	—	November 17, 2009	Mount Lemmon	Mount Lemmon Survey	·	1.7 km	MPC · JPL
343220	2009 WF_{44}	—	November 18, 2009	Kitt Peak	Spacewatch	·	740 m	MPC · JPL
343221	2009 WN_{45}	—	November 18, 2009	Kitt Peak	Spacewatch	·	680 m	MPC · JPL
343222	2009 WD_{80}	—	November 18, 2009	Kitt Peak	Spacewatch	·	940 m	MPC · JPL
343223	2009 WD_{82}	—	November 19, 2009	Kitt Peak	Spacewatch	·	940 m	MPC · JPL
343224	2009 WO_{82}	—	November 19, 2009	Kitt Peak	Spacewatch	·	740 m	MPC · JPL
343225	2009 WX_{83}	—	November 19, 2009	Kitt Peak	Spacewatch	·	970 m	MPC · JPL
343226	2009 WW_{84}	—	November 19, 2009	Kitt Peak	Spacewatch	·	1.4 km	MPC · JPL
343227	2009 WA_{88}	—	November 19, 2009	Kitt Peak	Spacewatch	·	810 m	MPC · JPL
343228	2009 WK_{88}	—	November 19, 2009	Kitt Peak	Spacewatch	·	920 m	MPC · JPL
343229	2009 WN_{89}	—	November 19, 2009	Kitt Peak	Spacewatch	·	1.6 km	MPC · JPL
343230 Corsini	2009 WZ_{105}	Corsini	November 22, 2009	Magasa	Tonincelli, M., Zanardini, F.	·	1.5 km	MPC · JPL
343231	2009 WS_{119}	—	November 19, 2006	Kitt Peak	Spacewatch	·	1.2 km	MPC · JPL
343232	2009 WA_{121}	—	November 20, 2009	Kitt Peak	Spacewatch	·	690 m	MPC · JPL
343233	2009 WV_{123}	—	November 20, 2009	Kitt Peak	Spacewatch	·	1.7 km	MPC · JPL
343234	2009 WP_{128}	—	November 20, 2009	Mount Lemmon	Mount Lemmon Survey	·	780 m	MPC · JPL
343235	2009 WK_{130}	—	November 20, 2009	Mount Lemmon	Mount Lemmon Survey	·	830 m	MPC · JPL
343236	2009 WZ_{132}	—	September 19, 2009	Mount Lemmon	Mount Lemmon Survey	·	840 m	MPC · JPL
343237	2009 WL_{137}	—	November 23, 2009	Mount Lemmon	Mount Lemmon Survey	·	730 m	MPC · JPL
343238	2009 WX_{162}	—	November 21, 2009	Kitt Peak	Spacewatch	·	770 m	MPC · JPL
343239	2009 WY_{184}	—	November 16, 2009	Mount Lemmon	Mount Lemmon Survey	·	920 m	MPC · JPL
343240	2009 WB_{189}	—	November 24, 2009	Kitt Peak	Spacewatch	·	710 m	MPC · JPL
343241	2009 WW_{192}	—	November 24, 2009	Mount Lemmon	Mount Lemmon Survey	·	800 m	MPC · JPL
343242	2009 WM_{195}	—	November 25, 2009	Kitt Peak	Spacewatch	·	670 m	MPC · JPL
343243	2009 WX_{200}	—	November 26, 2009	Mount Lemmon	Mount Lemmon Survey	·	600 m	MPC · JPL
343244	2009 WP_{209}	—	November 17, 2009	Kitt Peak	Spacewatch	·	730 m	MPC · JPL
343245	2009 WF_{216}	—	September 22, 2009	Mount Lemmon	Mount Lemmon Survey	·	750 m	MPC · JPL
343246	2009 WN_{218}	—	November 16, 2009	Kitt Peak	Spacewatch	·	930 m	MPC · JPL
343247	2009 WE_{241}	—	November 18, 2009	Kitt Peak	Spacewatch	·	690 m	MPC · JPL
343248	2009 WV_{261}	—	November 17, 2009	Kitt Peak	Spacewatch	·	1.0 km	MPC · JPL
343249	2009 XL_{7}	—	December 13, 2009	Hibiscus	Teamo, N.	·	1.7 km	MPC · JPL
343250	2009 XV_{8}	—	October 1, 2005	Mount Lemmon	Mount Lemmon Survey	V	740 m	MPC · JPL
343251	2009 XH_{9}	—	December 12, 2009	Mayhill	Nevski, V.	·	680 m	MPC · JPL
343252	2009 XL_{15}	—	December 15, 2009	Mount Lemmon	Mount Lemmon Survey	·	870 m	MPC · JPL
343253	2009 XD_{17}	—	November 16, 2009	Mount Lemmon	Mount Lemmon Survey	·	1.6 km	MPC · JPL
343254	2009 XU_{17}	—	December 15, 2009	Mount Lemmon	Mount Lemmon Survey	MAS	750 m	MPC · JPL
343255	2009 XK_{21}	—	December 10, 2009	Mount Lemmon	Mount Lemmon Survey	·	1.5 km	MPC · JPL
343256	2009 XN_{22}	—	December 15, 2009	Mount Lemmon	Mount Lemmon Survey	·	570 m	MPC · JPL
343257	2009 XO_{22}	—	December 15, 2009	Mount Lemmon	Mount Lemmon Survey	·	1.4 km	MPC · JPL
343258	2009 XC_{25}	—	December 13, 2009	Socorro	LINEAR	·	1.9 km	MPC · JPL
343259	2009 YZ_{5}	—	December 17, 2009	Mount Lemmon	Mount Lemmon Survey	·	2.7 km	MPC · JPL
343260	2009 YW_{14}	—	December 18, 2009	Mount Lemmon	Mount Lemmon Survey	·	2.5 km	MPC · JPL
343261	2009 YP_{15}	—	November 8, 2009	Kitt Peak	Spacewatch	·	930 m	MPC · JPL
343262	2009 YC_{20}	—	December 26, 2009	Kitt Peak	Spacewatch	·	1.7 km	MPC · JPL
343263	2009 YU_{21}	—	December 28, 2009	Purple Mountain	PMO NEO Survey Program	·	2.1 km	MPC · JPL
343264	2009 YZ_{21}	—	December 26, 2009	Kitt Peak	Spacewatch	PHO	4.1 km	MPC · JPL
343265	2009 YZ_{23}	—	December 19, 2009	Mount Lemmon	Mount Lemmon Survey	V	740 m	MPC · JPL
343266	2009 YK_{24}	—	December 17, 2009	Mount Lemmon	Mount Lemmon Survey	·	1.4 km	MPC · JPL
343267	2009 YO_{24}	—	December 18, 2009	Kitt Peak	Spacewatch	·	660 m	MPC · JPL
343268	2009 YX_{24}	—	December 19, 2009	Mount Lemmon	Mount Lemmon Survey	MAR	1.3 km	MPC · JPL
343269	2009 YP_{25}	—	December 20, 2009	Mount Lemmon	Mount Lemmon Survey	·	2.8 km	MPC · JPL
343270	2010 AE_{1}	—	January 5, 2010	Kitt Peak	Spacewatch	MAS	740 m	MPC · JPL
343271	2010 AS_{6}	—	January 6, 2010	Vail-Jarnac	Jarnac	·	1.5 km	MPC · JPL
343272	2010 AG_{9}	—	January 6, 2010	Catalina	CSS	NYS	1.1 km	MPC · JPL
343273	2010 AH_{12}	—	October 3, 2005	Catalina	CSS	·	810 m	MPC · JPL
343274	2010 AL_{17}	—	January 7, 2010	Mount Lemmon	Mount Lemmon Survey	·	1.4 km	MPC · JPL
343275	2010 AC_{25}	—	January 6, 2010	Kitt Peak	Spacewatch	·	2.3 km	MPC · JPL
343276	2010 AW_{25}	—	January 6, 2010	Kitt Peak	Spacewatch	·	6.2 km	MPC · JPL
343277	2010 AQ_{31}	—	January 6, 2010	Kitt Peak	Spacewatch	·	1.3 km	MPC · JPL
343278	2010 AC_{34}	—	January 7, 2010	Kitt Peak	Spacewatch	·	4.0 km	MPC · JPL
343279	2010 AH_{35}	—	January 7, 2010	Kitt Peak	Spacewatch	·	1.3 km	MPC · JPL
343280	2010 AQ_{37}	—	October 7, 2008	Mount Lemmon	Mount Lemmon Survey	·	1.9 km	MPC · JPL
343281	2010 AF_{38}	—	January 7, 2010	Kitt Peak	Spacewatch	NYS	1.4 km	MPC · JPL
343282	2010 AX_{40}	—	January 5, 2010	Kitt Peak	Spacewatch	·	2.3 km	MPC · JPL
343283	2010 AW_{41}	—	January 6, 2010	Catalina	CSS	·	1.4 km	MPC · JPL
343284	2010 AE_{43}	—	January 6, 2010	Mount Lemmon	Mount Lemmon Survey	·	2.1 km	MPC · JPL
343285	2010 AT_{43}	—	January 6, 2010	Kitt Peak	Spacewatch	NYS	1.4 km	MPC · JPL
343286	2010 AA_{44}	—	January 6, 2010	Kitt Peak	Spacewatch	TIR	3.1 km	MPC · JPL
343287	2010 AL_{45}	—	January 7, 2010	Mount Lemmon	Mount Lemmon Survey	KON	3.0 km	MPC · JPL
343288	2010 AV_{54}	—	January 8, 2010	Kitt Peak	Spacewatch	NYS	2.1 km	MPC · JPL
343289	2010 AG_{63}	—	January 8, 2010	Mount Lemmon	Mount Lemmon Survey	·	710 m	MPC · JPL
343290	2010 AU_{63}	—	January 8, 2010	Kitt Peak	Spacewatch	·	2.2 km	MPC · JPL
343291	2010 AD_{67}	—	November 20, 2006	Mount Lemmon	Mount Lemmon Survey	·	1.4 km	MPC · JPL
343292	2010 AE_{67}	—	January 12, 2010	Kitt Peak	Spacewatch	·	930 m	MPC · JPL
343293	2010 AB_{68}	—	January 12, 2010	Kitt Peak	Spacewatch	·	1.5 km	MPC · JPL
343294	2010 AK_{68}	—	January 12, 2010	Kitt Peak	Spacewatch	·	1.9 km	MPC · JPL
343295	2010 AG_{70}	—	September 29, 2001	Palomar	NEAT	·	1.7 km	MPC · JPL
343296	2010 AO_{70}	—	September 24, 1995	Kitt Peak	Spacewatch	·	870 m	MPC · JPL
343297	2010 AN_{73}	—	January 14, 2010	Kitt Peak	Spacewatch	·	910 m	MPC · JPL
343298	2010 AN_{76}	—	January 12, 2010	Catalina	CSS	·	1.9 km	MPC · JPL
343299	2010 AC_{77}	—	January 7, 2010	Mount Lemmon	Mount Lemmon Survey	V	1.0 km	MPC · JPL
343300	2010 AD_{77}	—	January 8, 2010	Kitt Peak	Spacewatch	ADE	2.1 km	MPC · JPL

== 343301–343400 ==
back to top

Designation			Discovery			Properties		Ref
Permanent	Provisional	Named after	Date	Site	Discoverer(s)	Category	Diam.	Ref
343301	2010 AR_{81}	—	January 8, 2010	WISE	WISE	·	5.1 km	MPC · JPL
343302	2010 AE_{89}	—	January 8, 2010	WISE	WISE	HOF	3.5 km	MPC · JPL
343303	2010 AO_{95}	—	January 9, 2010	WISE	WISE	·	3.8 km	MPC · JPL
343304	2010 AC_{106}	—	November 7, 2008	Mount Lemmon	Mount Lemmon Survey	·	2.5 km	MPC · JPL
343305	2010 AJ_{110}	—	April 6, 2010	Mount Lemmon	Mount Lemmon Survey	·	4.5 km	MPC · JPL
343306	2010 AG_{115}	—	January 13, 2010	WISE	WISE	·	4.9 km	MPC · JPL
343307	2010 AQ_{120}	—	January 14, 2010	WISE	WISE	·	5.6 km	MPC · JPL
343308	2010 BN_{3}	—	January 16, 2010	Nyukasa	Nyukasa	·	1.6 km	MPC · JPL
343309	2010 BZ_{3}	—	January 21, 2010	Bisei SG Center	BATTeRS	·	710 m	MPC · JPL
343310	2010 BD_{5}	—	January 23, 2010	Bisei SG Center	BATTeRS	·	3.5 km	MPC · JPL
343311	2010 BM_{6}	—	January 17, 2010	Kitt Peak	Spacewatch	MAS	950 m	MPC · JPL
343312	2010 BH_{28}	—	January 18, 2010	WISE	WISE	·	4.5 km	MPC · JPL
343313	2010 BX_{40}	—	January 19, 2010	WISE	WISE	EMA	3.9 km	MPC · JPL
343314	2010 BC_{57}	—	January 21, 2010	WISE	WISE	·	5.2 km	MPC · JPL
343315	2010 BK_{61}	—	January 21, 2010	WISE	WISE	·	4.2 km	MPC · JPL
343316	2010 BU_{68}	—	March 18, 2010	Kitt Peak	Spacewatch	·	4.1 km	MPC · JPL
343317	2010 BV_{71}	—	January 23, 2010	WISE	WISE	·	5.3 km	MPC · JPL
343318	2010 BS_{73}	—	January 23, 2010	WISE	WISE	·	3.8 km	MPC · JPL
343319	2010 BD_{76}	—	January 24, 2010	WISE	WISE	HOF	2.9 km	MPC · JPL
343320	2010 BF_{84}	—	May 19, 2005	Mount Lemmon	Mount Lemmon Survey	CYB	5.5 km	MPC · JPL
343321	2010 BM_{96}	—	March 16, 2004	Socorro	LINEAR	·	2.0 km	MPC · JPL
343322 Tomskuniver	2010 CK	Tomskuniver	February 6, 2010	Zelenchukskaya Stn110639	T. V. Krjačko	·	3.2 km	MPC · JPL
343323	2010 CP_{1}	—	February 8, 2010	Tzec Maun	E. Schwab	V	750 m	MPC · JPL
343324	2010 CE_{3}	—	February 5, 2010	Kitt Peak	Spacewatch	·	1.3 km	MPC · JPL
343325	2010 CS_{3}	—	February 5, 2010	Kitt Peak	Spacewatch	·	1.4 km	MPC · JPL
343326	2010 CK_{6}	—	January 18, 2009	Kitt Peak	Spacewatch	·	5.8 km	MPC · JPL
343327	2010 CL_{8}	—	February 7, 2010	WISE	WISE	·	2.3 km	MPC · JPL
343328	2010 CH_{9}	—	February 8, 2010	WISE	WISE	·	3.8 km	MPC · JPL
343329	2010 CB_{14}	—	February 10, 2010	WISE	WISE	·	5.2 km	MPC · JPL
343330	2010 CH_{17}	—	February 11, 2010	WISE	WISE	·	1.9 km	MPC · JPL
343331	2010 CY_{19}	—	December 30, 2005	Mount Lemmon	Mount Lemmon Survey	·	1.7 km	MPC · JPL
343332	2010 CP_{22}	—	February 9, 2010	Kitt Peak	Spacewatch	·	1.8 km	MPC · JPL
343333	2010 CA_{29}	—	February 9, 2010	Kitt Peak	Spacewatch	·	1.3 km	MPC · JPL
343334	2010 CE_{32}	—	February 9, 2010	Kitt Peak	Spacewatch	·	2.1 km	MPC · JPL
343335	2010 CN_{32}	—	February 9, 2010	Kitt Peak	Spacewatch	·	5.5 km	MPC · JPL
343336	2010 CJ_{35}	—	February 10, 2010	Kitt Peak	Spacewatch	·	1.5 km	MPC · JPL
343337	2010 CY_{35}	—	February 10, 2010	Kitt Peak	Spacewatch	EOS	2.5 km	MPC · JPL
343338	2010 CH_{36}	—	February 10, 2010	Kitt Peak	Spacewatch	·	2.1 km	MPC · JPL
343339	2010 CO_{39}	—	February 13, 2010	Kitt Peak	Spacewatch	·	1.2 km	MPC · JPL
343340	2010 CE_{41}	—	February 5, 2010	Catalina	CSS	NYS	1.4 km	MPC · JPL
343341	2010 CE_{42}	—	February 6, 2010	Mount Lemmon	Mount Lemmon Survey	·	2.2 km	MPC · JPL
343342	2010 CK_{42}	—	February 6, 2010	Mount Lemmon	Mount Lemmon Survey	MAS	850 m	MPC · JPL
343343	2010 CJ_{48}	—	February 12, 2010	WISE	WISE	·	4.0 km	MPC · JPL
343344	2010 CX_{55}	—	November 1, 1997	Kitt Peak	Spacewatch	·	1.5 km	MPC · JPL
343345	2010 CQ_{56}	—	January 28, 2006	Catalina	CSS	·	3.6 km	MPC · JPL
343346	2010 CF_{57}	—	February 14, 2010	Socorro	LINEAR	·	2.6 km	MPC · JPL
343347	2010 CF_{59}	—	February 14, 2010	Socorro	LINEAR	EUN	1.3 km	MPC · JPL
343348	2010 CR_{59}	—	February 14, 2010	Socorro	LINEAR	HNS	1.6 km	MPC · JPL
343349	2010 CK_{60}	—	February 14, 2010	Socorro	LINEAR	KON	3.1 km	MPC · JPL
343350	2010 CL_{60}	—	February 14, 2010	Socorro	LINEAR	·	1.6 km	MPC · JPL
343351	2010 CS_{61}	—	February 9, 2010	Kitt Peak	Spacewatch	·	3.6 km	MPC · JPL
343352	2010 CR_{62}	—	February 9, 2010	Kitt Peak	Spacewatch	·	3.3 km	MPC · JPL
343353	2010 CG_{63}	—	February 9, 2010	Kitt Peak	Spacewatch	·	1.0 km	MPC · JPL
343354	2010 CU_{66}	—	February 10, 2010	Kitt Peak	Spacewatch	·	2.9 km	MPC · JPL
343355	2010 CL_{68}	—	February 10, 2010	Kitt Peak	Spacewatch	·	2.1 km	MPC · JPL
343356	2010 CE_{75}	—	February 24, 2006	Mount Lemmon	Mount Lemmon Survey	·	1.6 km	MPC · JPL
343357	2010 CL_{75}	—	February 13, 2010	Mount Lemmon	Mount Lemmon Survey	·	1.2 km	MPC · JPL
343358	2010 CE_{79}	—	February 13, 2010	Mount Lemmon	Mount Lemmon Survey	·	1.5 km	MPC · JPL
343359	2010 CY_{79}	—	January 5, 2006	Catalina	CSS	·	1.4 km	MPC · JPL
343360	2010 CC_{80}	—	February 13, 2010	Mount Lemmon	Mount Lemmon Survey	(5651)	5.0 km	MPC · JPL
343361	2010 CR_{81}	—	January 16, 2005	Kitt Peak	Spacewatch	HOF	3.6 km	MPC · JPL
343362	2010 CS_{81}	—	February 13, 2010	Mount Lemmon	Mount Lemmon Survey	·	4.8 km	MPC · JPL
343363	2010 CK_{82}	—	March 9, 2005	Mount Lemmon	Mount Lemmon Survey	KOR	1.5 km	MPC · JPL
343364	2010 CZ_{83}	—	February 14, 2010	Kitt Peak	Spacewatch	MAS	780 m	MPC · JPL
343365	2010 CE_{84}	—	February 14, 2010	Kitt Peak	Spacewatch	·	1.9 km	MPC · JPL
343366	2010 CG_{87}	—	September 26, 2003	Apache Point	SDSS	·	1.9 km	MPC · JPL
343367	2010 CY_{88}	—	February 14, 2010	Mount Lemmon	Mount Lemmon Survey	MRX	1.2 km	MPC · JPL
343368	2010 CH_{91}	—	October 9, 2001	Kitt Peak	Spacewatch	NYS	1.1 km	MPC · JPL
343369	2010 CU_{93}	—	February 14, 2010	Kitt Peak	Spacewatch	·	1.1 km	MPC · JPL
343370	2010 CS_{94}	—	February 14, 2010	Kitt Peak	Spacewatch	·	1.9 km	MPC · JPL
343371	2010 CH_{95}	—	February 14, 2010	Kitt Peak	Spacewatch	·	2.8 km	MPC · JPL
343372	2010 CN_{96}	—	February 14, 2010	Mount Lemmon	Mount Lemmon Survey	AST	3.1 km	MPC · JPL
343373	2010 CC_{108}	—	February 14, 2010	Kitt Peak	Spacewatch	·	4.5 km	MPC · JPL
343374	2010 CV_{108}	—	February 14, 2010	Mount Lemmon	Mount Lemmon Survey	·	2.3 km	MPC · JPL
343375	2010 CF_{117}	—	February 14, 2010	Kitt Peak	Spacewatch	EOS	2.2 km	MPC · JPL
343376	2010 CD_{122}	—	February 15, 2010	Kitt Peak	Spacewatch	·	3.8 km	MPC · JPL
343377	2010 CH_{125}	—	October 4, 1999	Kitt Peak	Spacewatch	·	1.9 km	MPC · JPL
343378	2010 CN_{127}	—	February 15, 2010	Kitt Peak	Spacewatch	·	2.4 km	MPC · JPL
343379	2010 CO_{129}	—	February 13, 2010	Catalina	CSS	·	2.3 km	MPC · JPL
343380	2010 CE_{133}	—	February 12, 2010	WISE	WISE	·	4.8 km	MPC · JPL
343381	2010 CW_{135}	—	February 14, 2010	WISE	WISE	EOS	4.1 km	MPC · JPL
343382	2010 CK_{138}	—	February 13, 2010	Catalina	CSS	NYS	1.1 km	MPC · JPL
343383	2010 CQ_{139}	—	February 14, 2010	Mount Lemmon	Mount Lemmon Survey	·	820 m	MPC · JPL
343384	2010 CH_{141}	—	September 8, 1999	Kitt Peak	Spacewatch	·	1.8 km	MPC · JPL
343385	2010 CA_{142}	—	February 5, 2010	Catalina	CSS	(2076)	960 m	MPC · JPL
343386	2010 CA_{148}	—	February 13, 2010	Mount Lemmon	Mount Lemmon Survey	·	2.1 km	MPC · JPL
343387	2010 CA_{149}	—	October 22, 1998	Caussols	ODAS	·	1.0 km	MPC · JPL
343388	2010 CN_{149}	—	December 2, 1994	Kitt Peak	Spacewatch	·	2.0 km	MPC · JPL
343389	2010 CZ_{152}	—	February 14, 2010	Mount Lemmon	Mount Lemmon Survey	·	2.7 km	MPC · JPL
343390	2010 CN_{153}	—	February 14, 2010	Kitt Peak	Spacewatch	·	2.2 km	MPC · JPL
343391	2010 CR_{153}	—	February 14, 2010	Kitt Peak	Spacewatch	·	990 m	MPC · JPL
343392	2010 CZ_{154}	—	January 16, 2003	Palomar	NEAT	·	680 m	MPC · JPL
343393	2010 CE_{156}	—	February 15, 2010	Kitt Peak	Spacewatch	DOR	2.5 km	MPC · JPL
343394	2010 CU_{161}	—	February 6, 2010	Kitt Peak	Spacewatch	·	4.7 km	MPC · JPL
343395	2010 CR_{163}	—	February 9, 2010	Kitt Peak	Spacewatch	·	2.4 km	MPC · JPL
343396	2010 CH_{164}	—	March 27, 2003	Kitt Peak	Spacewatch	MAS	860 m	MPC · JPL
343397	2010 CN_{166}	—	February 13, 2010	Kitt Peak	Spacewatch	·	1.5 km	MPC · JPL
343398	2010 CO_{168}	—	February 15, 2010	Kitt Peak	Spacewatch	EOS	2.0 km	MPC · JPL
343399	2010 CE_{170}	—	February 14, 2004	Wrightwood	J. W. Young	·	4.0 km	MPC · JPL
343400	2010 CN_{170}	—	February 10, 2010	Kitt Peak	Spacewatch	·	1.5 km	MPC · JPL

== 343401–343500 ==
back to top

Designation			Discovery			Properties		Ref
Permanent	Provisional	Named after	Date	Site	Discoverer(s)	Category	Diam.	Ref
343401	2010 CR_{170}	—	February 13, 2010	Kitt Peak	Spacewatch	·	2.1 km	MPC · JPL
343402	2010 CV_{170}	—	February 13, 2010	Mount Lemmon	Mount Lemmon Survey	WIT	1.1 km	MPC · JPL
343403	2010 CY_{170}	—	September 21, 2003	Kitt Peak	Spacewatch	·	3.2 km	MPC · JPL
343404	2010 CC_{172}	—	October 24, 2005	Mauna Kea	A. Boattini	·	1.4 km	MPC · JPL
343405	2010 CL_{172}	—	February 15, 2010	Kitt Peak	Spacewatch	·	2.4 km	MPC · JPL
343406	2010 CB_{175}	—	February 9, 2010	Kitt Peak	Spacewatch	·	2.9 km	MPC · JPL
343407	2010 CR_{175}	—	February 9, 2010	Kitt Peak	Spacewatch	NYS	1.1 km	MPC · JPL
343408	2010 CO_{176}	—	September 18, 2003	Kitt Peak	Spacewatch	·	2.1 km	MPC · JPL
343409	2010 CY_{176}	—	February 10, 2010	Kitt Peak	Spacewatch	ADE	3.7 km	MPC · JPL
343410	2010 CT_{180}	—	February 10, 2010	Kitt Peak	Spacewatch	·	3.8 km	MPC · JPL
343411	2010 CU_{180}	—	February 10, 2010	Kitt Peak	Spacewatch	·	2.4 km	MPC · JPL
343412 de Boer	2010 CC_{181}	de Boer	February 13, 2010	Haleakala	Pan-STARRS 1	·	3.3 km	MPC · JPL
343413 Lauratoyama	2010 CX_{181}	Lauratoyama	February 14, 2010	Haleakala	Pan-STARRS 1	·	1.6 km	MPC · JPL
343414	2010 CH_{184}	—	February 15, 2010	Catalina	CSS	·	1.5 km	MPC · JPL
343415	2010 CL_{184}	—	September 11, 2007	Mount Lemmon	Mount Lemmon Survey	·	2.6 km	MPC · JPL
343416	2010 CR_{206}	—	February 4, 2010	WISE	WISE	EMA	4.4 km	MPC · JPL
343417	2010 CE_{248}	—	December 18, 2009	Mount Lemmon	Mount Lemmon Survey	·	2.1 km	MPC · JPL
343418	2010 DV_{1}	—	February 18, 2010	Catalina	CSS	BAR	1.9 km	MPC · JPL
343419	2010 DD_{4}	—	November 1, 2005	Kitt Peak	Spacewatch	NYS	1.1 km	MPC · JPL
343420	2010 DY_{6}	—	February 16, 2010	Kitt Peak	Spacewatch	·	2.1 km	MPC · JPL
343421	2010 DN_{8}	—	February 16, 2010	Kitt Peak	Spacewatch	MRX	1.2 km	MPC · JPL
343422	2010 DQ_{8}	—	February 16, 2010	Kitt Peak	Spacewatch	·	1.7 km	MPC · JPL
343423	2010 DF_{16}	—	February 19, 2010	Mount Lemmon	Mount Lemmon Survey	·	5.5 km	MPC · JPL
343424	2010 DV_{17}	—	March 27, 2007	Siding Spring	SSS	·	4.1 km	MPC · JPL
343425	2010 DL_{20}	—	February 19, 2010	Bisei SG Center	BATTeRS	·	2.6 km	MPC · JPL
343426	2010 DO_{22}	—	February 18, 2010	WISE	WISE	·	4.0 km	MPC · JPL
343427	2010 DD_{24}	—	May 12, 2004	Siding Spring	SSS	·	6.7 km	MPC · JPL
343428	2010 DY_{35}	—	September 11, 2007	Mount Lemmon	Mount Lemmon Survey	·	2.6 km	MPC · JPL
343429	2010 DW_{39}	—	February 16, 2010	Catalina	CSS	·	1.7 km	MPC · JPL
343430	2010 DV_{42}	—	February 17, 2010	Kitt Peak	Spacewatch	·	1.9 km	MPC · JPL
343431	2010 DM_{43}	—	December 14, 2004	Kitt Peak	Spacewatch	·	1.2 km	MPC · JPL
343432	2010 DD_{46}	—	February 17, 2010	Kitt Peak	Spacewatch	·	3.0 km	MPC · JPL
343433	2010 DT_{46}	—	February 17, 2010	Kitt Peak	Spacewatch	·	1.0 km	MPC · JPL
343434	2010 DU_{47}	—	February 17, 2010	Kitt Peak	Spacewatch	·	2.4 km	MPC · JPL
343435	2010 DC_{49}	—	February 18, 2010	Kitt Peak	Spacewatch	·	2.6 km	MPC · JPL
343436	2010 DJ_{49}	—	February 18, 2010	Catalina	CSS	·	4.4 km	MPC · JPL
343437	2010 DR_{75}	—	February 17, 2010	Kitt Peak	Spacewatch	·	3.0 km	MPC · JPL
343438 Gao	2010 DS_{77}	Gao	February 16, 2010	Haleakala	Pan-STARRS 1	·	2.5 km	MPC · JPL
343439 Kaukali	2010 DW_{77}	Kaukali	February 16, 2010	Haleakala	Pan-STARRS 1	EOS	2.4 km	MPC · JPL
343440 Magnier	2010 DY_{77}	Magnier	February 16, 2010	Haleakala	Pan-STARRS 1	·	1.6 km	MPC · JPL
343441 Chienchenglin	2010 DC_{78}	Chienchenglin	February 16, 2010	Haleakala	Pan-STARRS 1	·	1.7 km	MPC · JPL
343442	2010 DH_{79}	—	February 17, 2010	Socorro	LINEAR	PAD	3.2 km	MPC · JPL
343443	2010 DJ_{79}	—	February 19, 2010	Mount Lemmon	Mount Lemmon Survey	·	2.7 km	MPC · JPL
343444 Halluzinelle	2010 EW_{20}	Halluzinelle	March 7, 2010	Taunus	Karge, S., E. Schwab	·	1.8 km	MPC · JPL
343445	2010 EJ_{29}	—	March 5, 2010	Kitt Peak	Spacewatch	·	2.0 km	MPC · JPL
343446	2010 EC_{30}	—	March 5, 2010	Catalina	CSS	·	1.9 km	MPC · JPL
343447	2010 EZ_{31}	—	March 4, 2010	Kitt Peak	Spacewatch	PAD	1.6 km	MPC · JPL
343448	2010 EK_{32}	—	March 8, 2005	Mount Lemmon	Mount Lemmon Survey	KOR	1.8 km	MPC · JPL
343449	2010 ER_{33}	—	March 4, 2010	Kitt Peak	Spacewatch	·	1.6 km	MPC · JPL
343450	2010 EY_{33}	—	March 5, 2010	Kitt Peak	Spacewatch	·	1.7 km	MPC · JPL
343451	2010 EY_{34}	—	October 11, 2007	Mount Lemmon	Mount Lemmon Survey	·	3.1 km	MPC · JPL
343452	2010 EF_{35}	—	March 10, 2010	Purple Mountain	PMO NEO Survey Program	·	3.1 km	MPC · JPL
343453	2010 EH_{39}	—	March 10, 2010	Purple Mountain	PMO NEO Survey Program	·	2.6 km	MPC · JPL
343454	2010 EN_{39}	—	March 10, 2010	Purple Mountain	PMO NEO Survey Program	GEF	1.9 km	MPC · JPL
343455	2010 EO_{39}	—	March 10, 2010	Purple Mountain	PMO NEO Survey Program	·	4.0 km	MPC · JPL
343456	2010 EP_{39}	—	March 10, 2010	Purple Mountain	PMO NEO Survey Program	·	1.6 km	MPC · JPL
343457	2010 ET_{39}	—	March 10, 2010	La Sagra	OAM	EUN	1.7 km	MPC · JPL
343458	2010 EH_{41}	—	March 5, 2010	Kitt Peak	Spacewatch	·	2.7 km	MPC · JPL
343459	2010 EJ_{41}	—	March 5, 2010	Kitt Peak	Spacewatch	·	1.6 km	MPC · JPL
343460	2010 EB_{42}	—	March 12, 2010	Mount Lemmon	Mount Lemmon Survey	·	1.6 km	MPC · JPL
343461	2010 EG_{44}	—	March 13, 2010	Črni Vrh	Mikuž, B.	·	3.4 km	MPC · JPL
343462	2010 EB_{45}	—	March 13, 2010	Dauban	Kugel, F.	LEO	2.1 km	MPC · JPL
343463	2010 EH_{45}	—	March 14, 2010	Dauban	Kugel, F.	KOR	1.6 km	MPC · JPL
343464	2010 EN_{61}	—	March 14, 2010	WISE	WISE	EUP	4.8 km	MPC · JPL
343465	2010 EC_{67}	—	March 12, 2010	Catalina	CSS	·	2.3 km	MPC · JPL
343466	2010 EH_{67}	—	December 26, 2005	Kitt Peak	Spacewatch	·	1.2 km	MPC · JPL
343467	2010 EL_{67}	—	October 4, 2007	Catalina	CSS	·	2.5 km	MPC · JPL
343468	2010 EX_{68}	—	March 12, 2010	Catalina	CSS	(5)	1.9 km	MPC · JPL
343469	2010 EQ_{69}	—	March 13, 2010	Catalina	CSS	·	3.5 km	MPC · JPL
343470	2010 EW_{69}	—	March 13, 2010	Kitt Peak	Spacewatch	·	2.9 km	MPC · JPL
343471	2010 EO_{70}	—	March 12, 2010	Kitt Peak	Spacewatch	·	3.6 km	MPC · JPL
343472	2010 ER_{70}	—	March 10, 1999	Kitt Peak	Spacewatch	·	2.3 km	MPC · JPL
343473	2010 EF_{71}	—	March 12, 2010	Mount Lemmon	Mount Lemmon Survey	·	2.2 km	MPC · JPL
343474	2010 EN_{73}	—	March 2, 2005	Catalina	CSS	·	2.8 km	MPC · JPL
343475	2010 EQ_{74}	—	October 3, 2008	Mount Lemmon	Mount Lemmon Survey	·	2.2 km	MPC · JPL
343476	2010 EF_{77}	—	March 12, 2010	Kitt Peak	Spacewatch	·	3.3 km	MPC · JPL
343477	2010 EM_{79}	—	March 12, 2010	Mount Lemmon	Mount Lemmon Survey	KOR	1.5 km	MPC · JPL
343478	2010 ES_{80}	—	March 12, 2010	Mount Lemmon	Mount Lemmon Survey	AST	2.5 km	MPC · JPL
343479	2010 EQ_{83}	—	March 12, 2010	Kitt Peak	Spacewatch	·	3.1 km	MPC · JPL
343480	2010 ER_{83}	—	March 12, 2010	Mount Lemmon	Mount Lemmon Survey	·	2.9 km	MPC · JPL
343481	2010 EH_{84}	—	March 8, 2005	Mount Lemmon	Mount Lemmon Survey	AGN	1.5 km	MPC · JPL
343482	2010 EX_{84}	—	March 13, 2010	Kitt Peak	Spacewatch	·	1.9 km	MPC · JPL
343483	2010 EY_{84}	—	September 12, 2007	Mount Lemmon	Mount Lemmon Survey	·	2.3 km	MPC · JPL
343484	2010 EH_{85}	—	April 8, 2006	Kitt Peak	Spacewatch	·	2.1 km	MPC · JPL
343485	2010 EA_{86}	—	March 13, 2010	Kitt Peak	Spacewatch	·	3.8 km	MPC · JPL
343486	2010 EJ_{87}	—	March 13, 2010	Kitt Peak	Spacewatch	EOS	2.0 km	MPC · JPL
343487	2010 EY_{87}	—	March 14, 2010	La Sagra	OAM	·	2.7 km	MPC · JPL
343488	2010 ET_{89}	—	May 3, 2006	Kitt Peak	Spacewatch	·	1.9 km	MPC · JPL
343489	2010 EA_{90}	—	March 9, 2005	Mount Lemmon	Mount Lemmon Survey	·	2.0 km	MPC · JPL
343490	2010 ET_{94}	—	September 20, 2008	Kitt Peak	Spacewatch	·	1.1 km	MPC · JPL
343491	2010 EV_{96}	—	October 8, 1994	Kitt Peak	Spacewatch	·	870 m	MPC · JPL
343492	2010 EC_{100}	—	November 12, 2007	Mount Lemmon	Mount Lemmon Survey	·	3.7 km	MPC · JPL
343493	2010 EG_{100}	—	March 14, 2010	Kitt Peak	Spacewatch	·	3.9 km	MPC · JPL
343494	2010 EA_{102}	—	September 4, 2007	Mount Lemmon	Mount Lemmon Survey	PAD	3.2 km	MPC · JPL
343495	2010 EH_{102}	—	September 12, 1998	Kitt Peak	Spacewatch	·	2.2 km	MPC · JPL
343496	2010 EK_{102}	—	March 15, 2010	Kitt Peak	Spacewatch	·	2.5 km	MPC · JPL
343497	2010 EB_{104}	—	March 10, 2005	Mount Lemmon	Mount Lemmon Survey	·	2.2 km	MPC · JPL
343498	2010 EH_{105}	—	February 14, 2010	Kitt Peak	Spacewatch	EOS	2.5 km	MPC · JPL
343499	2010 EJ_{105}	—	March 12, 2010	Kitt Peak	Spacewatch	·	2.3 km	MPC · JPL
343500	2010 EO_{105}	—	March 12, 2010	Catalina	CSS	·	2.4 km	MPC · JPL

== 343501–343600 ==
back to top

Designation			Discovery			Properties		Ref
Permanent	Provisional	Named after	Date	Site	Discoverer(s)	Category	Diam.	Ref
343501	2010 EC_{106}	—	March 13, 2010	Catalina	CSS	·	2.9 km	MPC · JPL
343502	2010 ED_{106}	—	March 13, 2010	Catalina	CSS	·	2.3 km	MPC · JPL
343503	2010 EW_{107}	—	March 12, 2010	Kitt Peak	Spacewatch	·	2.8 km	MPC · JPL
343504	2010 EK_{108}	—	March 13, 2010	Kitt Peak	Spacewatch	·	2.4 km	MPC · JPL
343505	2010 EN_{108}	—	March 13, 2010	Kitt Peak	Spacewatch	·	4.6 km	MPC · JPL
343506	2010 EX_{109}	—	March 4, 2010	Kitt Peak	Spacewatch	PAD	2.0 km	MPC · JPL
343507	2010 EP_{110}	—	March 12, 2010	Kitt Peak	Spacewatch	EOS	2.5 km	MPC · JPL
343508	2010 EX_{110}	—	March 12, 2010	Kitt Peak	Spacewatch	EOS	2.3 km	MPC · JPL
343509	2010 EN_{111}	—	March 15, 2010	Kitt Peak	Spacewatch	VER	4.3 km	MPC · JPL
343510	2010 EH_{112}	—	March 12, 2010	Kitt Peak	Spacewatch	·	4.1 km	MPC · JPL
343511	2010 EV_{112}	—	March 13, 2010	Kitt Peak	Spacewatch	·	4.8 km	MPC · JPL
343512	2010 EC_{113}	—	August 16, 2006	Siding Spring	SSS	·	3.4 km	MPC · JPL
343513	2010 EF_{113}	—	March 14, 2010	Kitt Peak	Spacewatch	·	4.1 km	MPC · JPL
343514	2010 EH_{113}	—	March 14, 2010	Kitt Peak	Spacewatch	·	2.2 km	MPC · JPL
343515	2010 EC_{123}	—	March 15, 2010	Kitt Peak	Spacewatch	EOS	4.8 km	MPC · JPL
343516	2010 ED_{123}	—	March 15, 2010	Mount Lemmon	Mount Lemmon Survey	·	3.0 km	MPC · JPL
343517	2010 EF_{125}	—	March 12, 2010	Mount Lemmon	Mount Lemmon Survey	·	3.5 km	MPC · JPL
343518	2010 EY_{125}	—	February 1, 2001	Socorro	LINEAR	·	2.7 km	MPC · JPL
343519	2010 EE_{126}	—	March 13, 2010	Catalina	CSS	·	2.5 km	MPC · JPL
343520	2010 ER_{128}	—	September 11, 2007	Kitt Peak	Spacewatch	·	2.0 km	MPC · JPL
343521	2010 EG_{130}	—	March 13, 2010	Kitt Peak	Spacewatch	WIT	1.1 km	MPC · JPL
343522	2010 EP_{130}	—	March 13, 2010	Kitt Peak	Spacewatch	PAD	2.7 km	MPC · JPL
343523	2010 ET_{131}	—	March 15, 2010	Kitt Peak	Spacewatch	·	3.3 km	MPC · JPL
343524	2010 EQ_{132}	—	August 14, 2002	Kitt Peak	Spacewatch	KOR	1.6 km	MPC · JPL
343525	2010 EZ_{132}	—	March 13, 2010	Kitt Peak	Spacewatch	·	2.5 km	MPC · JPL
343526	2010 EF_{133}	—	March 13, 2010	Kitt Peak	Spacewatch	MIS	2.9 km	MPC · JPL
343527	2010 EX_{133}	—	March 4, 2010	Kitt Peak	Spacewatch	·	2.5 km	MPC · JPL
343528	2010 EH_{134}	—	March 12, 2010	Kitt Peak	Spacewatch	VER	4.2 km	MPC · JPL
343529	2010 EB_{136}	—	March 14, 2010	Kitt Peak	Spacewatch	·	1.1 km	MPC · JPL
343530	2010 EB_{137}	—	March 13, 2010	Mount Lemmon	Mount Lemmon Survey	·	3.9 km	MPC · JPL
343531	2010 EM_{138}	—	March 14, 2010	Kitt Peak	Spacewatch	·	2.5 km	MPC · JPL
343532	2010 EV_{138}	—	March 12, 2010	Catalina	CSS	·	4.8 km	MPC · JPL
343533	2010 EC_{139}	—	March 13, 2010	Kitt Peak	Spacewatch	·	4.0 km	MPC · JPL
343534	2010 EG_{139}	—	March 13, 2010	Mount Lemmon	Mount Lemmon Survey	HIL · 3:2	6.9 km	MPC · JPL
343535	2010 EZ_{139}	—	March 13, 2010	Kitt Peak	Spacewatch	EOS	2.0 km	MPC · JPL
343536	2010 ER_{140}	—	March 10, 2010	La Sagra	OAM	·	1.1 km	MPC · JPL
343537	2010 EP_{143}	—	March 14, 2010	Catalina	CSS	·	2.6 km	MPC · JPL
343538	2010 FG	—	March 16, 2010	Dauban	Kugel, F.	·	1.3 km	MPC · JPL
343539	2010 FW_{2}	—	May 20, 2006	Kitt Peak	Spacewatch	·	2.3 km	MPC · JPL
343540	2010 FZ_{3}	—	March 16, 2010	Mount Lemmon	Mount Lemmon Survey	HOF	4.1 km	MPC · JPL
343541	2010 FA_{7}	—	March 18, 2010	Mayhill	Lowe, A.	·	2.4 km	MPC · JPL
343542	2010 FV_{11}	—	March 16, 2010	Kitt Peak	Spacewatch	EUP	4.6 km	MPC · JPL
343543	2010 FR_{12}	—	March 16, 2010	Kitt Peak	Spacewatch	·	1.1 km	MPC · JPL
343544	2010 FZ_{12}	—	April 7, 1999	Kitt Peak	Spacewatch	·	2.8 km	MPC · JPL
343545	2010 FF_{14}	—	March 17, 2010	Kitt Peak	Spacewatch	EOS	2.2 km	MPC · JPL
343546	2010 FD_{16}	—	March 18, 2010	Kitt Peak	Spacewatch	·	3.4 km	MPC · JPL
343547	2010 FQ_{20}	—	March 26, 2006	Kitt Peak	Spacewatch	·	2.1 km	MPC · JPL
343548	2010 FM_{22}	—	November 26, 2003	Kitt Peak	Spacewatch	·	2.1 km	MPC · JPL
343549	2010 FG_{25}	—	March 19, 2010	Kitt Peak	Spacewatch	(5)	1.7 km	MPC · JPL
343550	2010 FR_{25}	—	March 19, 2010	Mount Lemmon	Mount Lemmon Survey	·	2.4 km	MPC · JPL
343551	2010 FU_{25}	—	April 7, 2006	Kitt Peak	Spacewatch	·	1.8 km	MPC · JPL
343552	2010 FC_{26}	—	February 29, 2004	Kitt Peak	Spacewatch	·	3.5 km	MPC · JPL
343553	2010 FW_{29}	—	March 17, 2010	Kitt Peak	Spacewatch	·	2.3 km	MPC · JPL
343554	2010 FD_{30}	—	March 17, 2010	Kitt Peak	Spacewatch	·	2.2 km	MPC · JPL
343555	2010 FM_{30}	—	March 18, 2010	Kitt Peak	Spacewatch	THM	2.6 km	MPC · JPL
343556	2010 FQ_{30}	—	March 20, 2010	Kitt Peak	Spacewatch	·	2.0 km	MPC · JPL
343557	2010 FX_{47}	—	March 22, 2010	ESA OGS	ESA OGS	·	2.7 km	MPC · JPL
343558	2010 FN_{53}	—	March 18, 2010	Kitt Peak	Spacewatch	·	2.8 km	MPC · JPL
343559	2010 FS_{53}	—	October 21, 2007	Mount Lemmon	Mount Lemmon Survey	·	2.2 km	MPC · JPL
343560	2010 FF_{54}	—	March 20, 2010	Kitt Peak	Spacewatch	(43176)	3.3 km	MPC · JPL
343561	2010 FG_{55}	—	March 21, 2010	Kitt Peak	Spacewatch	·	1.9 km	MPC · JPL
343562	2010 FW_{55}	—	March 16, 2010	Mount Lemmon	Mount Lemmon Survey	·	2.5 km	MPC · JPL
343563	2010 FL_{56}	—	March 21, 2010	Kitt Peak	Spacewatch	·	3.3 km	MPC · JPL
343564	2010 FO_{56}	—	March 16, 2010	Kitt Peak	Spacewatch	·	2.8 km	MPC · JPL
343565	2010 FE_{57}	—	March 16, 2010	Mount Lemmon	Mount Lemmon Survey	·	3.3 km	MPC · JPL
343566	2010 FK_{57}	—	November 4, 2004	Kitt Peak	Spacewatch	(5)	1.5 km	MPC · JPL
343567	2010 FB_{83}	—	March 24, 1995	Kitt Peak	Spacewatch	NAE	3.1 km	MPC · JPL
343568	2010 FD_{83}	—	March 23, 2006	Kitt Peak	Spacewatch	(5)	1.4 km	MPC · JPL
343569	2010 FU_{83}	—	January 17, 2004	Palomar	NEAT	·	2.3 km	MPC · JPL
343570	2010 FR_{84}	—	March 25, 2010	Mount Lemmon	Mount Lemmon Survey	·	2.8 km	MPC · JPL
343571	2010 FX_{84}	—	March 19, 2010	Mount Lemmon	Mount Lemmon Survey	HOF	3.3 km	MPC · JPL
343572	2010 FF_{85}	—	March 19, 2010	Mount Lemmon	Mount Lemmon Survey	EMA	5.4 km	MPC · JPL
343573	2010 FJ_{85}	—	December 20, 2009	Kitt Peak	Spacewatch	·	3.1 km	MPC · JPL
343574	2010 FC_{86}	—	March 26, 2010	Kitt Peak	Spacewatch	·	2.3 km	MPC · JPL
343575	2010 FW_{86}	—	March 20, 2010	Kitt Peak	Spacewatch	VER	4.0 km	MPC · JPL
343576	2010 FD_{87}	—	March 19, 2010	Catalina	CSS	PHO	1.7 km	MPC · JPL
343577	2010 FF_{88}	—	March 22, 2010	ESA OGS	ESA OGS	THM	2.4 km	MPC · JPL
343578	2010 FH_{88}	—	March 25, 2010	Kitt Peak	Spacewatch	·	4.7 km	MPC · JPL
343579	2010 FO_{88}	—	March 17, 2010	Kitt Peak	Spacewatch	·	1.8 km	MPC · JPL
343580	2010 FG_{89}	—	March 18, 2010	Mount Lemmon	Mount Lemmon Survey	HOF	2.7 km	MPC · JPL
343581	2010 FR_{90}	—	March 21, 2010	Mount Lemmon	Mount Lemmon Survey	AGN	1.2 km	MPC · JPL
343582	2010 FX_{94}	—	March 21, 2010	Kitt Peak	Spacewatch	NAE	3.2 km	MPC · JPL
343583	2010 FY_{94}	—	October 19, 2003	Kitt Peak	Spacewatch	·	1.6 km	MPC · JPL
343584	2010 FA_{95}	—	September 15, 2007	Kitt Peak	Spacewatch	KOR	1.6 km	MPC · JPL
343585	2010 FG_{101}	—	March 25, 2010	Kitt Peak	Spacewatch	·	2.9 km	MPC · JPL
343586	2010 GM_{9}	—	February 17, 2007	Kitt Peak	Spacewatch	L5	13 km	MPC · JPL
343587 Mamuna	2010 GQ_{23}	Mamuna	April 5, 2010	Zelenchukskaya Stn110133	T. V. Krjačko	·	3.7 km	MPC · JPL
343588	2010 GE_{27}	—	April 5, 2010	Kitt Peak	Spacewatch	EOS	2.5 km	MPC · JPL
343589	2010 GL_{28}	—	April 6, 2010	Catalina	CSS	·	2.4 km	MPC · JPL
343590	2010 GG_{33}	—	April 10, 2010	Catalina	CSS	·	2.3 km	MPC · JPL
343591	2010 GU_{62}	—	April 7, 2010	Socorro	LINEAR	·	3.0 km	MPC · JPL
343592	2010 GN_{66}	—	April 8, 2010	Kitt Peak	Spacewatch	EUN	1.9 km	MPC · JPL
343593	2010 GY_{95}	—	April 14, 2010	WISE	WISE	·	1.5 km	MPC · JPL
343594	2010 GJ_{97}	—	April 7, 2010	Kitt Peak	Spacewatch	·	3.1 km	MPC · JPL
343595	2010 GO_{98}	—	April 11, 2010	Kitt Peak	Spacewatch	·	3.8 km	MPC · JPL
343596	2010 GH_{101}	—	January 16, 2009	Kitt Peak	Spacewatch	·	3.2 km	MPC · JPL
343597	2010 GR_{101}	—	May 2, 2005	Kitt Peak	Spacewatch	·	2.3 km	MPC · JPL
343598	2010 GV_{103}	—	April 6, 2010	Kitt Peak	Spacewatch	·	3.8 km	MPC · JPL
343599	2010 GD_{105}	—	September 7, 1999	Socorro	LINEAR	·	3.8 km	MPC · JPL
343600	2010 GE_{109}	—	April 8, 2010	Mount Lemmon	Mount Lemmon Survey	·	1.5 km	MPC · JPL

== 343601–343700 ==
back to top

Designation			Discovery			Properties		Ref
Permanent	Provisional	Named after	Date	Site	Discoverer(s)	Category	Diam.	Ref
343601	2010 GN_{109}	—	April 9, 2010	Kitt Peak	Spacewatch	·	2.7 km	MPC · JPL
343602	2010 GU_{110}	—	April 9, 2010	Kitt Peak	Spacewatch	·	3.8 km	MPC · JPL
343603	2010 GW_{111}	—	April 9, 2010	Mount Lemmon	Mount Lemmon Survey	EOS	1.7 km	MPC · JPL
343604	2010 GY_{112}	—	December 19, 2003	Kitt Peak	Spacewatch	·	2.7 km	MPC · JPL
343605	2010 GE_{113}	—	September 14, 2006	Catalina	CSS	·	2.6 km	MPC · JPL
343606	2010 GF_{114}	—	April 10, 2010	Kitt Peak	Spacewatch	·	2.2 km	MPC · JPL
343607	2010 GQ_{114}	—	October 18, 2001	Kitt Peak	Spacewatch	·	3.5 km	MPC · JPL
343608	2010 GW_{114}	—	April 10, 2010	Kitt Peak	Spacewatch	·	2.0 km	MPC · JPL
343609	2010 GB_{115}	—	April 10, 2010	Kitt Peak	Spacewatch	·	1.8 km	MPC · JPL
343610	2010 GC_{116}	—	April 10, 2010	Kitt Peak	Spacewatch	·	3.1 km	MPC · JPL
343611	2010 GS_{121}	—	April 12, 2010	Mount Lemmon	Mount Lemmon Survey	·	3.0 km	MPC · JPL
343612	2010 GH_{122}	—	August 19, 2006	Kitt Peak	Spacewatch	EOS	2.2 km	MPC · JPL
343613	2010 GX_{122}	—	April 13, 2010	Vail-Jarnac	Jarnac	·	2.4 km	MPC · JPL
343614	2010 GD_{125}	—	April 8, 2010	Kitt Peak	Spacewatch	PAD	3.1 km	MPC · JPL
343615	2010 GE_{125}	—	April 8, 2010	Kitt Peak	Spacewatch	ARM	4.1 km	MPC · JPL
343616	2010 GC_{127}	—	April 10, 2010	Kitt Peak	Spacewatch	·	4.8 km	MPC · JPL
343617	2010 GT_{128}	—	April 4, 2010	Catalina	CSS	·	3.4 km	MPC · JPL
343618	2010 GD_{138}	—	December 9, 2004	Catalina	CSS	(5)	1.3 km	MPC · JPL
343619	2010 GM_{138}	—	April 6, 2010	Mount Lemmon	Mount Lemmon Survey	·	3.8 km	MPC · JPL
343620	2010 GY_{138}	—	April 6, 2010	Kitt Peak	Spacewatch	·	4.2 km	MPC · JPL
343621	2010 GV_{139}	—	April 7, 2010	Mount Lemmon	Mount Lemmon Survey	·	2.3 km	MPC · JPL
343622	2010 GF_{140}	—	April 7, 2010	Mount Lemmon	Mount Lemmon Survey	·	3.8 km	MPC · JPL
343623	2010 GL_{156}	—	September 10, 2007	Kitt Peak	Spacewatch	·	2.6 km	MPC · JPL
343624	2010 GN_{156}	—	April 7, 2010	Mount Lemmon	Mount Lemmon Survey	·	1.7 km	MPC · JPL
343625	2010 GA_{157}	—	April 9, 2010	Catalina	CSS	·	4.2 km	MPC · JPL
343626	2010 GP_{158}	—	April 14, 2010	Mount Lemmon	Mount Lemmon Survey	·	4.7 km	MPC · JPL
343627	2010 HY_{31}	—	April 19, 2010	WISE	WISE	L5	14 km	MPC · JPL
343628	2010 HC_{41}	—	April 22, 2010	WISE	WISE	L5	11 km	MPC · JPL
343629	2010 HA_{78}	—	April 20, 2010	Kitt Peak	Spacewatch	·	2.6 km	MPC · JPL
343630	2010 HP_{99}	—	April 30, 2010	WISE	WISE	·	2.8 km	MPC · JPL
343631	2010 HB_{105}	—	October 18, 2003	Kitt Peak	Spacewatch	·	2.6 km	MPC · JPL
343632	2010 HR_{107}	—	April 25, 2010	Mount Lemmon	Mount Lemmon Survey	·	2.4 km	MPC · JPL
343633	2010 HW_{107}	—	April 26, 2010	Mount Lemmon	Mount Lemmon Survey	·	4.2 km	MPC · JPL
343634	2010 HV_{110}	—	April 29, 2008	Mount Lemmon	Mount Lemmon Survey	L5	16 km	MPC · JPL
343635	2010 JC_{4}	—	May 1, 2010	WISE	WISE	PHO	1.9 km	MPC · JPL
343636	2010 JA_{29}	—	May 2, 2010	Kitt Peak	Spacewatch	·	2.3 km	MPC · JPL
343637	2010 JE_{29}	—	May 2, 2010	Kitt Peak	Spacewatch	·	4.2 km	MPC · JPL
343638	2010 JB_{31}	—	May 5, 2010	Nogales	Tenagra II	·	2.2 km	MPC · JPL
343639	2010 JM_{36}	—	January 20, 2009	Mount Lemmon	Mount Lemmon Survey	·	2.0 km	MPC · JPL
343640	2010 JM_{38}	—	May 4, 2010	Siding Spring	SSS	·	1.6 km	MPC · JPL
343641	2010 JV_{38}	—	October 21, 2007	Mount Lemmon	Mount Lemmon Survey	·	2.4 km	MPC · JPL
343642	2010 JC_{42}	—	May 7, 2010	WISE	WISE	L5	14 km	MPC · JPL
343643	2010 JF_{49}	—	May 9, 2010	Mount Lemmon	Mount Lemmon Survey	·	4.1 km	MPC · JPL
343644	2010 JX_{69}	—	December 19, 2004	Mount Lemmon	Mount Lemmon Survey	L5	13 km	MPC · JPL
343645	2010 JL_{72}	—	May 5, 2010	Mount Lemmon	Mount Lemmon Survey	·	3.4 km	MPC · JPL
343646	2010 JN_{72}	—	May 4, 2005	Kitt Peak	Spacewatch	·	2.7 km	MPC · JPL
343647	2010 JP_{74}	—	May 11, 2010	Mount Lemmon	Mount Lemmon Survey	·	4.1 km	MPC · JPL
343648	2010 JE_{80}	—	September 20, 2006	Catalina	CSS	·	4.7 km	MPC · JPL
343649	2010 JD_{84}	—	November 20, 2001	Socorro	LINEAR	EOS	2.5 km	MPC · JPL
343650	2010 JY_{85}	—	May 10, 2010	WISE	WISE	SUL	2.2 km	MPC · JPL
343651	2010 JH_{115}	—	May 8, 2010	Siding Spring	SSS	·	3.4 km	MPC · JPL
343652	2010 JG_{122}	—	September 5, 2000	Kitt Peak	Spacewatch	·	4.7 km	MPC · JPL
343653	2010 JB_{123}	—	May 12, 2010	Mount Lemmon	Mount Lemmon Survey	·	4.0 km	MPC · JPL
343654	2010 KA	—	May 16, 2010	Kitt Peak	Spacewatch	·	2.8 km	MPC · JPL
343655	2010 KN_{36}	—	May 19, 2010	Mount Lemmon	Mount Lemmon Survey	·	2.9 km	MPC · JPL
343656	2010 LR_{46}	—	June 8, 2010	WISE	WISE	·	3.2 km	MPC · JPL
343657	2010 LU_{60}	—	June 5, 2010	Kitt Peak	Spacewatch	·	3.3 km	MPC · JPL
343658	2010 LA_{61}	—	June 11, 2010	Mount Lemmon	Mount Lemmon Survey	·	4.6 km	MPC · JPL
343659	2010 LO_{65}	—	January 4, 2003	Kitt Peak	Spacewatch	·	3.5 km	MPC · JPL
343660	2010 LW_{113}	—	January 27, 1993	Caussols	E. W. Elst	·	2.1 km	MPC · JPL
343661	2010 MU_{16}	—	March 15, 2004	Kitt Peak	Spacewatch	·	4.6 km	MPC · JPL
343662 Robmorgan	2010 MO_{56}	Robmorgan	June 23, 2010	WISE	WISE	GEF ·	3.8 km	MPC · JPL
343663	2010 NL_{5}	—	October 21, 2001	Kitt Peak	Spacewatch	L5	10 km	MPC · JPL
343664 Nataliemainzer	2010 NM_{16}	Nataliemainzer	July 6, 2010	WISE	WISE	·	4.4 km	MPC · JPL
343665	2010 NM_{74}	—	July 15, 2010	WISE	WISE	EUP	4.3 km	MPC · JPL
343666	2010 OD_{37}	—	July 21, 2010	WISE	WISE	·	5.3 km	MPC · JPL
343667	2010 OY_{49}	—	July 22, 2010	WISE	WISE	·	4.4 km	MPC · JPL
343668	2010 OY_{52}	—	July 22, 2010	WISE	WISE	EMA	4.9 km	MPC · JPL
343669	2010 OP_{53}	—	July 23, 2010	WISE	WISE	·	3.9 km	MPC · JPL
343670	2010 OU_{57}	—	July 23, 2010	WISE	WISE	·	4.4 km	MPC · JPL
343671	2010 OV_{60}	—	July 23, 2010	WISE	WISE	·	4.5 km	MPC · JPL
343672	2010 OP_{69}	—	July 25, 2010	WISE	WISE	EOS	4.3 km	MPC · JPL
343673	2010 OD_{74}	—	July 25, 2010	WISE	WISE	·	4.4 km	MPC · JPL
343674	2010 OM_{78}	—	July 25, 2010	WISE	WISE	(260) · CYB	4.9 km	MPC · JPL
343675	2010 OU_{80}	—	July 26, 2010	WISE	WISE	·	3.1 km	MPC · JPL
343676	2010 OJ_{92}	—	January 1, 2009	Mount Lemmon	Mount Lemmon Survey	HYG	3.0 km	MPC · JPL
343677	2010 RT_{152}	—	December 29, 2008	Mount Lemmon	Mount Lemmon Survey	·	1.6 km	MPC · JPL
343678	2010 TC_{126}	—	July 12, 2005	Mount Lemmon	Mount Lemmon Survey	·	2.8 km	MPC · JPL
343679	2010 TV_{144}	—	August 22, 2004	Kitt Peak	Spacewatch	·	3.1 km	MPC · JPL
343680	2010 UD_{2}	—	October 17, 2010	Mount Lemmon	Mount Lemmon Survey	L4	10 km	MPC · JPL
343681	2010 VN_{199}	—	June 23, 2007	Kitt Peak	Spacewatch	L4	10 km	MPC · JPL
343682	2010 XW_{67}	—	January 6, 2002	Kitt Peak	Spacewatch	·	2.1 km	MPC · JPL
343683	2011 AW_{19}	—	October 17, 2001	Palomar	NEAT	·	1.7 km	MPC · JPL
343684	2011 BM_{35}	—	August 28, 2005	Kitt Peak	Spacewatch	NYS	1.1 km	MPC · JPL
343685	2011 BA_{47}	—	March 29, 1998	Socorro	LINEAR	H	640 m	MPC · JPL
343686	2011 BP_{88}	—	July 5, 2003	Kitt Peak	Spacewatch	·	1.7 km	MPC · JPL
343687	2011 BY_{143}	—	August 6, 2005	Palomar	NEAT	·	800 m	MPC · JPL
343688	2011 CX_{18}	—	March 2, 2007	Palomar	NEAT	·	2.1 km	MPC · JPL
343689	2011 CT_{22}	—	September 19, 1998	Apache Point	SDSS	L4	10 km	MPC · JPL
343690	2011 CQ_{26}	—	September 27, 2009	Mount Lemmon	Mount Lemmon Survey	·	2.7 km	MPC · JPL
343691	2011 CU_{43}	—	September 30, 2005	Mount Lemmon	Mount Lemmon Survey	·	1.3 km	MPC · JPL
343692	2011 CJ_{109}	—	April 28, 2008	Kitt Peak	Spacewatch	·	650 m	MPC · JPL
343693	2011 CF_{115}	—	September 3, 2008	Kitt Peak	Spacewatch	·	1.2 km	MPC · JPL
343694	2011 DH_{1}	—	February 21, 2007	Mount Lemmon	Mount Lemmon Survey	·	1.6 km	MPC · JPL
343695	2011 DB_{8}	—	April 16, 2004	Kitt Peak	Spacewatch	·	1.2 km	MPC · JPL
343696	2011 DG_{20}	—	February 22, 2004	Kitt Peak	Spacewatch	·	780 m	MPC · JPL
343697	2011 DO_{21}	—	March 16, 2004	Palomar	NEAT	·	1.7 km	MPC · JPL
343698	2011 DP_{23}	—	February 23, 2007	Mount Lemmon	Mount Lemmon Survey	MAS	810 m	MPC · JPL
343699	2011 DT_{24}	—	March 19, 2004	Palomar	NEAT	·	1.1 km	MPC · JPL
343700	2011 DB_{30}	—	February 16, 2004	Kitt Peak	Spacewatch	·	920 m	MPC · JPL

== 343701–343800 ==
back to top

Designation			Discovery			Properties		Ref
Permanent	Provisional	Named after	Date	Site	Discoverer(s)	Category	Diam.	Ref
343701	2011 DB_{42}	—	November 4, 2005	Mount Lemmon	Mount Lemmon Survey	NYS	1.3 km	MPC · JPL
343702	2011 DN_{50}	—	March 13, 2004	Palomar	NEAT	·	1.2 km	MPC · JPL
343703	2011 EY_{3}	—	September 6, 2008	Mount Lemmon	Mount Lemmon Survey	·	1.2 km	MPC · JPL
343704	2011 ES_{12}	—	December 13, 2010	Mount Lemmon	Mount Lemmon Survey	·	2.5 km	MPC · JPL
343705	2011 EZ_{16}	—	January 13, 2008	Catalina	CSS	H	630 m	MPC · JPL
343706	2011 EN_{17}	—	April 27, 2000	Anderson Mesa	LONEOS	T_{j} (2.98)	4.0 km	MPC · JPL
343707	2011 ET_{17}	—	September 13, 1980	Palomar	E. M. Shoemaker, C. S. Shoemaker	·	2.6 km	MPC · JPL
343708	2011 EV_{20}	—	September 14, 2002	Palomar	NEAT	·	990 m	MPC · JPL
343709	2011 EG_{25}	—	March 17, 2004	Kitt Peak	Spacewatch	·	910 m	MPC · JPL
343710	2011 EM_{25}	—	November 4, 2005	Mount Lemmon	Mount Lemmon Survey	·	1.7 km	MPC · JPL
343711	2011 EN_{25}	—	August 8, 2004	Palomar	NEAT	·	2.1 km	MPC · JPL
343712	2011 ES_{26}	—	October 5, 2002	Apache Point	SDSS	·	700 m	MPC · JPL
343713	2011 ED_{36}	—	June 14, 2008	Siding Spring	SSS	PHO	1.6 km	MPC · JPL
343714	2011 EL_{37}	—	October 5, 2005	Catalina	CSS	·	1.2 km	MPC · JPL
343715	2011 ER_{39}	—	April 11, 2007	Kitt Peak	Spacewatch	·	1.6 km	MPC · JPL
343716	2011 EW_{54}	—	April 19, 2007	Mount Lemmon	Mount Lemmon Survey	·	2.4 km	MPC · JPL
343717	2011 EZ_{64}	—	August 31, 2005	Palomar	NEAT	·	670 m	MPC · JPL
343718	2011 EP_{66}	—	January 27, 2007	Mount Lemmon	Mount Lemmon Survey	NYS	1.2 km	MPC · JPL
343719	2011 ES_{67}	—	February 9, 2007	Kitt Peak	Spacewatch	·	1.6 km	MPC · JPL
343720	2011 EM_{68}	—	April 11, 1996	Kitt Peak	Spacewatch	·	1.5 km	MPC · JPL
343721	2011 EW_{68}	—	June 30, 2008	Kitt Peak	Spacewatch	·	900 m	MPC · JPL
343722	2011 ED_{69}	—	May 28, 2000	Socorro	LINEAR	·	1.4 km	MPC · JPL
343723	2011 EY_{70}	—	March 15, 2004	Socorro	LINEAR	·	830 m	MPC · JPL
343724	2011 EK_{71}	—	April 14, 2004	Kitt Peak	Spacewatch	NYS	900 m	MPC · JPL
343725	2011 EN_{72}	—	February 21, 2007	Kitt Peak	Spacewatch	V	950 m	MPC · JPL
343726	2011 EL_{74}	—	November 24, 2009	Kitt Peak	Spacewatch	·	750 m	MPC · JPL
343727	2011 EY_{77}	—	November 2, 1999	Kitt Peak	Spacewatch	H	660 m	MPC · JPL
343728	2011 EK_{78}	—	September 21, 2001	Kitt Peak	Spacewatch	H	450 m	MPC · JPL
343729	2011 EY_{81}	—	September 8, 2004	Palomar	NEAT	H	670 m	MPC · JPL
343730	2011 FY	—	April 12, 2004	Kitt Peak	Spacewatch	V	680 m	MPC · JPL
343731	2011 FR_{1}	—	February 16, 2004	Kitt Peak	Spacewatch	·	850 m	MPC · JPL
343732	2011 FL_{2}	—	August 29, 2005	Kitt Peak	Spacewatch	·	1.1 km	MPC · JPL
343733	2011 FV_{5}	—	February 16, 2007	Catalina	CSS	·	1.8 km	MPC · JPL
343734	2011 FV_{7}	—	May 15, 2001	Haleakala	NEAT	·	940 m	MPC · JPL
343735	2011 FS_{8}	—	March 10, 2007	Kitt Peak	Spacewatch	·	1.5 km	MPC · JPL
343736	2011 FZ_{8}	—	March 14, 2007	Mount Lemmon	Mount Lemmon Survey	·	1.2 km	MPC · JPL
343737	2011 FO_{9}	—	October 5, 2002	Apache Point	SDSS	·	730 m	MPC · JPL
343738	2011 FD_{12}	—	March 2, 2010	WISE	WISE	·	3.2 km	MPC · JPL
343739	2011 FW_{12}	—	April 30, 2003	Kitt Peak	Spacewatch	·	1.3 km	MPC · JPL
343740	2011 FE_{13}	—	June 16, 1996	Kitt Peak	Spacewatch	V	810 m	MPC · JPL
343741	2011 FW_{14}	—	March 31, 2008	Mount Lemmon	Mount Lemmon Survey	·	720 m	MPC · JPL
343742	2011 FC_{15}	—	March 27, 2010	WISE	WISE	PHO	3.3 km	MPC · JPL
343743 Kjurkchieva	2011 FY_{16}	Kjurkchieva	September 5, 2008	Kitt Peak	Spacewatch	·	2.1 km	MPC · JPL
343744	2011 FL_{21}	—	October 20, 2001	Socorro	LINEAR	MAS	830 m	MPC · JPL
343745	2011 FB_{30}	—	October 7, 2008	Kitt Peak	Spacewatch	·	2.0 km	MPC · JPL
343746	2011 FK_{31}	—	March 11, 2007	Kitt Peak	Spacewatch	V	800 m	MPC · JPL
343747	2011 FX_{34}	—	February 26, 2007	Mount Lemmon	Mount Lemmon Survey	·	1.1 km	MPC · JPL
343748	2011 FM_{36}	—	April 7, 2003	Kitt Peak	Spacewatch	·	1.4 km	MPC · JPL
343749	2011 FY_{47}	—	April 29, 2000	Socorro	LINEAR	·	2.9 km	MPC · JPL
343750	2011 FA_{48}	—	April 9, 2002	Kitt Peak	Spacewatch	·	2.3 km	MPC · JPL
343751	2011 FN_{48}	—	November 9, 1996	Kitt Peak	Spacewatch	·	820 m	MPC · JPL
343752	2011 FQ_{48}	—	March 8, 2000	Kitt Peak	Spacewatch	·	2.2 km	MPC · JPL
343753	2011 FT_{51}	—	May 6, 2008	Mount Lemmon	Mount Lemmon Survey	·	930 m	MPC · JPL
343754	2011 FG_{56}	—	October 12, 2009	Mount Lemmon	Mount Lemmon Survey	·	880 m	MPC · JPL
343755	2011 FJ_{56}	—	April 4, 2002	Palomar	NEAT	·	1.9 km	MPC · JPL
343756	2011 FF_{60}	—	May 22, 2007	Tiki	S. F. Hönig, Teamo, N.	MIS	2.4 km	MPC · JPL
343757	2011 FM_{63}	—	October 25, 2005	Mount Lemmon	Mount Lemmon Survey	MAS	790 m	MPC · JPL
343758	2011 FY_{82}	—	October 12, 2005	Kitt Peak	Spacewatch	·	690 m	MPC · JPL
343759	2011 FE_{83}	—	February 23, 2007	Kitt Peak	Spacewatch	·	1.6 km	MPC · JPL
343760	2011 FS_{83}	—	March 15, 2001	Kitt Peak	Spacewatch	·	750 m	MPC · JPL
343761	2011 FT_{88}	—	September 14, 1999	Kitt Peak	Spacewatch	ADE	2.4 km	MPC · JPL
343762	2011 FC_{103}	—	July 11, 2004	Socorro	LINEAR	·	1.5 km	MPC · JPL
343763	2011 FQ_{120}	—	March 10, 2007	Mount Lemmon	Mount Lemmon Survey	·	960 m	MPC · JPL
343764	2011 FO_{126}	—	November 13, 2006	Kitt Peak	Spacewatch	·	810 m	MPC · JPL
343765	2011 FN_{130}	—	November 19, 2009	Mount Lemmon	Mount Lemmon Survey	V	760 m	MPC · JPL
343766	2011 FZ_{140}	—	August 31, 2005	Kitt Peak	Spacewatch	·	850 m	MPC · JPL
343767	2011 FK_{141}	—	February 11, 2004	Palomar	NEAT	·	820 m	MPC · JPL
343768	2011 FD_{142}	—	May 13, 2007	XuYi	PMO NEO Survey Program	·	1.9 km	MPC · JPL
343769	2011 FM_{145}	—	July 28, 2008	Mount Lemmon	Mount Lemmon Survey	·	1.5 km	MPC · JPL
343770	2011 FJ_{148}	—	August 31, 2005	Palomar	NEAT	·	1.1 km	MPC · JPL
343771	2011 FY_{148}	—	October 5, 2005	Mount Lemmon	Mount Lemmon Survey	·	900 m	MPC · JPL
343772	2011 FV_{149}	—	March 13, 2004	Palomar	NEAT	·	1.0 km	MPC · JPL
343773	2011 FC_{150}	—	September 16, 2009	Kitt Peak	Spacewatch	·	1.1 km	MPC · JPL
343774 Samuelhale	2011 FN_{150}	Samuelhale	October 20, 2006	Kitt Peak	Deep Ecliptic Survey	NYS	1.6 km	MPC · JPL
343775	2011 FA_{151}	—	January 9, 2006	Mount Lemmon	Mount Lemmon Survey	·	2.4 km	MPC · JPL
343776	2011 FV_{154}	—	August 23, 2001	Palomar	NEAT	H	770 m	MPC · JPL
343777	2011 GL	—	March 12, 2007	Mount Lemmon	Mount Lemmon Survey	NYS	1.8 km	MPC · JPL
343778	2011 GK_{1}	—	August 30, 2005	Socorro	LINEAR	·	1.1 km	MPC · JPL
343779	2011 GF_{2}	—	May 8, 2007	Catalina	CSS	·	1.8 km	MPC · JPL
343780	2011 GQ_{3}	—	December 21, 2006	Mount Lemmon	Mount Lemmon Survey	·	770 m	MPC · JPL
343781	2011 GJ_{13}	—	March 18, 2004	Socorro	LINEAR	·	870 m	MPC · JPL
343782	2011 GN_{28}	—	January 28, 2007	Kitt Peak	Spacewatch	·	970 m	MPC · JPL
343783	2011 GP_{30}	—	November 18, 2006	Mount Lemmon	Mount Lemmon Survey	·	930 m	MPC · JPL
343784	2011 GZ_{31}	—	May 8, 1997	Kitt Peak	Spacewatch	·	910 m	MPC · JPL
343785	2011 GB_{36}	—	October 26, 2009	Kitt Peak	Spacewatch	·	1.0 km	MPC · JPL
343786	2011 GL_{37}	—	July 28, 2008	Siding Spring	SSS	·	1.7 km	MPC · JPL
343787	2011 GU_{41}	—	August 1, 2001	Palomar	NEAT	H	840 m	MPC · JPL
343788	2011 GT_{48}	—	March 13, 2007	Mount Lemmon	Mount Lemmon Survey	EUN	1.1 km	MPC · JPL
343789	2011 GU_{49}	—	October 6, 2008	Mount Lemmon	Mount Lemmon Survey	·	1.5 km	MPC · JPL
343790	2011 GH_{53}	—	January 31, 2006	Kitt Peak	Spacewatch	LEO	1.8 km	MPC · JPL
343791	2011 GR_{56}	—	October 20, 2008	Kitt Peak	Spacewatch	·	1.7 km	MPC · JPL
343792	2011 GH_{57}	—	May 26, 2007	Mount Lemmon	Mount Lemmon Survey	·	1.8 km	MPC · JPL
343793	2011 GR_{58}	—	January 22, 2006	Mount Lemmon	Mount Lemmon Survey	·	1.7 km	MPC · JPL
343794	2011 GO_{61}	—	December 15, 1998	Caussols	ODAS	L4	10 km	MPC · JPL
343795	2011 GO_{63}	—	March 14, 2004	Kitt Peak	Spacewatch	·	1.1 km	MPC · JPL
343796	2011 GA_{64}	—	September 23, 1995	Kitt Peak	Spacewatch	·	760 m	MPC · JPL
343797	2011 GA_{65}	—	June 15, 2001	Haleakala	NEAT	·	850 m	MPC · JPL
343798	2011 GB_{65}	—	August 10, 2004	Socorro	LINEAR	·	1.7 km	MPC · JPL
343799	2011 GE_{65}	—	February 26, 2007	Mount Lemmon	Mount Lemmon Survey	·	1.6 km	MPC · JPL
343800	2011 GD_{66}	—	May 22, 2001	Cerro Tololo	Deep Ecliptic Survey	·	4.0 km	MPC · JPL

== 343801–343900 ==
back to top

Designation			Discovery			Properties		Ref
Permanent	Provisional	Named after	Date	Site	Discoverer(s)	Category	Diam.	Ref
343801	2011 GO_{66}	—	March 1, 2011	Mount Lemmon	Mount Lemmon Survey	·	890 m	MPC · JPL
343802	2011 GT_{70}	—	June 28, 2001	Palomar	NEAT	PHO	990 m	MPC · JPL
343803	2011 GP_{71}	—	October 21, 2001	Socorro	LINEAR	NYS	1.3 km	MPC · JPL
343804	2011 GA_{78}	—	January 23, 2006	Catalina	CSS	ADE	2.4 km	MPC · JPL
343805	2011 GR_{80}	—	March 29, 2000	Kitt Peak	Spacewatch	MAS	810 m	MPC · JPL
343806	2011 GQ_{82}	—	September 21, 1995	Haleakala	AMOS	·	980 m	MPC · JPL
343807	2011 GE_{83}	—	November 17, 1995	Kitt Peak	Spacewatch	·	2.3 km	MPC · JPL
343808	2011 GJ_{85}	—	March 12, 2004	Palomar	NEAT	·	900 m	MPC · JPL
343809	2011 HP_{1}	—	March 31, 2003	Anderson Mesa	LONEOS	·	4.0 km	MPC · JPL
343810	2011 HA_{3}	—	November 5, 2004	Anderson Mesa	LONEOS	·	2.5 km	MPC · JPL
343811	2011 HC_{6}	—	April 5, 2000	Anderson Mesa	LONEOS	NYS	1.2 km	MPC · JPL
343812	2011 HU_{6}	—	February 10, 2007	Mount Lemmon	Mount Lemmon Survey	·	940 m	MPC · JPL
343813	2011 HM_{7}	—	April 6, 2010	WISE	WISE	·	2.7 km	MPC · JPL
343814	2011 HK_{9}	—	September 4, 1999	Kitt Peak	Spacewatch	·	1.8 km	MPC · JPL
343815	2011 HT_{10}	—	September 29, 2005	Kitt Peak	Spacewatch	·	1.1 km	MPC · JPL
343816	2011 HO_{11}	—	August 15, 2001	Haleakala	NEAT	·	2.4 km	MPC · JPL
343817	2011 HT_{11}	—	March 16, 2007	Kitt Peak	Spacewatch	·	1.1 km	MPC · JPL
343818	2011 HZ_{11}	—	April 17, 1998	Kitt Peak	Spacewatch	EUN	1.3 km	MPC · JPL
343819	2011 HU_{12}	—	December 17, 2009	Mount Lemmon	Mount Lemmon Survey	·	1.7 km	MPC · JPL
343820	2011 HV_{17}	—	October 1, 2002	Socorro	LINEAR	·	1.0 km	MPC · JPL
343821	2011 HF_{18}	—	March 12, 2007	Mount Lemmon	Mount Lemmon Survey	V	960 m	MPC · JPL
343822	2011 HJ_{19}	—	November 4, 2004	Kitt Peak	Spacewatch	MRX	1.1 km	MPC · JPL
343823	2011 HE_{20}	—	January 6, 2010	Kitt Peak	Spacewatch	MAR	1.2 km	MPC · JPL
343824	2011 HQ_{20}	—	September 13, 2005	Kitt Peak	Spacewatch	·	810 m	MPC · JPL
343825	2011 HS_{22}	—	November 18, 2003	Kitt Peak	Spacewatch	·	2.8 km	MPC · JPL
343826	2011 HX_{23}	—	October 19, 2003	Kitt Peak	Spacewatch	·	1.9 km	MPC · JPL
343827	2011 HA_{24}	—	February 25, 2006	Mount Lemmon	Mount Lemmon Survey	·	1.7 km	MPC · JPL
343828	2011 HC_{26}	—	November 1, 2008	Mount Lemmon	Mount Lemmon Survey	MIS	2.7 km	MPC · JPL
343829	2011 HE_{26}	—	March 17, 2004	Kitt Peak	Spacewatch	·	860 m	MPC · JPL
343830	2011 HC_{27}	—	February 15, 2010	Mount Lemmon	Mount Lemmon Survey	·	3.8 km	MPC · JPL
343831	2011 HD_{27}	—	February 13, 2004	Kitt Peak	Spacewatch	·	990 m	MPC · JPL
343832	2011 HN_{27}	—	August 12, 2006	Palomar	NEAT	·	4.1 km	MPC · JPL
343833	2011 HR_{27}	—	May 11, 1996	Kitt Peak	Spacewatch	NYS	1.4 km	MPC · JPL
343834	2011 HT_{27}	—	September 14, 2007	Catalina	CSS	EOS	2.7 km	MPC · JPL
343835	2011 HD_{28}	—	August 7, 2008	Kitt Peak	Spacewatch	·	1.7 km	MPC · JPL
343836	2011 HQ_{29}	—	July 30, 2008	Siding Spring	SSS	·	1.0 km	MPC · JPL
343837	2011 HB_{30}	—	March 29, 2000	Kitt Peak	Spacewatch	·	1.0 km	MPC · JPL
343838	2011 HY_{30}	—	April 1, 2005	Kitt Peak	Spacewatch	·	3.3 km	MPC · JPL
343839	2011 HM_{31}	—	November 7, 2008	Mount Lemmon	Mount Lemmon Survey	·	1.9 km	MPC · JPL
343840	2011 HY_{31}	—	December 15, 2004	Kitt Peak	Spacewatch	EUN	1.6 km	MPC · JPL
343841	2011 HW_{32}	—	February 25, 2006	Mount Lemmon	Mount Lemmon Survey	·	1.4 km	MPC · JPL
343842	2011 HV_{33}	—	August 31, 1995	La Silla	C.-I. Lagerkvist	·	2.0 km	MPC · JPL
343843	2011 HR_{34}	—	September 24, 2008	Mount Lemmon	Mount Lemmon Survey	·	1.1 km	MPC · JPL
343844	2011 HA_{38}	—	July 10, 2007	Siding Spring	SSS	·	2.5 km	MPC · JPL
343845	2011 HN_{38}	—	February 21, 2007	Kitt Peak	Spacewatch	·	970 m	MPC · JPL
343846	2011 HO_{38}	—	March 7, 2003	Kitt Peak	Spacewatch	PHO	1.2 km	MPC · JPL
343847	2011 HF_{39}	—	December 25, 2005	Mount Lemmon	Mount Lemmon Survey	·	1.6 km	MPC · JPL
343848	2011 HT_{39}	—	December 14, 2004	Socorro	LINEAR	·	2.7 km	MPC · JPL
343849	2011 HQ_{41}	—	April 9, 2006	Kitt Peak	Spacewatch	GAL	1.9 km	MPC · JPL
343850	2011 HP_{43}	—	July 18, 2006	Siding Spring	SSS	·	4.1 km	MPC · JPL
343851	2011 HA_{44}	—	February 26, 2007	Mount Lemmon	Mount Lemmon Survey	·	1.2 km	MPC · JPL
343852	2011 HY_{44}	—	April 25, 2007	Kitt Peak	Spacewatch	·	1.1 km	MPC · JPL
343853	2011 HP_{45}	—	April 9, 2003	Kitt Peak	Spacewatch	EUN	1.2 km	MPC · JPL
343854	2011 HF_{46}	—	November 6, 2005	Mount Lemmon	Mount Lemmon Survey	V	730 m	MPC · JPL
343855	2011 HZ_{46}	—	July 4, 2003	Kitt Peak	Spacewatch	EUN	1.2 km	MPC · JPL
343856	2011 HH_{49}	—	April 20, 2004	Kitt Peak	Spacewatch	·	1.1 km	MPC · JPL
343857	2011 HA_{50}	—	March 20, 2002	Kitt Peak	Spacewatch	EUN	1.6 km	MPC · JPL
343858	2011 HP_{52}	—	October 27, 2008	Mount Lemmon	Mount Lemmon Survey	·	2.6 km	MPC · JPL
343859	2011 HU_{52}	—	October 8, 2001	Palomar	NEAT	·	4.4 km	MPC · JPL
343860	2011 HP_{55}	—	February 23, 2007	Kitt Peak	Spacewatch	·	1.5 km	MPC · JPL
343861	2011 HU_{55}	—	August 24, 2008	Kitt Peak	Spacewatch	MAR	1.2 km	MPC · JPL
343862	2011 HC_{60}	—	October 7, 2005	Catalina	CSS	(2076)	1.1 km	MPC · JPL
343863	2011 HT_{60}	—	June 11, 2004	Kitt Peak	Spacewatch	·	1.2 km	MPC · JPL
343864	2011 HU_{60}	—	January 27, 2007	Mount Lemmon	Mount Lemmon Survey	MAS	880 m	MPC · JPL
343865	2011 HO_{62}	—	September 14, 2007	Catalina	CSS	·	4.9 km	MPC · JPL
343866	2011 HN_{64}	—	April 24, 2003	Kitt Peak	Spacewatch	·	1.1 km	MPC · JPL
343867	2011 HH_{65}	—	February 25, 2006	Kitt Peak	Spacewatch	·	1.7 km	MPC · JPL
343868	2011 HL_{66}	—	May 20, 2010	WISE	WISE	·	4.8 km	MPC · JPL
343869	2011 HF_{69}	—	March 23, 2001	Anderson Mesa	LONEOS	·	750 m	MPC · JPL
343870	2011 HT_{71}	—	February 27, 2006	Kitt Peak	Spacewatch	·	1.6 km	MPC · JPL
343871	2011 HW_{71}	—	February 25, 2006	Kitt Peak	Spacewatch	·	1.7 km	MPC · JPL
343872	2011 HX_{74}	—	January 26, 2006	Kitt Peak	Spacewatch	·	1.9 km	MPC · JPL
343873	2011 HB_{75}	—	July 15, 2007	La Sagra	OAM	DOR	2.3 km	MPC · JPL
343874	2011 HO_{75}	—	September 17, 2003	Kitt Peak	Spacewatch	·	2.0 km	MPC · JPL
343875	2011 HS_{75}	—	September 26, 2005	Kitt Peak	Spacewatch	·	780 m	MPC · JPL
343876	2011 HU_{76}	—	October 7, 2008	Mount Lemmon	Mount Lemmon Survey	·	2.3 km	MPC · JPL
343877	2011 HT_{77}	—	April 1, 2004	Kitt Peak	Spacewatch	·	830 m	MPC · JPL
343878	2011 HX_{78}	—	February 17, 2004	Kitt Peak	Spacewatch	·	1.0 km	MPC · JPL
343879	2011 HP_{79}	—	September 3, 2000	Kitt Peak	Spacewatch	·	1.6 km	MPC · JPL
343880	2011 HR_{80}	—	July 8, 2004	Siding Spring	SSS	MAS	780 m	MPC · JPL
343881	2011 HW_{82}	—	June 11, 2004	Kitt Peak	Spacewatch	·	980 m	MPC · JPL
343882	2011 HA_{83}	—	October 14, 1998	Kitt Peak	Spacewatch	·	870 m	MPC · JPL
343883	2011 HV_{83}	—	February 13, 2007	Mount Lemmon	Mount Lemmon Survey	·	820 m	MPC · JPL
343884	2011 HQ_{84}	—	September 2, 2008	Kitt Peak	Spacewatch	·	1.3 km	MPC · JPL
343885	2011 HQ_{85}	—	September 24, 2008	Kitt Peak	Spacewatch	·	1.9 km	MPC · JPL
343886	2011 HL_{90}	—	May 4, 2000	Apache Point	SDSS	·	1.3 km	MPC · JPL
343887	2011 HQ_{90}	—	January 7, 2010	Mount Lemmon	Mount Lemmon Survey	·	1.6 km	MPC · JPL
343888	2011 HT_{90}	—	February 6, 2007	Kitt Peak	Spacewatch	·	1.0 km	MPC · JPL
343889	2011 HT_{93}	—	December 18, 2009	Mount Lemmon	Mount Lemmon Survey	·	1.4 km	MPC · JPL
343890	2011 HZ_{94}	—	December 19, 2004	Mount Lemmon	Mount Lemmon Survey	·	2.3 km	MPC · JPL
343891	2011 HZ_{96}	—	October 23, 2003	Apache Point	SDSS	GEF	1.1 km	MPC · JPL
343892	2011 HK_{97}	—	July 31, 2005	Palomar	NEAT	·	950 m	MPC · JPL
343893	2011 HG_{100}	—	September 19, 2008	Kitt Peak	Spacewatch	·	2.0 km	MPC · JPL
343894	2011 JH_{2}	—	March 1, 2011	Mount Lemmon	Mount Lemmon Survey	BRG	2.0 km	MPC · JPL
343895	2011 JC_{5}	—	January 27, 2007	Mount Lemmon	Mount Lemmon Survey	·	1.5 km	MPC · JPL
343896	2011 JK_{8}	—	May 6, 2011	Mount Lemmon	Mount Lemmon Survey	L5	9.9 km	MPC · JPL
343897	2011 JK_{9}	—	May 7, 2006	Kitt Peak	Spacewatch	EOS	2.0 km	MPC · JPL
343898	2011 JT_{11}	—	December 24, 2005	Kitt Peak	Spacewatch	·	1.4 km	MPC · JPL
343899	2011 JW_{11}	—	October 25, 2008	Kitt Peak	Spacewatch	EOS	2.8 km	MPC · JPL
343900	2011 JD_{12}	—	October 14, 2003	Anderson Mesa	LONEOS	·	3.3 km	MPC · JPL

== 343901–344000 ==
back to top

Designation			Discovery			Properties		Ref
Permanent	Provisional	Named after	Date	Site	Discoverer(s)	Category	Diam.	Ref
343901	2011 JE_{12}	—	October 29, 2003	Kitt Peak	Spacewatch	DOR	3.4 km	MPC · JPL
343902	2011 JF_{12}	—	November 10, 2009	Kitt Peak	Spacewatch	·	1.0 km	MPC · JPL
343903	2011 JQ_{13}	—	November 27, 2000	Kitt Peak	Spacewatch	BAR	2.3 km	MPC · JPL
343904	2011 JO_{17}	—	July 3, 2003	Kitt Peak	Spacewatch	·	1.5 km	MPC · JPL
343905	2011 JR_{17}	—	July 18, 2006	Siding Spring	SSS	·	4.1 km	MPC · JPL
343906	2011 JY_{24}	—	May 9, 2007	Kitt Peak	Spacewatch	·	1.4 km	MPC · JPL
343907	2011 JZ_{24}	—	August 25, 1995	Kitt Peak	Spacewatch	BRG	1.6 km	MPC · JPL
343908	2011 JK_{25}	—	May 1, 2003	Kitt Peak	Spacewatch	·	1.2 km	MPC · JPL
343909	2011 JW_{25}	—	July 24, 2003	Palomar	NEAT	·	1.4 km	MPC · JPL
343910	2011 JZ_{25}	—	September 23, 2008	Mount Lemmon	Mount Lemmon Survey	MAR	930 m	MPC · JPL
343911	2011 JY_{26}	—	May 11, 2007	Mount Lemmon	Mount Lemmon Survey	·	1.1 km	MPC · JPL
343912	2011 JJ_{27}	—	October 25, 2005	Kitt Peak	Spacewatch	·	1.5 km	MPC · JPL
343913	2011 JC_{28}	—	October 5, 2003	Kitt Peak	Spacewatch	GEF	1.8 km	MPC · JPL
343914	2011 JH_{28}	—	February 6, 2002	Socorro	LINEAR	·	1.9 km	MPC · JPL
343915	2011 JR_{28}	—	February 25, 2006	Mount Lemmon	Mount Lemmon Survey	·	1.9 km	MPC · JPL
343916	2011 JE_{29}	—	May 22, 2007	Tiki	S. F. Hönig, Teamo, N.	·	2.0 km	MPC · JPL
343917	2011 JF_{29}	—	October 20, 2008	Kitt Peak	Spacewatch	·	1.9 km	MPC · JPL
343918	2011 JM_{29}	—	August 29, 2006	Anderson Mesa	LONEOS	·	3.6 km	MPC · JPL
343919	2011 JK_{30}	—	January 27, 2003	Palomar	NEAT	·	1.8 km	MPC · JPL
343920	2011 KU	—	January 31, 2006	Kitt Peak	Spacewatch	(5)	1.4 km	MPC · JPL
343921	2011 KB_{1}	—	November 1, 2002	La Palma	A. Fitzsimmons	·	750 m	MPC · JPL
343922	2011 KA_{3}	—	October 24, 2008	Catalina	CSS	KON	3.2 km	MPC · JPL
343923	2011 KQ_{3}	—	August 29, 2005	Palomar	NEAT	·	1.2 km	MPC · JPL
343924	2011 KW_{4}	—	September 13, 2007	Mount Lemmon	Mount Lemmon Survey	·	1.7 km	MPC · JPL
343925	2011 KM_{6}	—	March 14, 2007	Mount Lemmon	Mount Lemmon Survey	·	1.3 km	MPC · JPL
343926	2011 KR_{7}	—	March 11, 2005	Kitt Peak	Spacewatch	·	3.3 km	MPC · JPL
343927	2011 KO_{9}	—	March 26, 1993	Kitt Peak	Spacewatch	·	1.0 km	MPC · JPL
343928	2011 KY_{9}	—	December 9, 2004	Kitt Peak	Spacewatch	·	2.2 km	MPC · JPL
343929	2011 KW_{10}	—	January 2, 2009	Mount Lemmon	Mount Lemmon Survey	·	3.8 km	MPC · JPL
343930	2011 KU_{11}	—	October 21, 2001	Kitt Peak	Spacewatch	·	3.3 km	MPC · JPL
343931	2011 KG_{12}	—	October 9, 2008	Kitt Peak	Spacewatch	·	1.3 km	MPC · JPL
343932	2011 KV_{12}	—	May 4, 2000	Apache Point	SDSS	·	4.4 km	MPC · JPL
343933	2011 KE_{14}	—	July 3, 2003	Kitt Peak	Spacewatch	·	1.5 km	MPC · JPL
343934	2011 KK_{16}	—	November 6, 2005	Kitt Peak	Spacewatch	·	1.5 km	MPC · JPL
343935	2011 KW_{16}	—	April 30, 2000	Haleakala	NEAT	PHO	1.5 km	MPC · JPL
343936	2011 KB_{18}	—	November 25, 2005	Kitt Peak	Spacewatch	·	1.3 km	MPC · JPL
343937	2011 KS_{18}	—	September 24, 2005	Anderson Mesa	LONEOS	·	1.2 km	MPC · JPL
343938	2011 KY_{18}	—	January 5, 2006	Catalina	CSS	·	2.2 km	MPC · JPL
343939	2011 KC_{19}	—	April 15, 2007	Kitt Peak	Spacewatch	·	1.6 km	MPC · JPL
343940	2011 KC_{22}	—	October 27, 2008	Kitt Peak	Spacewatch	·	1.7 km	MPC · JPL
343941	2011 KZ_{22}	—	March 20, 2004	Socorro	LINEAR	·	880 m	MPC · JPL
343942	2011 KG_{23}	—	December 25, 2005	Mount Lemmon	Mount Lemmon Survey	·	1.4 km	MPC · JPL
343943	2011 KQ_{23}	—	April 11, 2007	Siding Spring	SSS	·	1.9 km	MPC · JPL
343944	2011 KX_{23}	—	February 9, 2010	Mount Lemmon	Mount Lemmon Survey	·	3.2 km	MPC · JPL
343945	2011 KG_{25}	—	September 10, 2007	Kitt Peak	Spacewatch	KOR	1.9 km	MPC · JPL
343946	2011 KR_{25}	—	April 13, 2004	Kitt Peak	Spacewatch	·	990 m	MPC · JPL
343947	2011 KX_{25}	—	October 25, 2008	Catalina	CSS	·	2.8 km	MPC · JPL
343948	2011 KW_{26}	—	April 18, 2005	Kitt Peak	Spacewatch	·	2.8 km	MPC · JPL
343949	2011 KT_{27}	—	September 14, 2007	Catalina	CSS	DOR	4.4 km	MPC · JPL
343950	2011 KM_{28}	—	November 9, 2009	Kitt Peak	Spacewatch	·	1.1 km	MPC · JPL
343951	2011 KX_{28}	—	October 22, 2003	Apache Point	SDSS	·	3.7 km	MPC · JPL
343952	2011 KM_{30}	—	September 28, 2003	Kitt Peak	Spacewatch	·	2.6 km	MPC · JPL
343953	2011 KO_{30}	—	August 13, 2004	Palomar	NEAT	·	1.6 km	MPC · JPL
343954	2011 KW_{30}	—	September 10, 2007	Kitt Peak	Spacewatch	·	2.0 km	MPC · JPL
343955	2011 KJ_{32}	—	December 10, 2004	Kitt Peak	Spacewatch	·	1.8 km	MPC · JPL
343956	2011 KD_{33}	—	October 10, 2007	Catalina	CSS	·	3.4 km	MPC · JPL
343957	2011 KQ_{33}	—	April 12, 2002	Palomar	NEAT	·	2.4 km	MPC · JPL
343958	2011 KS_{33}	—	October 3, 2003	Kitt Peak	Spacewatch	·	2.7 km	MPC · JPL
343959	2011 KY_{33}	—	August 5, 2003	Kitt Peak	Spacewatch	·	1.4 km	MPC · JPL
343960	2011 KN_{37}	—	November 4, 1999	Kitt Peak	Spacewatch	EUN	1.1 km	MPC · JPL
343961	2011 KL_{39}	—	December 12, 2004	Kitt Peak	Spacewatch	·	2.0 km	MPC · JPL
343962	2011 KF_{43}	—	March 23, 2006	Kitt Peak	Spacewatch	·	1.9 km	MPC · JPL
343963	2011 KO_{43}	—	November 7, 2008	Mount Lemmon	Mount Lemmon Survey	·	3.0 km	MPC · JPL
343964	2011 KA_{45}	—	September 22, 2008	Kitt Peak	Spacewatch	·	1.8 km	MPC · JPL
343965	2011 KK_{48}	—	September 29, 2005	Mount Lemmon	Mount Lemmon Survey	V	590 m	MPC · JPL
343966	2011 LR	—	April 23, 1998	Socorro	LINEAR	·	2.4 km	MPC · JPL
343967	2011 LK_{1}	—	September 16, 2003	Kitt Peak	Spacewatch	WIT	1 km	MPC · JPL
343968	2011 LC_{11}	—	September 11, 2006	Catalina	CSS	TIR	3.3 km	MPC · JPL
343969	2011 LZ_{11}	—	February 27, 2006	Kitt Peak	Spacewatch	·	1.9 km	MPC · JPL
343970	2011 LK_{12}	—	September 29, 2003	Kitt Peak	Spacewatch	AGN	1.2 km	MPC · JPL
343971	2011 LU_{13}	—	October 22, 2003	Palomar	NEAT	·	2.4 km	MPC · JPL
343972	2011 LL_{14}	—	April 7, 2005	Kitt Peak	Spacewatch	·	3.2 km	MPC · JPL
343973	2011 LA_{15}	—	March 13, 2007	Mount Lemmon	Mount Lemmon Survey	·	1.5 km	MPC · JPL
343974	2011 LU_{15}	—	November 8, 2008	Kitt Peak	Spacewatch	·	1.5 km	MPC · JPL
343975	2011 LC_{20}	—	May 2, 2010	WISE	WISE	L5	10 km	MPC · JPL
343976	2011 LC_{21}	—	January 30, 2006	Kitt Peak	Spacewatch	L5	10 km	MPC · JPL
343977	2011 LG_{21}	—	December 22, 2003	Kitt Peak	Spacewatch	L5	9.3 km	MPC · JPL
343978	2011 LK_{25}	—	October 3, 1999	Kitt Peak	Spacewatch	·	630 m	MPC · JPL
343979	2011 LX_{26}	—	August 16, 2006	Palomar	NEAT	·	5.0 km	MPC · JPL
343980	2011 LZ_{26}	—	January 7, 2006	Kitt Peak	Spacewatch	(18466)	2.7 km	MPC · JPL
343981 Oppenheim	2011 LA_{27}	Oppenheim	March 7, 2010	Taunus	Karge, S., E. Schwab	·	2.6 km	MPC · JPL
343982	2011 MA_{3}	—	November 7, 2008	Mount Lemmon	Mount Lemmon Survey	·	2.3 km	MPC · JPL
343983	2011 MO_{3}	—	March 12, 2010	Kitt Peak	Spacewatch	EOS	2.0 km	MPC · JPL
343984	2011 MS_{5}	—	December 31, 2008	Kitt Peak	Spacewatch	·	3.4 km	MPC · JPL
343985	2011 OX	—	September 26, 2008	Kitt Peak	Spacewatch	·	1.6 km	MPC · JPL
343986	2011 OZ_{8}	—	November 18, 2007	Kitt Peak	Spacewatch	EOS	1.9 km	MPC · JPL
343987	2011 OK_{12}	—	September 16, 2006	Catalina	CSS	·	4.6 km	MPC · JPL
343988	2011 OJ_{18}	—	March 18, 2010	Siding Spring	SSS	MAR	1.5 km	MPC · JPL
343989	2011 OR_{24}	—	October 19, 2006	Catalina	CSS	·	3.9 km	MPC · JPL
343990	2011 OG_{38}	—	August 25, 2004	Kitt Peak	Spacewatch	·	1.3 km	MPC · JPL
343991	2011 OZ_{38}	—	August 13, 2006	Palomar	NEAT	·	3.2 km	MPC · JPL
343992	2011 OP_{53}	—	September 16, 2006	Catalina	CSS	·	4.5 km	MPC · JPL
343993	2011 PW_{8}	—	April 22, 2010	WISE	WISE	L5	12 km	MPC · JPL
343994	2011 PT_{14}	—	September 24, 2000	Kitt Peak	Spacewatch	L5	10 km	MPC · JPL
343995	2011 QG_{3}	—	March 30, 2008	Kitt Peak	Spacewatch	L5	8.5 km	MPC · JPL
343996	2011 QK_{3}	—	July 2, 2011	Kitt Peak	Spacewatch	L5	10 km	MPC · JPL
343997	2011 QA_{6}	—	November 7, 2007	Kitt Peak	Spacewatch	EOS	3.2 km	MPC · JPL
343998	2011 QU_{8}	—	November 19, 2001	Socorro	LINEAR	·	3.9 km	MPC · JPL
343999	2011 QJ_{9}	—	March 2, 2006	Kitt Peak	Spacewatch	L5	9.4 km	MPC · JPL
344000 Astropolis	2011 QQ_{45}	Astropolis	October 7, 2004	Kitt Peak	Spacewatch	V	1.0 km	MPC · JPL

back to top

== See also ==
- Meanings of minor-planet names: 343001–344000
