= Meanings of minor-planet names: 343001–344000 =

As minor planet discoveries are confirmed, they are given a permanent number by the IAU's Minor Planet Center (MPC), and the discoverers can then submit names for them, following the IAU's naming conventions. The list below concerns those minor planets in the specified number-range that have received names, and explains the meanings of those names.

Official naming citations of newly named small Solar System bodies are approved and published in a bulletin by IAU's Working Group for Small Bodies Nomenclature (WGSBN). Before May 2021, citations were published in MPC's Minor Planet Circulars for many decades. Recent citations can also be found on the JPL Small-Body Database (SBDB). Until his death in 2016, German astronomer Lutz D. Schmadel compiled these citations into the Dictionary of Minor Planet Names (DMP) and regularly updated the collection.

Based on Paul Herget's The Names of the Minor Planets, Schmadel also researched the unclear origin of numerous asteroids, most of which had been named prior to World War II. This article incorporates text from this source, which is in the public domain: SBDB New namings may only be added to this list below after official publication as the preannouncement of names is condemned. The WGSBN publishes a comprehensive guideline for the naming rules of non-cometary small Solar System bodies.

== 343001–343100 ==
Named minor planet	Provisional	This minor planet was named for...	Ref · Catalog
343057 Lucaravenni	2009 CB_{20}	Luca Ravenni (1968–2015) was a software analyst and an amateur astronomer. In 1997 he graduated in mathematics with a thesis on gravity-assisted trajectories for space missions. He collaborated with the Torre Luciana Observatory. Name suggested by the Astronomical Observatory of the University of Siena.	JPL · 343057

== 343101–343200 ==
back to top

Named minor planet	Provisional	This minor planet was named for...	Ref · Catalog
343134 Bizet	2009 FG_{5}	Georges Bizet (1838 - 1875) was a French composer of the Romantic era. Bizet achieved few successes before his final work, Carmen, which has become one of the most popular and frequently performed works in the entire opera repertoire.	JPL · 343134
343157 Mindaugas	2009 HH_{68}	Mindaugas (1200–1263), the first known Grand Duke of Lithuania and the King of Lithuania.	JPL · 343157
343158 Marsyas	2009 HC_{82}	Marsyas, a Phrygian Satyr dared oppose Apollo in a musical duel. Marsyas lost when he could not play his flute upside-down. For his hubris he was tied to a tree, flayed, his blood turned into a stream. Marsyas is so named for its unusual retrograde orbit, that which opposes the motion of most solar system objects, Apollos included.	IAU · 343158

== 343201–343300 ==
back to top

Named minor planet	Provisional	This minor planet was named for...	Ref · Catalog
343230 Corsini	2009 WZ_{105}	Enrico Maria Corsini (born 1969) is an astronomer and professor of astrophysics at Padua University in Italy.	JPL · 343230

== 343301–343400 ==
back to top

Named minor planet	Provisional	This minor planet was named for...	Ref · Catalog
343322 Tomskuniver	2010 CK	Tomsk State University is a recognized center of education and science. Founded on 1878 May 28 by a decree of Russian Emperor Alexander II, it was the first university in the Asian part of Russia.	JPL · 343322

== 343401–343500 ==
back to top

Named minor planet	Provisional	This minor planet was named for...	Ref · Catalog
343412 de Boer	2010 CC_{181}	Thomas J. L. de Boer (b. 1983), a Dutch astronomer.	IAU · 343412
343413 Lauratoyama	2010 CX_{181}	Laura Toyama (b. 1965), a Fiscal Support Specialist at the Institute for Astronomy of the University of Hawaiʻi.	IAU · 343413
343438 Gao	2010 DS_{77}	Hua Gao (b. 1992), a Chinese astronomer.	IAU · 343438
343439 Kaukali	2010 DW_{77}	Chris Kaukali (b. 1969), a Fiscal Specialist at the University of Hawaiʻi's Institute for Astronomy.	IAU · 343439
343440 Magnier	2010 DY_{77}	Eugene A. Magnier (b. 1967), an American astronomer.	IAU · 343440
343441 Chienchenglin	2010 DC_{78}	Chien-Cheng Lin (b. 1981), a Taiwanese researcher.	IAU · 343441
343444 Halluzinelle	2010 EW_{20}	"Analoge Halluzinelle", a fictional female robot hologram in the satirical German science fiction TV-series Ijon Tichy: Space Pilot. The role is played by the actress Nora Tschirner. The story is based on The Star Diaries by Stanisław Lem.	JPL · 343444

== 343501–343600 ==
back to top

Named minor planet	Provisional	This minor planet was named for...	Ref · Catalog
343587 Mamuna	2010 GQ_{23}	Nikolai Vladimirovich Mamuna (1956–2016) was an astronomer, teacher and leading lecturer of the Moscow Planetarium. He was artistic director of the Maximachev Planetarium, the author of a number of books and many journal publications, a science fiction writer, a radio and a TV host.	JPL · 343587

== 343601–343700 ==
back to top

Named minor planet	Provisional	This minor planet was named for...	Ref · Catalog
343662 Robmorgan	2010 NM_{16}	Rob Morgan (b. 1973), an American actor.	IAU · 343662
343664 Nataliemainzer	2010 NM_{16}	Natalie Mainzer (born 1978) is an American nurse who has cared for many patients suffering from COVID-19 during the global pandemic.	IAU · 343664

== 343701–343800 ==
back to top

Named minor planet	Provisional	This minor planet was named for...	Ref · Catalog
343743 Kjurkchieva	2011 FY_{16}	Diana Kjurkchieva (born 1952) is a professor in astronomy at the University of Shumen, Bulgaria and current President of the Bulgarian Astronomical Union. She works on the observation and modeling of variable stars, exoplanets and is the leading popularizer of astronomy science in Bulgaria. Name suggested by S. Ibryamov.	JPL · 343743
343774 Samuelhale	2011 FN_{150}	Samuel D. Hale (b. 1942), Chairman and Chief Executive Officer of the Mount Wilson Institute and grandson of Mount Wilson Observatory's founding director, George Ellery Hale.	IAU · 343774

== 343801–343900 ==
back to top

Named minor planet	Provisional	This minor planet was named for...	Ref · Catalog
There are no named minor planets in this number range

== 343901–344000 ==
back to top

Named minor planet	Provisional	This minor planet was named for...	Ref · Catalog
343981 Oppenheim	2011 LA_{27}	Moritz Nathan Oppenheim (1848-1933) and Katharina (von Kuffner) Oppenheim (1862-1933), German-Jewish couple who donated a refractor to the Frankfurt Observatory, and later donated a chair in physics to Goethe University Frankfurt. Both committed suicide after the Nazi Party came to power.	IAU · 343981
344000 Astropolis	2011 QQ_{45}	The Kyiv Club Astropolis, the largest association of amateur astronomers in Ukraine	JPL · 344000

back to top

Preceded by 342,001–343,000	Meanings of minor-planet names List of minor planets: 343,001–344,000	Succeeded by 344,001–345,000
