= Meanings of minor-planet names: 220001–221000 =

As minor planet discoveries are confirmed, they are given a permanent number by the IAU's Minor Planet Center (MPC), and the discoverers can then submit names for them, following the IAU's naming conventions. The list below concerns those minor planets in the specified number-range that have received names, and explains the meanings of those names.

Official naming citations of newly named small Solar System bodies are approved and published in a bulletin by IAU's Working Group for Small Bodies Nomenclature (WGSBN). Before May 2021, citations were published in MPC's Minor Planet Circulars for many decades. Recent citations can also be found on the JPL Small-Body Database (SBDB). Until his death in 2016, German astronomer Lutz D. Schmadel compiled these citations into the Dictionary of Minor Planet Names (DMP) and regularly updated the collection.

Based on Paul Herget's The Names of the Minor Planets, Schmadel also researched the unclear origin of numerous asteroids, most of which had been named prior to World War II. This article incorporates text from this source, which is in the public domain: SBDB New namings may only be added to this list below after official publication as the preannouncement of names is condemned. The WGSBN publishes a comprehensive guideline for the naming rules of non-cometary small Solar System bodies.

== 220001–220100 ==
Named minor planet	Provisional	This minor planet was named for...	Ref · Catalog
There are no named minor planets in this number range

== 220101–220200 ==
back to top

Named minor planet	Provisional	This minor planet was named for...	Ref · Catalog
There are no named minor planets in this number range

== 220201–220300 ==
back to top

Named minor planet	Provisional	This minor planet was named for...	Ref · Catalog
220229 Hegedüs	2002 VW_{139}	Tibor Hegedüs (born 1961), a Hungarian physicist, astronomer, IAU member and director of the Baja Astronomical Observatory	JPL · 220229

== 220301–220400 ==
back to top

Named minor planet	Provisional	This minor planet was named for...	Ref · Catalog
220331 Stevenarnold	2003 FG_{124}	Steven P. Arnold (born 1969), American engineer who served as an executive in space exploration during New Horizons.	JPL · 220331
220346 Nedabehrooz	2003 GR_{51}	Neda Behrooz (born 1986), American engineer who worked on New Horizons.	JPL · 220346

== 220401–220500 ==
back to top

Named minor planet	Provisional	This minor planet was named for...	Ref · Catalog
220418 Golovyno	2003 SL_{221}	The small town of Golovyno, Ukraine, noted for one of Europe's largest labradorite mines	JPL · 220418
220444 Pontusbrandt	2003 WL_{183}	Pontus C. Brandt (born 1969), Swedish-American scientist who worked on New Horizons.	JPL · 220444
220495 Margarethe	2004 DO	Else Margarethe Apitzsch (born 1906), mother of the German discoverer Rolf Apitzsch	JPL · 220495

== 220501–220600 ==
back to top

Named minor planet	Provisional	This minor planet was named for...	Ref · Catalog
There are no named minor planets in this number range

== 220601–220700 ==
back to top

Named minor planet	Provisional	This minor planet was named for...	Ref · Catalog
There are no named minor planets in this number range

== 220701–220800 ==
back to top

Named minor planet	Provisional	This minor planet was named for...	Ref · Catalog
220736 Niihama	2004 TR_{16}	Niihama, the third-largest city in Ehime prefecture, Japan	JPL · 220736

== 220801–220900 ==
back to top

Named minor planet	Provisional	This minor planet was named for...	Ref · Catalog
220886 Lauren-Yuill	2004 XE_{103}	Lauren M. Rankin-Yuill (b. 1986), an American psychologist, artist and dancer.	IAU · 220886

== 220901–221000 ==
back to top

Named minor planet	Provisional	This minor planet was named for...	Ref · Catalog
There are no named minor planets in this number range

back to top

Preceded by 219,001–220,000	Meanings of minor-planet names List of minor planets: 220,001–221,000	Succeeded by 221,001–222,000
