= List of minor planets: 220001–221000 =

The following is a partial list of minor planets, running from minor-planet number 220001 through 221000, inclusive. The primary data for this and other partial lists is based on JPL's "Small-Body Orbital Elements" and data available from the Minor Planet Center. Critical list information is also provided by the MPC, unless otherwise specified from Lowell Observatory. A detailed description of the table's columns and additional sources are given on the main page including a complete list of every page in this series, and a statistical break-up on the dynamical classification of minor planets.

Also see the summary list of all named bodies in numerical and alphabetical order, and the corresponding naming citations for the number range of this particular list. New namings may only be added to this list after official publication, as the preannouncement of names is condemned by the Working Group for Small Bodies Nomenclature of the International Astronomical Union.

| Near-Earth obj. | MBA (inner) | MBA (outer) | Centaur |
| Mars-crosser | MBA (middle) | Jupiter trojan | Trans-Neptunian obj. |
| Unclassified |

== 220001–220100 ==
| Designation | | | Discovery | | | Properties | | Ref |
| Permanent | Provisional | Named after | Date | Site | Discoverer(s) | Category | Diam. | Ref |
|---|---|---|---|---|---|---|---|---|
| 220001 | 2002 PP_{31} | — | August 6, 2002 | Palomar | NEAT | · | 860 m | MPC · JPL |
| 220002 | 2002 PX_{43} | — | August 5, 2002 | Socorro | LINEAR | · | 1.3 km | MPC · JPL |
| 220003 | 2002 PG_{45} | — | August 5, 2002 | Socorro | LINEAR | · | 1.4 km | MPC · JPL |
| 220004 | 2002 PO_{56} | — | August 9, 2002 | Socorro | LINEAR | · | 1.2 km | MPC · JPL |
| 220005 | 2002 PG_{60} | — | August 10, 2002 | Socorro | LINEAR | · | 1.8 km | MPC · JPL |
| 220006 | 2002 PS_{87} | — | August 14, 2002 | Socorro | LINEAR | · | 1.9 km | MPC · JPL |
| 220007 | 2002 PS_{99} | — | August 14, 2002 | Socorro | LINEAR | · | 980 m | MPC · JPL |
| 220008 | 2002 PX_{101} | — | August 12, 2002 | Socorro | LINEAR | · | 1.2 km | MPC · JPL |
| 220009 | 2002 PO_{102} | — | August 12, 2002 | Socorro | LINEAR | PHO | 2.1 km | MPC · JPL |
| 220010 | 2002 PJ_{111} | — | August 14, 2002 | Palomar | NEAT | · | 1.2 km | MPC · JPL |
| 220011 | 2002 PJ_{123} | — | August 15, 2002 | Palomar | NEAT | · | 6.1 km | MPC · JPL |
| 220012 | 2002 PP_{124} | — | August 13, 2002 | Anderson Mesa | LONEOS | · | 1.1 km | MPC · JPL |
| 220013 | 2002 PK_{135} | — | August 14, 2002 | Socorro | LINEAR | · | 870 m | MPC · JPL |
| 220014 | 2002 PG_{137} | — | August 15, 2002 | Anderson Mesa | LONEOS | · | 960 m | MPC · JPL |
| 220015 | 2002 PU_{155} | — | August 8, 2002 | Palomar | S. F. Hönig | · | 1.1 km | MPC · JPL |
| 220016 | 2002 PG_{170} | — | August 14, 2002 | Palomar | NEAT | · | 6.0 km | MPC · JPL |
| 220017 | 2002 PH_{179} | — | August 14, 2002 | Palomar | NEAT | PHO | 1.3 km | MPC · JPL |
| 220018 | 2002 QC_{6} | — | August 17, 2002 | Socorro | LINEAR | · | 3.6 km | MPC · JPL |
| 220019 | 2002 QG_{10} | — | August 24, 2002 | Palomar | NEAT | (2076) | 1.8 km | MPC · JPL |
| 220020 | 2002 QF_{12} | — | August 26, 2002 | Palomar | NEAT | · | 1.1 km | MPC · JPL |
| 220021 | 2002 QB_{16} | — | August 28, 2002 | Socorro | LINEAR | · | 1.5 km | MPC · JPL |
| 220022 | 2002 QN_{23} | — | August 28, 2002 | Palomar | NEAT | · | 1.1 km | MPC · JPL |
| 220023 | 2002 QQ_{43} | — | August 30, 2002 | Palomar | NEAT | · | 1.3 km | MPC · JPL |
| 220024 | 2002 QH_{47} | — | August 30, 2002 | Anderson Mesa | LONEOS | · | 1.3 km | MPC · JPL |
| 220025 | 2002 QW_{53} | — | August 28, 2002 | Palomar | R. Matson | · | 860 m | MPC · JPL |
| 220026 | 2002 QG_{55} | — | August 17, 2002 | Palomar | Lowe, A. | · | 1.1 km | MPC · JPL |
| 220027 | 2002 QJ_{57} | — | August 17, 2002 | Palomar | Lowe, A. | · | 930 m | MPC · JPL |
| 220028 | 2002 QT_{89} | — | August 30, 2002 | Palomar | NEAT | · | 910 m | MPC · JPL |
| 220029 | 2002 QC_{100} | — | August 18, 2002 | Palomar | NEAT | · | 880 m | MPC · JPL |
| 220030 | 2002 QZ_{102} | — | August 29, 2002 | Palomar | NEAT | · | 1.1 km | MPC · JPL |
| 220031 | 2002 QF_{107} | — | August 17, 2002 | Palomar | NEAT | · | 820 m | MPC · JPL |
| 220032 | 2002 QO_{108} | — | August 17, 2002 | Palomar | NEAT | · | 730 m | MPC · JPL |
| 220033 | 2002 QB_{128} | — | August 29, 2002 | Palomar | NEAT | · | 760 m | MPC · JPL |
| 220034 | 2002 RZ_{2} | — | September 4, 2002 | Anderson Mesa | LONEOS | · | 1.0 km | MPC · JPL |
| 220035 | 2002 RM_{6} | — | September 1, 2002 | Haleakala | NEAT | fast | 950 m | MPC · JPL |
| 220036 | 2002 RN_{9} | — | September 4, 2002 | Palomar | NEAT | · | 1.1 km | MPC · JPL |
| 220037 | 2002 RT_{35} | — | September 5, 2002 | Anderson Mesa | LONEOS | V | 970 m | MPC · JPL |
| 220038 | 2002 RW_{40} | — | September 5, 2002 | Socorro | LINEAR | · | 870 m | MPC · JPL |
| 220039 | 2002 RY_{42} | — | September 5, 2002 | Socorro | LINEAR | · | 1.1 km | MPC · JPL |
| 220040 | 2002 RO_{55} | — | September 5, 2002 | Anderson Mesa | LONEOS | · | 1.1 km | MPC · JPL |
| 220041 | 2002 RD_{59} | — | September 5, 2002 | Anderson Mesa | LONEOS | · | 1.2 km | MPC · JPL |
| 220042 | 2002 RF_{67} | — | September 3, 2002 | Palomar | NEAT | · | 1.4 km | MPC · JPL |
| 220043 | 2002 RB_{69} | — | September 4, 2002 | Anderson Mesa | LONEOS | (2076) | 1.2 km | MPC · JPL |
| 220044 | 2002 RO_{70} | — | September 4, 2002 | Palomar | NEAT | · | 1.4 km | MPC · JPL |
| 220045 | 2002 RP_{73} | — | September 5, 2002 | Socorro | LINEAR | V | 980 m | MPC · JPL |
| 220046 | 2002 RP_{79} | — | September 5, 2002 | Socorro | LINEAR | · | 1.1 km | MPC · JPL |
| 220047 | 2002 RB_{84} | — | September 5, 2002 | Socorro | LINEAR | · | 2.3 km | MPC · JPL |
| 220048 | 2002 RC_{84} | — | September 5, 2002 | Socorro | LINEAR | V | 1.0 km | MPC · JPL |
| 220049 | 2002 RS_{86} | — | September 5, 2002 | Socorro | LINEAR | · | 2.1 km | MPC · JPL |
| 220050 | 2002 RU_{93} | — | September 5, 2002 | Anderson Mesa | LONEOS | · | 1.2 km | MPC · JPL |
| 220051 | 2002 RH_{94} | — | September 5, 2002 | Socorro | LINEAR | ERI | 2.3 km | MPC · JPL |
| 220052 | 2002 RY_{101} | — | September 5, 2002 | Socorro | LINEAR | · | 1.6 km | MPC · JPL |
| 220053 | 2002 RU_{104} | — | September 5, 2002 | Socorro | LINEAR | V | 1.3 km | MPC · JPL |
| 220054 | 2002 RL_{109} | — | September 6, 2002 | Socorro | LINEAR | · | 800 m | MPC · JPL |
| 220055 | 2002 RF_{110} | — | September 6, 2002 | Socorro | LINEAR | · | 1.2 km | MPC · JPL |
| 220056 | 2002 RR_{113} | — | September 5, 2002 | Socorro | LINEAR | · | 930 m | MPC · JPL |
| 220057 | 2002 RQ_{114} | — | September 5, 2002 | Socorro | LINEAR | · | 1.1 km | MPC · JPL |
| 220058 | 2002 RM_{121} | — | September 7, 2002 | Socorro | LINEAR | · | 1.6 km | MPC · JPL |
| 220059 | 2002 RO_{122} | — | September 8, 2002 | Haleakala | NEAT | V | 830 m | MPC · JPL |
| 220060 | 2002 RT_{136} | — | September 11, 2002 | Haleakala | NEAT | · | 1.3 km | MPC · JPL |
| 220061 | 2002 RA_{141} | — | September 10, 2002 | Palomar | NEAT | · | 1.6 km | MPC · JPL |
| 220062 | 2002 RY_{143} | — | September 11, 2002 | Palomar | NEAT | · | 890 m | MPC · JPL |
| 220063 | 2002 RF_{144} | — | September 11, 2002 | Palomar | NEAT | · | 1.2 km | MPC · JPL |
| 220064 | 2002 RX_{145} | — | September 11, 2002 | Palomar | NEAT | · | 1.4 km | MPC · JPL |
| 220065 | 2002 RX_{151} | — | September 12, 2002 | Palomar | NEAT | · | 880 m | MPC · JPL |
| 220066 | 2002 RD_{153} | — | September 12, 2002 | Palomar | NEAT | V | 910 m | MPC · JPL |
| 220067 | 2002 RP_{153} | — | September 12, 2002 | Palomar | NEAT | · | 1.7 km | MPC · JPL |
| 220068 | 2002 RX_{154} | — | September 10, 2002 | Haleakala | NEAT | · | 1.6 km | MPC · JPL |
| 220069 | 2002 RJ_{156} | — | September 11, 2002 | Palomar | NEAT | · | 1.1 km | MPC · JPL |
| 220070 | 2002 RT_{160} | — | September 12, 2002 | Palomar | NEAT | · | 1.0 km | MPC · JPL |
| 220071 | 2002 RX_{161} | — | September 12, 2002 | Palomar | NEAT | · | 970 m | MPC · JPL |
| 220072 | 2002 RY_{166} | — | September 13, 2002 | Palomar | NEAT | · | 980 m | MPC · JPL |
| 220073 | 2002 RH_{174} | — | September 13, 2002 | Palomar | NEAT | · | 960 m | MPC · JPL |
| 220074 | 2002 RB_{194} | — | September 12, 2002 | Palomar | NEAT | V | 870 m | MPC · JPL |
| 220075 | 2002 RT_{201} | — | September 13, 2002 | Socorro | LINEAR | · | 2.4 km | MPC · JPL |
| 220076 | 2002 RF_{209} | — | September 14, 2002 | Palomar | NEAT | · | 1.1 km | MPC · JPL |
| 220077 | 2002 RK_{209} | — | September 14, 2002 | Palomar | NEAT | · | 1.1 km | MPC · JPL |
| 220078 | 2002 RK_{212} | — | September 15, 2002 | Haleakala | NEAT | · | 1.6 km | MPC · JPL |
| 220079 | 2002 RB_{216} | — | September 13, 2002 | Socorro | LINEAR | · | 1.0 km | MPC · JPL |
| 220080 | 2002 RX_{222} | — | September 15, 2002 | Haleakala | NEAT | · | 960 m | MPC · JPL |
| 220081 | 2002 RC_{230} | — | September 14, 2002 | Haleakala | NEAT | · | 1.3 km | MPC · JPL |
| 220082 | 2002 RY_{243} | — | September 14, 2002 | Palomar | NEAT | · | 920 m | MPC · JPL |
| 220083 | 2002 RN_{273} | — | September 4, 2002 | Palomar | NEAT | · | 970 m | MPC · JPL |
| 220084 | 2002 SQ_{1} | — | September 26, 2002 | Palomar | NEAT | · | 970 m | MPC · JPL |
| 220085 | 2002 SH_{6} | — | September 27, 2002 | Palomar | NEAT | V | 1.1 km | MPC · JPL |
| 220086 | 2002 ST_{6} | — | September 27, 2002 | Palomar | NEAT | (2076) | 1.3 km | MPC · JPL |
| 220087 | 2002 SG_{10} | — | September 27, 2002 | Palomar | NEAT | NYS | 1.2 km | MPC · JPL |
| 220088 | 2002 SB_{16} | — | September 27, 2002 | Palomar | NEAT | · | 4.7 km | MPC · JPL |
| 220089 | 2002 SF_{20} | — | September 26, 2002 | Palomar | NEAT | · | 1.1 km | MPC · JPL |
| 220090 | 2002 SH_{31} | — | September 28, 2002 | Haleakala | NEAT | · | 1.7 km | MPC · JPL |
| 220091 | 2002 ST_{33} | — | September 28, 2002 | Haleakala | NEAT | · | 1.3 km | MPC · JPL |
| 220092 | 2002 SM_{37} | — | September 29, 2002 | Haleakala | NEAT | · | 1.0 km | MPC · JPL |
| 220093 | 2002 SJ_{38} | — | September 30, 2002 | Socorro | LINEAR | · | 1.6 km | MPC · JPL |
| 220094 | 2002 SC_{41} | — | September 30, 2002 | Haleakala | NEAT | V | 990 m | MPC · JPL |
| 220095 | 2002 SU_{41} | — | September 28, 2002 | Haleakala | NEAT | · | 640 m | MPC · JPL |
| 220096 | 2002 SR_{42} | — | September 28, 2002 | Haleakala | NEAT | NYS | 1.0 km | MPC · JPL |
| 220097 | 2002 SM_{45} | — | September 29, 2002 | Kitt Peak | Spacewatch | NYS | 1.1 km | MPC · JPL |
| 220098 | 2002 SG_{48} | — | September 30, 2002 | Socorro | LINEAR | · | 1.3 km | MPC · JPL |
| 220099 | 2002 SG_{49} | — | September 30, 2002 | Socorro | LINEAR | · | 1.6 km | MPC · JPL |
| 220100 | 2002 SC_{55} | — | September 30, 2002 | Haleakala | NEAT | · | 1.1 km | MPC · JPL |

== 220101–220200 ==
back to top

| Designation | | | Discovery | | | Properties | | Ref |
| Permanent | Provisional | Named after | Date | Site | Discoverer(s) | Category | Diam. | Ref |
|---|---|---|---|---|---|---|---|---|
| 220101 | 2002 SK_{57} | — | September 30, 2002 | Haleakala | NEAT | · | 1.1 km | MPC · JPL |
| 220102 | 2002 SX_{63} | — | September 16, 2002 | Palomar | NEAT | · | 1.1 km | MPC · JPL |
| 220103 | 2002 TK_{14} | — | October 1, 2002 | Haleakala | NEAT | V | 1.1 km | MPC · JPL |
| 220104 | 2002 TY_{17} | — | October 2, 2002 | Socorro | LINEAR | · | 950 m | MPC · JPL |
| 220105 | 2002 TL_{20} | — | October 2, 2002 | Socorro | LINEAR | · | 2.3 km | MPC · JPL |
| 220106 | 2002 TE_{25} | — | October 2, 2002 | Socorro | LINEAR | · | 1.6 km | MPC · JPL |
| 220107 | 2002 TN_{25} | — | October 2, 2002 | Socorro | LINEAR | · | 1.2 km | MPC · JPL |
| 220108 | 2002 TZ_{25} | — | October 2, 2002 | Socorro | LINEAR | · | 1.4 km | MPC · JPL |
| 220109 | 2002 TJ_{29} | — | October 2, 2002 | Socorro | LINEAR | NYS | 1.2 km | MPC · JPL |
| 220110 | 2002 TF_{32} | — | October 2, 2002 | Socorro | LINEAR | · | 1.7 km | MPC · JPL |
| 220111 | 2002 TH_{32} | — | October 2, 2002 | Socorro | LINEAR | · | 1.8 km | MPC · JPL |
| 220112 | 2002 TZ_{32} | — | October 2, 2002 | Socorro | LINEAR | · | 1.4 km | MPC · JPL |
| 220113 | 2002 TF_{38} | — | October 2, 2002 | Socorro | LINEAR | · | 1.2 km | MPC · JPL |
| 220114 | 2002 TF_{39} | — | October 2, 2002 | Socorro | LINEAR | · | 2.0 km | MPC · JPL |
| 220115 | 2002 TC_{40} | — | October 2, 2002 | Socorro | LINEAR | · | 1.8 km | MPC · JPL |
| 220116 | 2002 TU_{44} | — | October 2, 2002 | Socorro | LINEAR | V | 980 m | MPC · JPL |
| 220117 | 2002 TQ_{46} | — | October 2, 2002 | Socorro | LINEAR | PHO | 1.2 km | MPC · JPL |
| 220118 | 2002 TO_{47} | — | October 2, 2002 | Socorro | LINEAR | · | 1.5 km | MPC · JPL |
| 220119 | 2002 TV_{47} | — | October 2, 2002 | Socorro | LINEAR | · | 2.2 km | MPC · JPL |
| 220120 | 2002 TU_{52} | — | October 2, 2002 | Socorro | LINEAR | · | 1.1 km | MPC · JPL |
| 220121 | 2002 TL_{57} | — | October 2, 2002 | Socorro | LINEAR | · | 2.2 km | MPC · JPL |
| 220122 | 2002 TJ_{58} | — | October 1, 2002 | Anderson Mesa | LONEOS | · | 1.4 km | MPC · JPL |
| 220123 | 2002 TR_{60} | — | October 5, 2002 | Socorro | LINEAR | · | 3.1 km | MPC · JPL |
| 220124 | 2002 TE_{66} | — | October 5, 2002 | Socorro | LINEAR | APO | 610 m | MPC · JPL |
| 220125 | 2002 TT_{66} | — | October 6, 2002 | Socorro | LINEAR | PHO | 1.4 km | MPC · JPL |
| 220126 | 2002 TT_{71} | — | October 3, 2002 | Palomar | NEAT | · | 1.6 km | MPC · JPL |
| 220127 | 2002 TD_{77} | — | October 1, 2002 | Anderson Mesa | LONEOS | · | 1.0 km | MPC · JPL |
| 220128 | 2002 TG_{77} | — | October 1, 2002 | Anderson Mesa | LONEOS | · | 2.5 km | MPC · JPL |
| 220129 | 2002 TX_{77} | — | October 1, 2002 | Anderson Mesa | LONEOS | · | 1.2 km | MPC · JPL |
| 220130 | 2002 TB_{78} | — | October 1, 2002 | Anderson Mesa | LONEOS | · | 1.2 km | MPC · JPL |
| 220131 | 2002 TF_{81} | — | October 1, 2002 | Socorro | LINEAR | · | 1.8 km | MPC · JPL |
| 220132 | 2002 TO_{87} | — | October 3, 2002 | Socorro | LINEAR | · | 1.6 km | MPC · JPL |
| 220133 | 2002 TO_{90} | — | October 3, 2002 | Palomar | NEAT | V | 1.1 km | MPC · JPL |
| 220134 | 2002 TL_{98} | — | October 3, 2002 | Socorro | LINEAR | · | 900 m | MPC · JPL |
| 220135 | 2002 TX_{102} | — | October 4, 2002 | Socorro | LINEAR | · | 1.4 km | MPC · JPL |
| 220136 | 2002 TS_{104} | — | October 4, 2002 | Socorro | LINEAR | · | 1.8 km | MPC · JPL |
| 220137 | 2002 TH_{112} | — | October 3, 2002 | Socorro | LINEAR | · | 1.2 km | MPC · JPL |
| 220138 | 2002 TV_{114} | — | October 3, 2002 | Palomar | NEAT | V | 1.2 km | MPC · JPL |
| 220139 | 2002 TW_{119} | — | October 3, 2002 | Palomar | NEAT | · | 1.6 km | MPC · JPL |
| 220140 | 2002 TG_{128} | — | October 4, 2002 | Palomar | NEAT | · | 1.5 km | MPC · JPL |
| 220141 | 2002 TA_{130} | — | October 4, 2002 | Palomar | NEAT | V | 1.1 km | MPC · JPL |
| 220142 | 2002 TC_{133} | — | October 4, 2002 | Socorro | LINEAR | · | 1.2 km | MPC · JPL |
| 220143 | 2002 TO_{134} | — | October 4, 2002 | Palomar | NEAT | V | 1.0 km | MPC · JPL |
| 220144 | 2002 TP_{134} | — | October 4, 2002 | Palomar | NEAT | V | 990 m | MPC · JPL |
| 220145 | 2002 TU_{147} | — | October 4, 2002 | Palomar | NEAT | · | 1.1 km | MPC · JPL |
| 220146 | 2002 TW_{156} | — | October 5, 2002 | Palomar | NEAT | V | 750 m | MPC · JPL |
| 220147 | 2002 TQ_{162} | — | October 5, 2002 | Palomar | NEAT | · | 1.6 km | MPC · JPL |
| 220148 | 2002 TK_{170} | — | October 3, 2002 | Palomar | NEAT | · | 2.8 km | MPC · JPL |
| 220149 | 2002 TQ_{170} | — | October 3, 2002 | Palomar | NEAT | CYB | 8.2 km | MPC · JPL |
| 220150 | 2002 TQ_{197} | — | October 4, 2002 | Socorro | LINEAR | · | 1.3 km | MPC · JPL |
| 220151 | 2002 TY_{197} | — | October 4, 2002 | Socorro | LINEAR | · | 2.2 km | MPC · JPL |
| 220152 | 2002 TR_{200} | — | October 4, 2002 | Socorro | LINEAR | · | 1.3 km | MPC · JPL |
| 220153 | 2002 TF_{206} | — | October 4, 2002 | Socorro | LINEAR | · | 1.8 km | MPC · JPL |
| 220154 | 2002 TZ_{214} | — | October 4, 2002 | Socorro | LINEAR | ERI | 2.1 km | MPC · JPL |
| 220155 | 2002 TZ_{219} | — | October 5, 2002 | Socorro | LINEAR | · | 1.6 km | MPC · JPL |
| 220156 | 2002 TN_{221} | — | October 6, 2002 | Socorro | LINEAR | · | 1.8 km | MPC · JPL |
| 220157 | 2002 TK_{228} | — | October 6, 2002 | Haleakala | NEAT | · | 1.2 km | MPC · JPL |
| 220158 | 2002 TJ_{243} | — | October 9, 2002 | Kitt Peak | Spacewatch | · | 1.7 km | MPC · JPL |
| 220159 | 2002 TV_{247} | — | October 10, 2002 | Socorro | LINEAR | · | 1.0 km | MPC · JPL |
| 220160 | 2002 TA_{251} | — | October 7, 2002 | Socorro | LINEAR | V | 1.0 km | MPC · JPL |
| 220161 | 2002 TD_{252} | — | October 8, 2002 | Anderson Mesa | LONEOS | · | 1.5 km | MPC · JPL |
| 220162 | 2002 TW_{254} | — | October 9, 2002 | Anderson Mesa | LONEOS | · | 1.1 km | MPC · JPL |
| 220163 | 2002 TF_{258} | — | October 9, 2002 | Socorro | LINEAR | · | 1.2 km | MPC · JPL |
| 220164 | 2002 TQ_{270} | — | October 9, 2002 | Socorro | LINEAR | · | 900 m | MPC · JPL |
| 220165 | 2002 TF_{271} | — | October 9, 2002 | Socorro | LINEAR | · | 2.1 km | MPC · JPL |
| 220166 | 2002 TF_{274} | — | October 9, 2002 | Socorro | LINEAR | · | 1.6 km | MPC · JPL |
| 220167 | 2002 TV_{280} | — | October 10, 2002 | Socorro | LINEAR | · | 1.4 km | MPC · JPL |
| 220168 | 2002 TL_{282} | — | October 10, 2002 | Socorro | LINEAR | · | 1.8 km | MPC · JPL |
| 220169 | 2002 TY_{283} | — | October 10, 2002 | Socorro | LINEAR | · | 930 m | MPC · JPL |
| 220170 | 2002 TW_{284} | — | October 10, 2002 | Socorro | LINEAR | · | 2.0 km | MPC · JPL |
| 220171 | 2002 TB_{285} | — | October 10, 2002 | Socorro | LINEAR | · | 1.8 km | MPC · JPL |
| 220172 | 2002 TA_{298} | — | October 12, 2002 | Socorro | LINEAR | · | 1.6 km | MPC · JPL |
| 220173 | 2002 TE_{302} | — | October 4, 2002 | Socorro | LINEAR | V | 1.2 km | MPC · JPL |
| 220174 | 2002 TH_{323} | — | October 5, 2002 | Apache Point | SDSS | · | 930 m | MPC · JPL |
| 220175 | 2002 TK_{335} | — | October 5, 2002 | Apache Point | SDSS | · | 1.3 km | MPC · JPL |
| 220176 | 2002 TY_{376} | — | October 15, 2002 | Palomar | NEAT | V | 880 m | MPC · JPL |
| 220177 | 2002 UT_{5} | — | October 28, 2002 | Palomar | NEAT | · | 3.0 km | MPC · JPL |
| 220178 | 2002 UJ_{7} | — | October 28, 2002 | Palomar | NEAT | · | 1.8 km | MPC · JPL |
| 220179 | 2002 UM_{10} | — | October 28, 2002 | Haleakala | NEAT | NYS | 1.6 km | MPC · JPL |
| 220180 | 2002 UC_{17} | — | October 29, 2002 | Palomar | NEAT | PHO | 2.4 km | MPC · JPL |
| 220181 | 2002 UY_{27} | — | October 28, 2002 | Haleakala | NEAT | · | 2.3 km | MPC · JPL |
| 220182 | 2002 UD_{34} | — | October 31, 2002 | Anderson Mesa | LONEOS | · | 1.4 km | MPC · JPL |
| 220183 | 2002 UO_{39} | — | October 31, 2002 | Palomar | NEAT | HYG | 5.1 km | MPC · JPL |
| 220184 | 2002 UR_{52} | — | October 29, 2002 | Apache Point | SDSS | · | 1.1 km | MPC · JPL |
| 220185 | 2002 UA_{57} | — | October 29, 2002 | Apache Point | SDSS | · | 2.4 km | MPC · JPL |
| 220186 | 2002 UH_{71} | — | October 29, 2002 | Palomar | NEAT | · | 1.2 km | MPC · JPL |
| 220187 | 2002 UZ_{72} | — | October 30, 2002 | Palomar | NEAT | · | 1.6 km | MPC · JPL |
| 220188 | 2002 VF_{3} | — | November 1, 2002 | Palomar | NEAT | · | 2.0 km | MPC · JPL |
| 220189 | 2002 VR_{4} | — | November 4, 2002 | Palomar | NEAT | · | 1.1 km | MPC · JPL |
| 220190 | 2002 VM_{8} | — | November 1, 2002 | Palomar | NEAT | · | 1.5 km | MPC · JPL |
| 220191 | 2002 VS_{8} | — | November 1, 2002 | Palomar | NEAT | EOS | 2.9 km | MPC · JPL |
| 220192 | 2002 VL_{11} | — | November 1, 2002 | Palomar | NEAT | NYS | 1.8 km | MPC · JPL |
| 220193 | 2002 VZ_{16} | — | November 5, 2002 | Socorro | LINEAR | · | 1.4 km | MPC · JPL |
| 220194 | 2002 VK_{17} | — | November 5, 2002 | Socorro | LINEAR | · | 2.2 km | MPC · JPL |
| 220195 | 2002 VF_{20} | — | November 4, 2002 | Haleakala | NEAT | · | 1.7 km | MPC · JPL |
| 220196 | 2002 VH_{20} | — | November 4, 2002 | Haleakala | NEAT | · | 1.8 km | MPC · JPL |
| 220197 | 2002 VO_{21} | — | November 5, 2002 | Socorro | LINEAR | · | 2.0 km | MPC · JPL |
| 220198 | 2002 VG_{23} | — | November 5, 2002 | Socorro | LINEAR | NYS | 1.0 km | MPC · JPL |
| 220199 | 2002 VK_{23} | — | November 5, 2002 | Socorro | LINEAR | NYS | 1.6 km | MPC · JPL |
| 220200 | 2002 VU_{23} | — | November 5, 2002 | Socorro | LINEAR | · | 1.7 km | MPC · JPL |

== 220201–220300 ==
back to top

| Designation | | | Discovery | | | Properties | | Ref |
| Permanent | Provisional | Named after | Date | Site | Discoverer(s) | Category | Diam. | Ref |
|---|---|---|---|---|---|---|---|---|
| 220201 | 2002 VK_{24} | — | November 5, 2002 | Socorro | LINEAR | · | 1.4 km | MPC · JPL |
| 220202 | 2002 VZ_{25} | — | November 5, 2002 | Socorro | LINEAR | NYS | 1.4 km | MPC · JPL |
| 220203 | 2002 VA_{26} | — | November 5, 2002 | Socorro | LINEAR | · | 1.1 km | MPC · JPL |
| 220204 | 2002 VP_{26} | — | November 5, 2002 | Socorro | LINEAR | · | 1.0 km | MPC · JPL |
| 220205 | 2002 VH_{30} | — | November 5, 2002 | Socorro | LINEAR | V | 950 m | MPC · JPL |
| 220206 | 2002 VY_{37} | — | November 5, 2002 | Socorro | LINEAR | · | 2.0 km | MPC · JPL |
| 220207 | 2002 VY_{40} | — | November 1, 2002 | Palomar | NEAT | · | 1.1 km | MPC · JPL |
| 220208 | 2002 VT_{44} | — | November 4, 2002 | Haleakala | NEAT | · | 2.1 km | MPC · JPL |
| 220209 | 2002 VY_{47} | — | November 5, 2002 | Socorro | LINEAR | · | 1.3 km | MPC · JPL |
| 220210 | 2002 VO_{48} | — | November 5, 2002 | Socorro | LINEAR | · | 2.1 km | MPC · JPL |
| 220211 | 2002 VJ_{54} | — | November 6, 2002 | Socorro | LINEAR | · | 2.2 km | MPC · JPL |
| 220212 | 2002 VD_{64} | — | November 6, 2002 | Anderson Mesa | LONEOS | · | 2.2 km | MPC · JPL |
| 220213 | 2002 VY_{76} | — | November 7, 2002 | Socorro | LINEAR | · | 1.8 km | MPC · JPL |
| 220214 | 2002 VW_{78} | — | November 7, 2002 | Socorro | LINEAR | · | 1.4 km | MPC · JPL |
| 220215 | 2002 VF_{87} | — | November 8, 2002 | Socorro | LINEAR | · | 1.5 km | MPC · JPL |
| 220216 | 2002 VG_{88} | — | November 11, 2002 | Socorro | LINEAR | NYS | 1.2 km | MPC · JPL |
| 220217 | 2002 VS_{89} | — | November 11, 2002 | Palomar | NEAT | · | 1.7 km | MPC · JPL |
| 220218 | 2002 VL_{97} | — | November 12, 2002 | Socorro | LINEAR | · | 2.4 km | MPC · JPL |
| 220219 | 2002 VM_{99} | — | November 13, 2002 | Socorro | LINEAR | · | 1.9 km | MPC · JPL |
| 220220 | 2002 VV_{99} | — | November 13, 2002 | Socorro | LINEAR | H | 1.1 km | MPC · JPL |
| 220221 | 2002 VA_{100} | — | November 10, 2002 | Socorro | LINEAR | · | 1.9 km | MPC · JPL |
| 220222 | 2002 VQ_{107} | — | November 12, 2002 | Socorro | LINEAR | · | 1.9 km | MPC · JPL |
| 220223 | 2002 VM_{108} | — | November 12, 2002 | Socorro | LINEAR | · | 1.5 km | MPC · JPL |
| 220224 | 2002 VJ_{111} | — | November 13, 2002 | Socorro | LINEAR | · | 1.4 km | MPC · JPL |
| 220225 | 2002 VH_{123} | — | November 13, 2002 | Palomar | NEAT | · | 3.3 km | MPC · JPL |
| 220226 | 2002 VC_{126} | — | November 15, 2002 | Palomar | NEAT | · | 2.2 km | MPC · JPL |
| 220227 | 2002 VO_{126} | — | November 12, 2002 | Socorro | LINEAR | · | 1.7 km | MPC · JPL |
| 220228 | 2002 VQ_{134} | — | November 6, 2002 | Socorro | LINEAR | NYS | 1.1 km | MPC · JPL |
| 220229 Hegedüs | 2002 VW_{139} | Hegedüs | November 1, 2002 | Palomar | NEAT | · | 1.5 km | MPC · JPL |
| 220230 | 2002 VT_{143} | — | November 4, 2002 | Palomar | NEAT | NYS | 1.8 km | MPC · JPL |
| 220231 | 2002 WC_{2} | — | November 23, 2002 | Palomar | NEAT | · | 1.7 km | MPC · JPL |
| 220232 | 2002 WA_{10} | — | November 24, 2002 | Palomar | NEAT | NYS | 1.2 km | MPC · JPL |
| 220233 | 2002 WU_{14} | — | November 28, 2002 | Anderson Mesa | LONEOS | · | 1.5 km | MPC · JPL |
| 220234 | 2002 WY_{23} | — | November 24, 2002 | Palomar | NEAT | · | 1.5 km | MPC · JPL |
| 220235 | 2002 XK_{3} | — | December 1, 2002 | Socorro | LINEAR | NYS | 1.4 km | MPC · JPL |
| 220236 | 2002 XS_{8} | — | December 2, 2002 | Socorro | LINEAR | · | 1.2 km | MPC · JPL |
| 220237 | 2002 XC_{13} | — | December 3, 2002 | Haleakala | NEAT | · | 860 m | MPC · JPL |
| 220238 | 2002 XS_{13} | — | December 3, 2002 | Palomar | NEAT | NYS | 1.4 km | MPC · JPL |
| 220239 | 2002 XG_{15} | — | December 2, 2002 | Socorro | LINEAR | slow | 4.5 km | MPC · JPL |
| 220240 | 2002 XF_{23} | — | December 5, 2002 | Socorro | LINEAR | · | 1.5 km | MPC · JPL |
| 220241 | 2002 XF_{25} | — | December 5, 2002 | Socorro | LINEAR | · | 1.9 km | MPC · JPL |
| 220242 | 2002 XY_{28} | — | December 5, 2002 | Socorro | LINEAR | MAS | 910 m | MPC · JPL |
| 220243 | 2002 XJ_{31} | — | December 6, 2002 | Socorro | LINEAR | · | 1.5 km | MPC · JPL |
| 220244 | 2002 XV_{42} | — | December 8, 2002 | Desert Eagle | W. K. Y. Yeung | MAS | 820 m | MPC · JPL |
| 220245 | 2002 XR_{45} | — | December 10, 2002 | Badlands | Badlands | NYS | 1.5 km | MPC · JPL |
| 220246 | 2002 XZ_{55} | — | December 8, 2002 | Palomar | NEAT | · | 3.6 km | MPC · JPL |
| 220247 | 2002 XK_{64} | — | December 11, 2002 | Socorro | LINEAR | · | 1.9 km | MPC · JPL |
| 220248 | 2002 XU_{67} | — | December 11, 2002 | Socorro | LINEAR | · | 1.6 km | MPC · JPL |
| 220249 | 2002 XD_{75} | — | December 11, 2002 | Socorro | LINEAR | NYS | 1.8 km | MPC · JPL |
| 220250 | 2002 XG_{76} | — | December 11, 2002 | Socorro | LINEAR | · | 1.9 km | MPC · JPL |
| 220251 | 2002 XN_{77} | — | December 11, 2002 | Socorro | LINEAR | V | 890 m | MPC · JPL |
| 220252 | 2002 XO_{82} | — | December 12, 2002 | Palomar | NEAT | · | 1.3 km | MPC · JPL |
| 220253 | 2002 XG_{93} | — | December 5, 2002 | Socorro | LINEAR | MAS | 920 m | MPC · JPL |
| 220254 | 2002 XB_{97} | — | December 5, 2002 | Socorro | LINEAR | NYS | 1.5 km | MPC · JPL |
| 220255 | 2002 XH_{107} | — | December 5, 2002 | Socorro | LINEAR | PHO | 1.6 km | MPC · JPL |
| 220256 | 2002 XK_{118} | — | December 10, 2002 | Palomar | NEAT | NYS | 1.5 km | MPC · JPL |
| 220257 | 2002 XR_{119} | — | December 7, 2002 | Palomar | NEAT | MAS | 1.1 km | MPC · JPL |
| 220258 | 2002 YT_{8} | — | December 31, 2002 | Socorro | LINEAR | NYS | 1.7 km | MPC · JPL |
| 220259 | 2002 YD_{9} | — | December 31, 2002 | Socorro | LINEAR | · | 1.7 km | MPC · JPL |
| 220260 | 2002 YH_{9} | — | December 31, 2002 | Socorro | LINEAR | · | 2.0 km | MPC · JPL |
| 220261 | 2002 YJ_{11} | — | December 31, 2002 | Socorro | LINEAR | · | 2.2 km | MPC · JPL |
| 220262 | 2002 YW_{18} | — | December 31, 2002 | Socorro | LINEAR | NYS | 2.0 km | MPC · JPL |
| 220263 | 2003 AZ_{11} | — | January 1, 2003 | Socorro | LINEAR | · | 2.1 km | MPC · JPL |
| 220264 | 2003 AZ_{19} | — | January 5, 2003 | Socorro | LINEAR | · | 1.7 km | MPC · JPL |
| 220265 | 2003 AK_{28} | — | January 4, 2003 | Socorro | LINEAR | · | 1.7 km | MPC · JPL |
| 220266 | 2003 AN_{28} | — | January 4, 2003 | Socorro | LINEAR | NYS | 1.6 km | MPC · JPL |
| 220267 | 2003 AG_{37} | — | January 7, 2003 | Socorro | LINEAR | · | 2.1 km | MPC · JPL |
| 220268 | 2003 AL_{39} | — | January 7, 2003 | Socorro | LINEAR | · | 2.7 km | MPC · JPL |
| 220269 | 2003 AP_{43} | — | January 5, 2003 | Socorro | LINEAR | NYS | 1.6 km | MPC · JPL |
| 220270 | 2003 AQ_{44} | — | January 5, 2003 | Socorro | LINEAR | · | 1.3 km | MPC · JPL |
| 220271 | 2003 AS_{55} | — | January 5, 2003 | Socorro | LINEAR | NYS | 2.3 km | MPC · JPL |
| 220272 | 2003 AL_{68} | — | January 8, 2003 | Socorro | LINEAR | (6769) | 1.6 km | MPC · JPL |
| 220273 | 2003 AS_{74} | — | January 10, 2003 | Socorro | LINEAR | · | 1.7 km | MPC · JPL |
| 220274 | 2003 AE_{76} | — | January 10, 2003 | Socorro | LINEAR | · | 2.3 km | MPC · JPL |
| 220275 | 2003 AD_{79} | — | January 10, 2003 | Kitt Peak | Spacewatch | NYS | 1.4 km | MPC · JPL |
| 220276 | 2003 AT_{87} | — | January 1, 2003 | Socorro | LINEAR | · | 1.9 km | MPC · JPL |
| 220277 | 2003 BC_{14} | — | January 26, 2003 | Haleakala | NEAT | · | 2.3 km | MPC · JPL |
| 220278 | 2003 BE_{14} | — | January 26, 2003 | Haleakala | NEAT | · | 2.1 km | MPC · JPL |
| 220279 | 2003 BH_{18} | — | January 27, 2003 | Socorro | LINEAR | · | 2.0 km | MPC · JPL |
| 220280 | 2003 BB_{42} | — | January 27, 2003 | Socorro | LINEAR | · | 2.3 km | MPC · JPL |
| 220281 | 2003 BA_{47} | — | January 28, 2003 | Palomar | NEAT | · | 3.4 km | MPC · JPL |
| 220282 | 2003 BP_{48} | — | January 26, 2003 | Anderson Mesa | LONEOS | · | 1.8 km | MPC · JPL |
| 220283 | 2003 BL_{64} | — | January 29, 2003 | Palomar | NEAT | MAS | 1.1 km | MPC · JPL |
| 220284 | 2003 BT_{68} | — | January 28, 2003 | Kitt Peak | Spacewatch | · | 1.4 km | MPC · JPL |
| 220285 | 2003 BS_{69} | — | January 30, 2003 | Anderson Mesa | LONEOS | · | 2.3 km | MPC · JPL |
| 220286 | 2003 BE_{73} | — | January 28, 2003 | Haleakala | NEAT | · | 2.2 km | MPC · JPL |
| 220287 | 2003 BR_{77} | — | January 30, 2003 | Socorro | LINEAR | · | 1.6 km | MPC · JPL |
| 220288 | 2003 BH_{79} | — | January 31, 2003 | Anderson Mesa | LONEOS | · | 3.3 km | MPC · JPL |
| 220289 | 2003 BP_{81} | — | January 31, 2003 | Socorro | LINEAR | · | 1.9 km | MPC · JPL |
| 220290 | 2003 BF_{89} | — | January 28, 2003 | Kitt Peak | Spacewatch | · | 1.4 km | MPC · JPL |
| 220291 | 2003 CW_{3} | — | February 2, 2003 | Anderson Mesa | LONEOS | · | 4.0 km | MPC · JPL |
| 220292 | 2003 CZ_{8} | — | February 2, 2003 | Anderson Mesa | LONEOS | · | 2.1 km | MPC · JPL |
| 220293 | 2003 CA_{10} | — | February 2, 2003 | Socorro | LINEAR | · | 1.8 km | MPC · JPL |
| 220294 | 2003 CV_{15} | — | February 6, 2003 | Palomar | NEAT | · | 2.6 km | MPC · JPL |
| 220295 | 2003 CU_{18} | — | February 6, 2003 | Socorro | LINEAR | · | 3.5 km | MPC · JPL |
| 220296 | 2003 CX_{20} | — | February 13, 2003 | La Silla | Michelsen, R., G. Masi | · | 1.8 km | MPC · JPL |
| 220297 | 2003 CA_{21} | — | February 10, 2003 | Bergisch Gladbach | W. Bickel | · | 2.3 km | MPC · JPL |
| 220298 | 2003 DB_{18} | — | February 19, 2003 | Palomar | NEAT | · | 1.6 km | MPC · JPL |
| 220299 | 2003 EE_{1} | — | March 5, 2003 | Socorro | LINEAR | H | 620 m | MPC · JPL |
| 220300 | 2003 EP_{2} | — | March 5, 2003 | Socorro | LINEAR | · | 1.9 km | MPC · JPL |

== 220301–220400 ==
back to top

| Designation | | | Discovery | | | Properties | | Ref |
| Permanent | Provisional | Named after | Date | Site | Discoverer(s) | Category | Diam. | Ref |
|---|---|---|---|---|---|---|---|---|
| 220301 | 2003 EQ_{5} | — | March 5, 2003 | Socorro | LINEAR | · | 3.6 km | MPC · JPL |
| 220302 | 2003 EX_{11} | — | March 6, 2003 | Socorro | LINEAR | · | 3.5 km | MPC · JPL |
| 220303 | 2003 EC_{13} | — | March 6, 2003 | Socorro | LINEAR | · | 1.3 km | MPC · JPL |
| 220304 | 2003 EQ_{14} | — | March 6, 2003 | Anderson Mesa | LONEOS | · | 1.4 km | MPC · JPL |
| 220305 | 2003 EN_{17} | — | March 5, 2003 | Socorro | LINEAR | H | 730 m | MPC · JPL |
| 220306 | 2003 ET_{26} | — | March 6, 2003 | Anderson Mesa | LONEOS | · | 2.7 km | MPC · JPL |
| 220307 | 2003 EW_{29} | — | March 6, 2003 | Palomar | NEAT | (5) | 1.3 km | MPC · JPL |
| 220308 | 2003 EK_{32} | — | March 7, 2003 | Anderson Mesa | LONEOS | · | 1.5 km | MPC · JPL |
| 220309 | 2003 EZ_{36} | — | March 8, 2003 | Anderson Mesa | LONEOS | H | 1 km | MPC · JPL |
| 220310 | 2003 ER_{38} | — | March 8, 2003 | Anderson Mesa | LONEOS | · | 3.3 km | MPC · JPL |
| 220311 | 2003 EU_{42} | — | March 10, 2003 | Socorro | LINEAR | RAF | 1.8 km | MPC · JPL |
| 220312 | 2003 EX_{42} | — | March 10, 2003 | Kitt Peak | Spacewatch | L4 | 10 km | MPC · JPL |
| 220313 | 2003 EH_{45} | — | March 7, 2003 | Socorro | LINEAR | DOR | 3.7 km | MPC · JPL |
| 220314 | 2003 EC_{47} | — | March 8, 2003 | Anderson Mesa | LONEOS | · | 2.0 km | MPC · JPL |
| 220315 | 2003 EZ_{59} | — | March 14, 2003 | Haleakala | NEAT | H | 870 m | MPC · JPL |
| 220316 | 2003 EL_{60} | — | March 11, 2003 | Campo Imperatore | CINEOS | · | 1.8 km | MPC · JPL |
| 220317 | 2003 EC_{62} | — | March 9, 2003 | Palomar | NEAT | · | 2.3 km | MPC · JPL |
| 220318 | 2003 EG_{63} | — | March 10, 2003 | Anderson Mesa | LONEOS | L4 | 15 km | MPC · JPL |
| 220319 | 2003 FK_{8} | — | March 31, 2003 | Anderson Mesa | LONEOS | H | 800 m | MPC · JPL |
| 220320 | 2003 FU_{10} | — | March 23, 2003 | Kitt Peak | Spacewatch | AGN | 1.5 km | MPC · JPL |
| 220321 | 2003 FR_{12} | — | March 22, 2003 | Kvistaberg | Uppsala-DLR Asteroid Survey | · | 4.3 km | MPC · JPL |
| 220322 | 2003 FN_{25} | — | March 24, 2003 | Kitt Peak | Spacewatch | · | 2.8 km | MPC · JPL |
| 220323 | 2003 FO_{27} | — | March 24, 2003 | Kitt Peak | Spacewatch | · | 1.9 km | MPC · JPL |
| 220324 | 2003 FA_{32} | — | March 23, 2003 | Kitt Peak | Spacewatch | L4 | 10 km | MPC · JPL |
| 220325 | 2003 FV_{40} | — | March 25, 2003 | Palomar | NEAT | · | 1.4 km | MPC · JPL |
| 220326 | 2003 FS_{66} | — | March 26, 2003 | Palomar | NEAT | · | 2.1 km | MPC · JPL |
| 220327 | 2003 FQ_{82} | — | March 27, 2003 | Palomar | NEAT | · | 2.9 km | MPC · JPL |
| 220328 | 2003 FO_{97} | — | March 30, 2003 | Kitt Peak | Spacewatch | · | 2.9 km | MPC · JPL |
| 220329 | 2003 FJ_{110} | — | March 30, 2003 | Kitt Peak | Spacewatch | · | 3.3 km | MPC · JPL |
| 220330 | 2003 FZ_{119} | — | March 23, 2003 | Goodricke-Pigott | R. A. Tucker | TIR | 3.6 km | MPC · JPL |
| 220331 Stevenarnold | 2003 FG_{124} | Stevenarnold | March 30, 2003 | Kitt Peak | M. W. Buie | · | 2.3 km | MPC · JPL |
| 220332 | 2003 FR_{130} | — | March 26, 2003 | Haleakala | NEAT | EUN | 1.6 km | MPC · JPL |
| 220333 | 2003 FM_{133} | — | March 27, 2003 | Kitt Peak | Spacewatch | L4 | 8.9 km | MPC · JPL |
| 220334 | 2003 GV_{3} | — | April 1, 2003 | Socorro | LINEAR | · | 2.9 km | MPC · JPL |
| 220335 | 2003 GD_{8} | — | April 3, 2003 | Anderson Mesa | LONEOS | L4 | 10 km | MPC · JPL |
| 220336 | 2003 GM_{8} | — | April 3, 2003 | Anderson Mesa | LONEOS | L4 | 9.7 km | MPC · JPL |
| 220337 | 2003 GY_{11} | — | April 1, 2003 | Kitt Peak | Spacewatch | · | 1.3 km | MPC · JPL |
| 220338 | 2003 GD_{14} | — | April 1, 2003 | Socorro | LINEAR | EUN | 2.3 km | MPC · JPL |
| 220339 | 2003 GX_{16} | — | April 4, 2003 | Socorro | LINEAR | · | 3.5 km | MPC · JPL |
| 220340 | 2003 GA_{18} | — | April 4, 2003 | Kitt Peak | Spacewatch | · | 2.1 km | MPC · JPL |
| 220341 | 2003 GY_{20} | — | April 5, 2003 | Reedy Creek | J. Broughton | · | 2.8 km | MPC · JPL |
| 220342 | 2003 GP_{27} | — | April 7, 2003 | Kitt Peak | Spacewatch | L4 | 10 km | MPC · JPL |
| 220343 | 2003 GZ_{34} | — | April 8, 2003 | Socorro | LINEAR | HNS | 1.9 km | MPC · JPL |
| 220344 | 2003 GK_{41} | — | April 9, 2003 | Palomar | NEAT | · | 2.9 km | MPC · JPL |
| 220345 | 2003 GG_{44} | — | April 9, 2003 | Socorro | LINEAR | · | 4.2 km | MPC · JPL |
| 220346 Nedabehrooz | 2003 GR_{51} | Nedabehrooz | April 1, 2003 | Kitt Peak | M. W. Buie | PAD | 2.6 km | MPC · JPL |
| 220347 | 2003 GH_{54} | — | April 11, 2003 | Anderson Mesa | LONEOS | · | 3.3 km | MPC · JPL |
| 220348 | 2003 HB_{5} | — | April 24, 2003 | Anderson Mesa | LONEOS | · | 2.3 km | MPC · JPL |
| 220349 | 2003 HK_{11} | — | April 26, 2003 | Kitt Peak | Spacewatch | · | 2.3 km | MPC · JPL |
| 220350 | 2003 HN_{13} | — | April 24, 2003 | Kitt Peak | Spacewatch | KOR | 1.7 km | MPC · JPL |
| 220351 | 2003 HK_{22} | — | April 24, 2003 | Kitt Peak | Spacewatch | L4 | 16 km | MPC · JPL |
| 220352 | 2003 HQ_{23} | — | April 25, 2003 | Kitt Peak | Spacewatch | · | 1.7 km | MPC · JPL |
| 220353 | 2003 HH_{55} | — | April 25, 2003 | Campo Imperatore | CINEOS | · | 3.9 km | MPC · JPL |
| 220354 | 2003 JP_{1} | — | May 1, 2003 | Socorro | LINEAR | · | 3.4 km | MPC · JPL |
| 220355 | 2003 JG_{11} | — | May 3, 2003 | Kitt Peak | Spacewatch | L4 | 10 km | MPC · JPL |
| 220356 | 2003 JJ_{15} | — | May 6, 2003 | Kitt Peak | Spacewatch | L4 | 15 km | MPC · JPL |
| 220357 | 2003 MP_{4} | — | June 26, 2003 | Socorro | LINEAR | · | 3.8 km | MPC · JPL |
| 220358 | 2003 MR_{4} | — | June 26, 2003 | Socorro | LINEAR | · | 4.8 km | MPC · JPL |
| 220359 | 2003 NN_{1} | — | July 1, 2003 | Socorro | LINEAR | · | 5.3 km | MPC · JPL |
| 220360 | 2003 NV_{2} | — | July 1, 2003 | Haleakala | NEAT | TIR | 5.0 km | MPC · JPL |
| 220361 | 2003 NL_{5} | — | July 6, 2003 | Mount Graham | Ryan, W. H., Martinez, C. T. | · | 2.0 km | MPC · JPL |
| 220362 | 2003 NK_{6} | — | July 7, 2003 | Socorro | LINEAR | EUP | 5.1 km | MPC · JPL |
| 220363 | 2003 NN_{6} | — | July 8, 2003 | Kitt Peak | Spacewatch | · | 2.9 km | MPC · JPL |
| 220364 | 2003 NT_{12} | — | July 5, 2003 | Kitt Peak | Spacewatch | · | 4.2 km | MPC · JPL |
| 220365 | 2003 NX_{12} | — | July 4, 2003 | Kitt Peak | Spacewatch | THB | 3.6 km | MPC · JPL |
| 220366 | 2003 OO_{4} | — | July 22, 2003 | Haleakala | NEAT | · | 5.2 km | MPC · JPL |
| 220367 | 2003 OO_{8} | — | July 26, 2003 | Reedy Creek | J. Broughton | · | 4.8 km | MPC · JPL |
| 220368 | 2003 OV_{8} | — | July 23, 2003 | Palomar | NEAT | · | 4.0 km | MPC · JPL |
| 220369 | 2003 OZ_{9} | — | July 25, 2003 | Palomar | NEAT | · | 4.4 km | MPC · JPL |
| 220370 | 2003 OO_{12} | — | July 27, 2003 | Socorro | LINEAR | · | 7.2 km | MPC · JPL |
| 220371 | 2003 OR_{12} | — | July 28, 2003 | Palomar | NEAT | · | 3.3 km | MPC · JPL |
| 220372 | 2003 ON_{14} | — | July 22, 2003 | Palomar | NEAT | · | 6.4 km | MPC · JPL |
| 220373 | 2003 OB_{15} | — | July 22, 2003 | Palomar | NEAT | · | 5.6 km | MPC · JPL |
| 220374 | 2003 OV_{24} | — | July 24, 2003 | Palomar | NEAT | · | 3.6 km | MPC · JPL |
| 220375 | 2003 OO_{26} | — | July 24, 2003 | Palomar | NEAT | EOS | 2.7 km | MPC · JPL |
| 220376 | 2003 OX_{32} | — | July 23, 2003 | Palomar | NEAT | · | 4.0 km | MPC · JPL |
| 220377 | 2003 PV | — | August 1, 2003 | Socorro | LINEAR | · | 4.9 km | MPC · JPL |
| 220378 | 2003 QQ | — | August 18, 2003 | Campo Imperatore | CINEOS | · | 5.4 km | MPC · JPL |
| 220379 | 2003 QF_{4} | — | August 18, 2003 | Campo Imperatore | CINEOS | · | 5.3 km | MPC · JPL |
| 220380 | 2003 QO_{22} | — | August 20, 2003 | Palomar | NEAT | · | 3.7 km | MPC · JPL |
| 220381 | 2003 QF_{23} | — | August 20, 2003 | Palomar | NEAT | · | 6.9 km | MPC · JPL |
| 220382 | 2003 QD_{30} | — | August 20, 2003 | Reedy Creek | J. Broughton | LUT | 6.9 km | MPC · JPL |
| 220383 | 2003 QO_{42} | — | August 22, 2003 | Palomar | NEAT | (1118) | 6.2 km | MPC · JPL |
| 220384 | 2003 QN_{44} | — | August 23, 2003 | Socorro | LINEAR | · | 5.9 km | MPC · JPL |
| 220385 | 2003 QU_{45} | — | August 23, 2003 | Socorro | LINEAR | · | 6.1 km | MPC · JPL |
| 220386 | 2003 QK_{46} | — | August 23, 2003 | Socorro | LINEAR | · | 3.9 km | MPC · JPL |
| 220387 | 2003 QN_{48} | — | August 20, 2003 | Campo Imperatore | CINEOS | THM | 3.3 km | MPC · JPL |
| 220388 | 2003 QK_{51} | — | August 22, 2003 | Palomar | NEAT | · | 5.8 km | MPC · JPL |
| 220389 | 2003 QE_{68} | — | August 25, 2003 | Socorro | LINEAR | · | 5.6 km | MPC · JPL |
| 220390 | 2003 QE_{69} | — | August 23, 2003 | Palomar | NEAT | · | 6.3 km | MPC · JPL |
| 220391 | 2003 QM_{72} | — | August 23, 2003 | Palomar | NEAT | · | 6.4 km | MPC · JPL |
| 220392 | 2003 QN_{73} | — | August 24, 2003 | Socorro | LINEAR | · | 5.2 km | MPC · JPL |
| 220393 | 2003 QN_{88} | — | August 25, 2003 | Socorro | LINEAR | H | 790 m | MPC · JPL |
| 220394 | 2003 QR_{98} | — | August 30, 2003 | Kitt Peak | Spacewatch | · | 3.8 km | MPC · JPL |
| 220395 | 2003 QJ_{109} | — | August 31, 2003 | Socorro | LINEAR | · | 4.8 km | MPC · JPL |
| 220396 | 2003 RR_{4} | — | September 3, 2003 | Socorro | LINEAR | · | 6.6 km | MPC · JPL |
| 220397 | 2003 RK_{10} | — | September 12, 2003 | Wrightwood | J. W. Young | THM | 3.4 km | MPC · JPL |
| 220398 | 2003 RC_{11} | — | September 13, 2003 | Anderson Mesa | LONEOS | · | 3.0 km | MPC · JPL |
| 220399 | 2003 RA_{16} | — | September 15, 2003 | Palomar | NEAT | · | 6.5 km | MPC · JPL |
| 220400 | 2003 RF_{20} | — | September 15, 2003 | Anderson Mesa | LONEOS | · | 3.0 km | MPC · JPL |

== 220401–220500 ==
back to top

| Designation | | | Discovery | | | Properties | | Ref |
| Permanent | Provisional | Named after | Date | Site | Discoverer(s) | Category | Diam. | Ref |
|---|---|---|---|---|---|---|---|---|
| 220401 | 2003 SM_{23} | — | September 16, 2003 | Haleakala | NEAT | · | 7.9 km | MPC · JPL |
| 220402 | 2003 SJ_{38} | — | September 16, 2003 | Palomar | NEAT | CYB | 6.7 km | MPC · JPL |
| 220403 | 2003 SH_{48} | — | September 18, 2003 | Kitt Peak | Spacewatch | (1298) | 5.9 km | MPC · JPL |
| 220404 | 2003 SP_{55} | — | September 16, 2003 | Anderson Mesa | LONEOS | · | 5.9 km | MPC · JPL |
| 220405 | 2003 SY_{55} | — | September 16, 2003 | Anderson Mesa | LONEOS | · | 5.6 km | MPC · JPL |
| 220406 | 2003 SG_{56} | — | September 16, 2003 | Anderson Mesa | LONEOS | · | 6.0 km | MPC · JPL |
| 220407 | 2003 SP_{58} | — | September 17, 2003 | Anderson Mesa | LONEOS | · | 4.9 km | MPC · JPL |
| 220408 | 2003 SG_{66} | — | September 18, 2003 | Socorro | LINEAR | HYG | 5.2 km | MPC · JPL |
| 220409 | 2003 SQ_{76} | — | September 18, 2003 | Kitt Peak | Spacewatch | · | 4.2 km | MPC · JPL |
| 220410 | 2003 SM_{89} | — | September 18, 2003 | Palomar | NEAT | · | 7.2 km | MPC · JPL |
| 220411 | 2003 SN_{122} | — | September 18, 2003 | Anderson Mesa | LONEOS | · | 3.7 km | MPC · JPL |
| 220412 | 2003 SL_{128} | — | September 20, 2003 | Haleakala | NEAT | CYB | 5.7 km | MPC · JPL |
| 220413 | 2003 SD_{193} | — | September 20, 2003 | Palomar | NEAT | · | 3.5 km | MPC · JPL |
| 220414 | 2003 SK_{193} | — | September 20, 2003 | Socorro | LINEAR | · | 4.1 km | MPC · JPL |
| 220415 | 2003 SW_{195} | — | September 20, 2003 | Kitt Peak | Spacewatch | · | 4.2 km | MPC · JPL |
| 220416 | 2003 SM_{196} | — | September 20, 2003 | Palomar | NEAT | · | 4.1 km | MPC · JPL |
| 220417 | 2003 SS_{197} | — | September 21, 2003 | Anderson Mesa | LONEOS | · | 6.9 km | MPC · JPL |
| 220418 Golovyno | 2003 SL_{221} | Golovyno | September 23, 2003 | Andrushivka | Andrushivka | · | 4.5 km | MPC · JPL |
| 220419 | 2003 SL_{230} | — | September 24, 2003 | Palomar | NEAT | THM | 4.4 km | MPC · JPL |
| 220420 | 2003 SH_{231} | — | September 24, 2003 | Palomar | NEAT | (159) | 3.7 km | MPC · JPL |
| 220421 | 2003 SU_{246} | — | September 26, 2003 | Socorro | LINEAR | · | 5.0 km | MPC · JPL |
| 220422 | 2003 SQ_{257} | — | September 28, 2003 | Socorro | LINEAR | · | 4.5 km | MPC · JPL |
| 220423 | 2003 SM_{284} | — | September 20, 2003 | Socorro | LINEAR | · | 5.6 km | MPC · JPL |
| 220424 | 2003 SE_{295} | — | September 29, 2003 | Anderson Mesa | LONEOS | · | 4.8 km | MPC · JPL |
| 220425 | 2003 SL_{304} | — | September 17, 2003 | Palomar | NEAT | CYB | 6.3 km | MPC · JPL |
| 220426 | 2003 SD_{329} | — | September 22, 2003 | Anderson Mesa | LONEOS | · | 5.1 km | MPC · JPL |
| 220427 | 2003 TN_{46} | — | October 3, 2003 | Kitt Peak | Spacewatch | · | 4.8 km | MPC · JPL |
| 220428 | 2003 UJ_{3} | — | October 17, 2003 | Kitt Peak | Spacewatch | · | 1.0 km | MPC · JPL |
| 220429 | 2003 UD_{28} | — | October 17, 2003 | Kitt Peak | Spacewatch | · | 4.8 km | MPC · JPL |
| 220430 | 2003 UK_{28} | — | October 18, 2003 | Kitt Peak | Spacewatch | · | 5.1 km | MPC · JPL |
| 220431 | 2003 UH_{51} | — | October 18, 2003 | Palomar | NEAT | · | 5.2 km | MPC · JPL |
| 220432 | 2003 UL_{61} | — | October 16, 2003 | Anderson Mesa | LONEOS | EUP | 6.0 km | MPC · JPL |
| 220433 | 2003 UC_{183} | — | October 21, 2003 | Palomar | NEAT | CYB | 5.1 km | MPC · JPL |
| 220434 | 2003 UX_{211} | — | October 23, 2003 | Kitt Peak | Spacewatch | THM | 5.0 km | MPC · JPL |
| 220435 | 2003 UX_{263} | — | October 27, 2003 | Anderson Mesa | LONEOS | CYB | 7.4 km | MPC · JPL |
| 220436 | 2003 UO_{283} | — | October 30, 2003 | Socorro | LINEAR | · | 1.4 km | MPC · JPL |
| 220437 | 2003 UD_{294} | — | October 16, 2003 | Kitt Peak | Spacewatch | EOS | 3.3 km | MPC · JPL |
| 220438 | 2003 WD_{7} | — | November 18, 2003 | Socorro | LINEAR | EUP | 6.7 km | MPC · JPL |
| 220439 | 2003 WL_{31} | — | November 18, 2003 | Palomar | NEAT | · | 5.6 km | MPC · JPL |
| 220440 | 2003 WH_{41} | — | November 19, 2003 | Kitt Peak | Spacewatch | · | 1.2 km | MPC · JPL |
| 220441 | 2003 WC_{84} | — | November 21, 2003 | Socorro | LINEAR | EUP | 5.6 km | MPC · JPL |
| 220442 | 2003 WQ_{91} | — | November 18, 2003 | Kitt Peak | Spacewatch | · | 5.0 km | MPC · JPL |
| 220443 | 2003 WV_{145} | — | November 21, 2003 | Socorro | LINEAR | · | 4.2 km | MPC · JPL |
| 220444 Pontusbrandt | 2003 WL_{183} | Pontusbrandt | November 23, 2003 | Kitt Peak | M. W. Buie | · | 2.3 km | MPC · JPL |
| 220445 | 2003 WR_{194} | — | November 24, 2003 | Anderson Mesa | LONEOS | · | 940 m | MPC · JPL |
| 220446 | 2003 YX_{29} | — | December 17, 2003 | Palomar | NEAT | · | 1.1 km | MPC · JPL |
| 220447 | 2003 YG_{40} | — | December 19, 2003 | Kitt Peak | Spacewatch | · | 950 m | MPC · JPL |
| 220448 | 2003 YF_{65} | — | December 19, 2003 | Socorro | LINEAR | · | 1.5 km | MPC · JPL |
| 220449 | 2003 YN_{109} | — | December 22, 2003 | Kitt Peak | Spacewatch | PHO | 3.7 km | MPC · JPL |
| 220450 | 2003 YW_{111} | — | December 23, 2003 | Socorro | LINEAR | EOS | 3.7 km | MPC · JPL |
| 220451 | 2003 YY_{111} | — | December 23, 2003 | Socorro | LINEAR | · | 1.2 km | MPC · JPL |
| 220452 | 2003 YN_{117} | — | December 27, 2003 | Socorro | LINEAR | · | 1.1 km | MPC · JPL |
| 220453 | 2003 YS_{120} | — | December 27, 2003 | Socorro | LINEAR | · | 1.2 km | MPC · JPL |
| 220454 | 2003 YD_{131} | — | December 28, 2003 | Socorro | LINEAR | · | 1.0 km | MPC · JPL |
| 220455 | 2003 YQ_{163} | — | December 17, 2003 | Kitt Peak | Spacewatch | · | 1.1 km | MPC · JPL |
| 220456 | 2004 AJ_{5} | — | January 13, 2004 | Anderson Mesa | LONEOS | · | 1.1 km | MPC · JPL |
| 220457 | 2004 BY_{10} | — | January 17, 2004 | Haleakala | NEAT | · | 1.2 km | MPC · JPL |
| 220458 | 2004 BJ_{20} | — | January 16, 2004 | Palomar | NEAT | · | 2.2 km | MPC · JPL |
| 220459 | 2004 BA_{25} | — | January 19, 2004 | Kitt Peak | Spacewatch | · | 1.0 km | MPC · JPL |
| 220460 | 2004 BE_{30} | — | January 18, 2004 | Palomar | NEAT | · | 1.3 km | MPC · JPL |
| 220461 | 2004 BD_{36} | — | January 19, 2004 | Kitt Peak | Spacewatch | 3:2 | 7.3 km | MPC · JPL |
| 220462 | 2004 BP_{36} | — | January 19, 2004 | Kitt Peak | Spacewatch | · | 1.4 km | MPC · JPL |
| 220463 | 2004 BA_{40} | — | January 21, 2004 | Socorro | LINEAR | · | 1.3 km | MPC · JPL |
| 220464 | 2004 BE_{40} | — | January 21, 2004 | Socorro | LINEAR | · | 840 m | MPC · JPL |
| 220465 | 2004 BF_{52} | — | January 21, 2004 | Socorro | LINEAR | NYS | 1.5 km | MPC · JPL |
| 220466 | 2004 BB_{58} | — | January 23, 2004 | Anderson Mesa | LONEOS | · | 1.8 km | MPC · JPL |
| 220467 | 2004 BN_{67} | — | January 24, 2004 | Socorro | LINEAR | · | 1.2 km | MPC · JPL |
| 220468 | 2004 BB_{71} | — | January 22, 2004 | Socorro | LINEAR | · | 1.1 km | MPC · JPL |
| 220469 | 2004 BU_{78} | — | January 22, 2004 | Socorro | LINEAR | · | 860 m | MPC · JPL |
| 220470 | 2004 BV_{97} | — | January 27, 2004 | Kitt Peak | Spacewatch | · | 1.7 km | MPC · JPL |
| 220471 | 2004 BL_{102} | — | January 29, 2004 | Kitt Peak | Spacewatch | · | 1.6 km | MPC · JPL |
| 220472 | 2004 BM_{103} | — | January 18, 2004 | Haleakala | NEAT | · | 1.8 km | MPC · JPL |
| 220473 | 2004 BN_{110} | — | January 28, 2004 | Catalina | CSS | · | 1.9 km | MPC · JPL |
| 220474 | 2004 BL_{140} | — | January 19, 2004 | Kitt Peak | Spacewatch | · | 740 m | MPC · JPL |
| 220475 | 2004 BD_{143} | — | January 19, 2004 | Kitt Peak | Spacewatch | NYS | 1.0 km | MPC · JPL |
| 220476 | 2004 CF_{4} | — | February 10, 2004 | Palomar | NEAT | V | 990 m | MPC · JPL |
| 220477 | 2004 CS_{14} | — | February 11, 2004 | Palomar | NEAT | V | 1.1 km | MPC · JPL |
| 220478 | 2004 CR_{15} | — | February 11, 2004 | Kitt Peak | Spacewatch | · | 1.4 km | MPC · JPL |
| 220479 | 2004 CR_{17} | — | February 12, 2004 | Kitt Peak | Spacewatch | V | 740 m | MPC · JPL |
| 220480 | 2004 CX_{17} | — | February 10, 2004 | Palomar | NEAT | · | 1 km | MPC · JPL |
| 220481 | 2004 CE_{29} | — | February 12, 2004 | Kitt Peak | Spacewatch | · | 1.7 km | MPC · JPL |
| 220482 | 2004 CV_{35} | — | February 11, 2004 | Palomar | NEAT | · | 1.2 km | MPC · JPL |
| 220483 | 2004 CX_{35} | — | February 11, 2004 | Palomar | NEAT | ERI | 2.0 km | MPC · JPL |
| 220484 | 2004 CH_{55} | — | February 12, 2004 | Kitt Peak | Spacewatch | · | 1.5 km | MPC · JPL |
| 220485 | 2004 CF_{63} | — | February 12, 2004 | Palomar | NEAT | · | 1.3 km | MPC · JPL |
| 220486 | 2004 CN_{77} | — | February 11, 2004 | Palomar | NEAT | NYS | 1.3 km | MPC · JPL |
| 220487 | 2004 CT_{77} | — | February 11, 2004 | Palomar | NEAT | · | 790 m | MPC · JPL |
| 220488 | 2004 CX_{81} | — | February 12, 2004 | Kitt Peak | Spacewatch | · | 1.5 km | MPC · JPL |
| 220489 | 2004 CJ_{84} | — | February 13, 2004 | Kitt Peak | Spacewatch | MAS | 890 m | MPC · JPL |
| 220490 | 2004 CR_{91} | — | February 13, 2004 | Palomar | NEAT | V | 1.1 km | MPC · JPL |
| 220491 | 2004 CY_{120} | — | February 12, 2004 | Kitt Peak | Spacewatch | · | 1.4 km | MPC · JPL |
| 220492 | 2004 CJ_{123} | — | February 12, 2004 | Kitt Peak | Spacewatch | · | 1.5 km | MPC · JPL |
| 220493 | 2004 CD_{129} | — | February 14, 2004 | Kitt Peak | Spacewatch | · | 2.0 km | MPC · JPL |
| 220494 | 2004 DK | — | February 16, 2004 | Desert Eagle | W. K. Y. Yeung | · | 1.5 km | MPC · JPL |
| 220495 Margarethe | 2004 DO | Margarethe | February 17, 2004 | Wildberg | R. Apitzsch | PHO | 1.7 km | MPC · JPL |
| 220496 | 2004 DB_{1} | — | February 16, 2004 | Kvistaberg | Uppsala-DLR Asteroid Survey | · | 1.7 km | MPC · JPL |
| 220497 | 2004 DD_{1} | — | February 16, 2004 | Socorro | LINEAR | · | 1.2 km | MPC · JPL |
| 220498 | 2004 DG_{5} | — | February 18, 2004 | Haleakala | NEAT | · | 1.9 km | MPC · JPL |
| 220499 | 2004 DD_{10} | — | February 16, 2004 | Desert Eagle | W. K. Y. Yeung | · | 1.7 km | MPC · JPL |
| 220500 | 2004 DM_{11} | — | February 16, 2004 | Kitt Peak | Spacewatch | · | 2.1 km | MPC · JPL |

== 220501–220600 ==
back to top

| Designation | | | Discovery | | | Properties | | Ref |
| Permanent | Provisional | Named after | Date | Site | Discoverer(s) | Category | Diam. | Ref |
|---|---|---|---|---|---|---|---|---|
| 220501 | 2004 DB_{18} | — | February 18, 2004 | Socorro | LINEAR | · | 1.2 km | MPC · JPL |
| 220502 | 2004 DG_{21} | — | February 17, 2004 | Catalina | CSS | · | 1.5 km | MPC · JPL |
| 220503 | 2004 DP_{21} | — | February 17, 2004 | Catalina | CSS | · | 1.8 km | MPC · JPL |
| 220504 | 2004 DP_{31} | — | February 17, 2004 | Kitt Peak | Spacewatch | · | 1.3 km | MPC · JPL |
| 220505 | 2004 DL_{33} | — | February 18, 2004 | Socorro | LINEAR | · | 1.9 km | MPC · JPL |
| 220506 | 2004 DE_{35} | — | February 19, 2004 | Socorro | LINEAR | · | 1.7 km | MPC · JPL |
| 220507 | 2004 DH_{44} | — | February 25, 2004 | Desert Eagle | W. K. Y. Yeung | · | 1.2 km | MPC · JPL |
| 220508 | 2004 DH_{47} | — | February 19, 2004 | Socorro | LINEAR | V | 940 m | MPC · JPL |
| 220509 | 2004 DA_{60} | — | February 26, 2004 | Socorro | LINEAR | · | 930 m | MPC · JPL |
| 220510 | 2004 EQ_{7} | — | March 12, 2004 | Palomar | NEAT | MAS | 1.0 km | MPC · JPL |
| 220511 | 2004 ET_{9} | — | March 15, 2004 | Palomar | NEAT | PHO | 2.0 km | MPC · JPL |
| 220512 | 2004 EH_{17} | — | March 12, 2004 | Palomar | NEAT | · | 2.1 km | MPC · JPL |
| 220513 | 2004 EW_{19} | — | March 14, 2004 | Kitt Peak | Spacewatch | · | 1.7 km | MPC · JPL |
| 220514 | 2004 EF_{21} | — | March 15, 2004 | Kitt Peak | Spacewatch | · | 1.5 km | MPC · JPL |
| 220515 | 2004 EZ_{21} | — | March 15, 2004 | Desert Eagle | W. K. Y. Yeung | · | 1.8 km | MPC · JPL |
| 220516 | 2004 ES_{29} | — | March 15, 2004 | Kitt Peak | Spacewatch | MAS | 890 m | MPC · JPL |
| 220517 | 2004 ER_{34} | — | March 12, 2004 | Palomar | NEAT | NYS | 1.7 km | MPC · JPL |
| 220518 | 2004 EP_{43} | — | March 15, 2004 | Palomar | NEAT | · | 1.5 km | MPC · JPL |
| 220519 | 2004 EG_{54} | — | March 11, 2004 | Palomar | NEAT | · | 1.9 km | MPC · JPL |
| 220520 | 2004 EW_{62} | — | March 13, 2004 | Palomar | NEAT | · | 1.6 km | MPC · JPL |
| 220521 | 2004 EF_{70} | — | March 15, 2004 | Kitt Peak | Spacewatch | NYS | 1.6 km | MPC · JPL |
| 220522 | 2004 EQ_{70} | — | March 15, 2004 | Kitt Peak | Spacewatch | · | 1.6 km | MPC · JPL |
| 220523 | 2004 EP_{73} | — | March 15, 2004 | Catalina | CSS | · | 1.3 km | MPC · JPL |
| 220524 | 2004 EH_{78} | — | March 15, 2004 | Catalina | CSS | · | 1.8 km | MPC · JPL |
| 220525 | 2004 ET_{83} | — | March 14, 2004 | Kitt Peak | Spacewatch | · | 1.6 km | MPC · JPL |
| 220526 | 2004 EA_{86} | — | March 15, 2004 | Socorro | LINEAR | · | 3.2 km | MPC · JPL |
| 220527 | 2004 EO_{96} | — | March 11, 2004 | Palomar | NEAT | · | 1.6 km | MPC · JPL |
| 220528 | 2004 EC_{115} | — | March 14, 2004 | Kitt Peak | Spacewatch | · | 1.1 km | MPC · JPL |
| 220529 | 2004 FG_{18} | — | March 28, 2004 | Desert Eagle | W. K. Y. Yeung | NYS | 1.4 km | MPC · JPL |
| 220530 | 2004 FT_{18} | — | March 26, 2004 | Kitt Peak | Deep Lens Survey | L4 | 10 km | MPC · JPL |
| 220531 | 2004 FS_{23} | — | March 17, 2004 | Kitt Peak | Spacewatch | NYS | 1.5 km | MPC · JPL |
| 220532 | 2004 FK_{25} | — | March 17, 2004 | Socorro | LINEAR | · | 1.2 km | MPC · JPL |
| 220533 | 2004 FC_{31} | — | March 29, 2004 | Socorro | LINEAR | PHO | 3.9 km | MPC · JPL |
| 220534 | 2004 FC_{34} | — | March 16, 2004 | Socorro | LINEAR | · | 2.0 km | MPC · JPL |
| 220535 | 2004 FJ_{36} | — | March 16, 2004 | Socorro | LINEAR | V | 1.3 km | MPC · JPL |
| 220536 | 2004 FC_{41} | — | March 18, 2004 | Socorro | LINEAR | MAS | 950 m | MPC · JPL |
| 220537 | 2004 FA_{48} | — | March 18, 2004 | Socorro | LINEAR | · | 1.7 km | MPC · JPL |
| 220538 | 2004 FE_{55} | — | March 19, 2004 | Kitt Peak | Spacewatch | · | 1.4 km | MPC · JPL |
| 220539 | 2004 FO_{75} | — | March 17, 2004 | Kitt Peak | Spacewatch | · | 1.2 km | MPC · JPL |
| 220540 | 2004 FQ_{80} | — | March 22, 2004 | Socorro | LINEAR | NYS | 1.7 km | MPC · JPL |
| 220541 | 2004 FX_{110} | — | March 25, 2004 | Anderson Mesa | LONEOS | MAS | 1.0 km | MPC · JPL |
| 220542 | 2004 FL_{118} | — | March 22, 2004 | Socorro | LINEAR | · | 1.7 km | MPC · JPL |
| 220543 | 2004 FF_{124} | — | March 27, 2004 | Kitt Peak | Spacewatch | MAS | 790 m | MPC · JPL |
| 220544 | 2004 FB_{135} | — | March 27, 2004 | Kitt Peak | Spacewatch | · | 1.1 km | MPC · JPL |
| 220545 | 2004 FE_{142} | — | March 27, 2004 | Socorro | LINEAR | NYS | 1.6 km | MPC · JPL |
| 220546 | 2004 FE_{148} | — | March 18, 2004 | Socorro | LINEAR | · | 2.0 km | MPC · JPL |
| 220547 | 2004 FP_{158} | — | March 18, 2004 | Kitt Peak | Spacewatch | · | 1.9 km | MPC · JPL |
| 220548 | 2004 GW_{5} | — | April 12, 2004 | Palomar | NEAT | V | 1.1 km | MPC · JPL |
| 220549 | 2004 GH_{8} | — | April 12, 2004 | Palomar | NEAT | · | 1.7 km | MPC · JPL |
| 220550 | 2004 GP_{14} | — | April 13, 2004 | Palomar | NEAT | · | 2.6 km | MPC · JPL |
| 220551 | 2004 GX_{20} | — | April 11, 2004 | Palomar | NEAT | V | 1.0 km | MPC · JPL |
| 220552 | 2004 GD_{38} | — | April 14, 2004 | Palomar | NEAT | JUN | 1.6 km | MPC · JPL |
| 220553 | 2004 GM_{39} | — | April 15, 2004 | Anderson Mesa | LONEOS | NYS | 2.0 km | MPC · JPL |
| 220554 | 2004 GW_{59} | — | April 13, 2004 | Kitt Peak | Spacewatch | JUN | 1.2 km | MPC · JPL |
| 220555 | 2004 GG_{82} | — | April 13, 2004 | Palomar | NEAT | L4 | 10 km | MPC · JPL |
| 220556 | 2004 HN_{3} | — | April 16, 2004 | Palomar | NEAT | · | 2.2 km | MPC · JPL |
| 220557 | 2004 HZ_{4} | — | April 16, 2004 | Palomar | NEAT | · | 1.5 km | MPC · JPL |
| 220558 | 2004 HE_{5} | — | April 16, 2004 | Palomar | NEAT | · | 1.6 km | MPC · JPL |
| 220559 | 2004 HB_{10} | — | April 17, 2004 | Socorro | LINEAR | · | 1.9 km | MPC · JPL |
| 220560 | 2004 HV_{10} | — | April 17, 2004 | Anderson Mesa | LONEOS | · | 3.1 km | MPC · JPL |
| 220561 | 2004 HN_{17} | — | April 17, 2004 | Socorro | LINEAR | · | 1.5 km | MPC · JPL |
| 220562 | 2004 HM_{18} | — | April 17, 2004 | Palomar | NEAT | · | 2.2 km | MPC · JPL |
| 220563 | 2004 HT_{19} | — | April 20, 2004 | Kitt Peak | Spacewatch | · | 1.9 km | MPC · JPL |
| 220564 | 2004 HX_{19} | — | April 20, 2004 | Catalina | CSS | · | 1.7 km | MPC · JPL |
| 220565 | 2004 HD_{22} | — | April 16, 2004 | Kitt Peak | Spacewatch | NYS | 1.2 km | MPC · JPL |
| 220566 | 2004 HQ_{26} | — | April 20, 2004 | Socorro | LINEAR | · | 990 m | MPC · JPL |
| 220567 | 2004 HJ_{37} | — | April 21, 2004 | Catalina | CSS | · | 2.3 km | MPC · JPL |
| 220568 | 2004 HT_{42} | — | April 20, 2004 | Socorro | LINEAR | · | 2.9 km | MPC · JPL |
| 220569 | 2004 HP_{47} | — | April 22, 2004 | Catalina | CSS | MAR | 1.7 km | MPC · JPL |
| 220570 | 2004 HB_{52} | — | April 24, 2004 | Kitt Peak | Spacewatch | L4 | 10 km | MPC · JPL |
| 220571 | 2004 HE_{53} | — | April 25, 2004 | Socorro | LINEAR | JUN | 1.4 km | MPC · JPL |
| 220572 | 2004 HZ_{54} | — | April 21, 2004 | Campo Imperatore | CINEOS | · | 1.9 km | MPC · JPL |
| 220573 | 2004 HF_{57} | — | April 21, 2004 | Kitt Peak | Spacewatch | · | 1.3 km | MPC · JPL |
| 220574 | 2004 HR_{57} | — | April 21, 2004 | Kitt Peak | Spacewatch | L4 | 10 km | MPC · JPL |
| 220575 | 2004 HF_{62} | — | April 23, 2004 | Reedy Creek | J. Broughton | MAR | 1.7 km | MPC · JPL |
| 220576 | 2004 HK_{62} | — | April 24, 2004 | Socorro | LINEAR | · | 3.1 km | MPC · JPL |
| 220577 | 2004 HS_{67} | — | April 20, 2004 | Kitt Peak | Spacewatch | · | 1.4 km | MPC · JPL |
| 220578 | 2004 JG | — | May 8, 2004 | Wrightwood | J. W. Young | PHO | 1.6 km | MPC · JPL |
| 220579 | 2004 JX_{5} | — | May 12, 2004 | Socorro | LINEAR | BRU | 3.2 km | MPC · JPL |
| 220580 | 2004 JU_{7} | — | May 10, 2004 | Kitt Peak | Spacewatch | · | 1.4 km | MPC · JPL |
| 220581 | 2004 JV_{10} | — | May 12, 2004 | Catalina | CSS | · | 1.8 km | MPC · JPL |
| 220582 | 2004 JU_{22} | — | May 10, 2004 | Palomar | NEAT | · | 1.5 km | MPC · JPL |
| 220583 | 2004 JF_{23} | — | May 13, 2004 | Kitt Peak | Spacewatch | · | 1.9 km | MPC · JPL |
| 220584 | 2004 JF_{28} | — | May 15, 2004 | Socorro | LINEAR | EUN | 2.3 km | MPC · JPL |
| 220585 | 2004 JG_{28} | — | May 15, 2004 | Socorro | LINEAR | · | 1.4 km | MPC · JPL |
| 220586 | 2004 JL_{36} | — | May 9, 2004 | Kitt Peak | Spacewatch | · | 2.1 km | MPC · JPL |
| 220587 | 2004 JB_{39} | — | May 14, 2004 | Socorro | LINEAR | · | 2.3 km | MPC · JPL |
| 220588 | 2004 KM_{10} | — | May 21, 2004 | Socorro | LINEAR | · | 1.6 km | MPC · JPL |
| 220589 | 2004 KZ_{12} | — | May 20, 2004 | Bergisch Gladbach | W. Bickel | · | 2.3 km | MPC · JPL |
| 220590 | 2004 KE_{15} | — | May 24, 2004 | Socorro | LINEAR | ADE | 2.9 km | MPC · JPL |
| 220591 | 2004 LB_{4} | — | June 7, 2004 | Catalina | CSS | · | 2.4 km | MPC · JPL |
| 220592 | 2004 LY_{14} | — | June 11, 2004 | Palomar | NEAT | · | 1.8 km | MPC · JPL |
| 220593 | 2004 LG_{23} | — | June 15, 2004 | Socorro | LINEAR | LEO | 2.9 km | MPC · JPL |
| 220594 | 2004 NQ_{4} | — | July 12, 2004 | Reedy Creek | J. Broughton | AEO | 1.4 km | MPC · JPL |
| 220595 | 2004 NR_{4} | — | July 9, 2004 | Palomar | NEAT | · | 3.5 km | MPC · JPL |
| 220596 | 2004 NK_{6} | — | July 11, 2004 | Socorro | LINEAR | · | 2.1 km | MPC · JPL |
| 220597 | 2004 NP_{15} | — | July 11, 2004 | Socorro | LINEAR | · | 3.3 km | MPC · JPL |
| 220598 | 2004 NG_{17} | — | July 11, 2004 | Socorro | LINEAR | · | 2.8 km | MPC · JPL |
| 220599 | 2004 NY_{18} | — | July 14, 2004 | Socorro | LINEAR | · | 2.0 km | MPC · JPL |
| 220600 | 2004 NB_{23} | — | July 11, 2004 | Palomar | NEAT | (32418) | 2.5 km | MPC · JPL |

== 220601–220700 ==
back to top

| Designation | | | Discovery | | | Properties | | Ref |
| Permanent | Provisional | Named after | Date | Site | Discoverer(s) | Category | Diam. | Ref |
|---|---|---|---|---|---|---|---|---|
| 220601 | 2004 OP_{1} | — | July 16, 2004 | Socorro | LINEAR | DOR | 3.4 km | MPC · JPL |
| 220602 | 2004 OE_{8} | — | July 16, 2004 | Socorro | LINEAR | DOR | 3.3 km | MPC · JPL |
| 220603 | 2004 OX_{9} | — | July 20, 2004 | Reedy Creek | J. Broughton | (13314) | 2.4 km | MPC · JPL |
| 220604 | 2004 PA_{1} | — | August 6, 2004 | Palomar | NEAT | MRX | 1.7 km | MPC · JPL |
| 220605 | 2004 PB_{6} | — | August 6, 2004 | Palomar | NEAT | GEF | 1.7 km | MPC · JPL |
| 220606 | 2004 PH_{6} | — | August 6, 2004 | Palomar | NEAT | MRX | 1.5 km | MPC · JPL |
| 220607 | 2004 PY_{6} | — | August 6, 2004 | Palomar | NEAT | GEF | 2.0 km | MPC · JPL |
| 220608 | 2004 PQ_{12} | — | August 7, 2004 | Palomar | NEAT | · | 3.0 km | MPC · JPL |
| 220609 | 2004 PS_{14} | — | August 7, 2004 | Palomar | NEAT | · | 3.2 km | MPC · JPL |
| 220610 | 2004 PY_{16} | — | August 7, 2004 | Campo Imperatore | CINEOS | · | 3.0 km | MPC · JPL |
| 220611 | 2004 PT_{20} | — | August 6, 2004 | Palomar | NEAT | · | 3.0 km | MPC · JPL |
| 220612 | 2004 PQ_{21} | — | August 8, 2004 | Palomar | NEAT | MRX | 1.5 km | MPC · JPL |
| 220613 | 2004 PC_{37} | — | August 9, 2004 | Socorro | LINEAR | · | 3.6 km | MPC · JPL |
| 220614 | 2004 PH_{54} | — | August 8, 2004 | Anderson Mesa | LONEOS | · | 3.2 km | MPC · JPL |
| 220615 | 2004 PL_{54} | — | August 8, 2004 | Anderson Mesa | LONEOS | · | 2.8 km | MPC · JPL |
| 220616 | 2004 PC_{57} | — | August 9, 2004 | Socorro | LINEAR | HOF | 3.8 km | MPC · JPL |
| 220617 | 2004 PT_{67} | — | August 6, 2004 | Palomar | NEAT | · | 2.1 km | MPC · JPL |
| 220618 | 2004 PP_{77} | — | August 9, 2004 | Socorro | LINEAR | · | 2.7 km | MPC · JPL |
| 220619 | 2004 PJ_{78} | — | August 9, 2004 | Socorro | LINEAR | · | 3.2 km | MPC · JPL |
| 220620 | 2004 PA_{79} | — | August 9, 2004 | Socorro | LINEAR | · | 4.0 km | MPC · JPL |
| 220621 | 2004 PH_{83} | — | August 10, 2004 | Socorro | LINEAR | · | 3.4 km | MPC · JPL |
| 220622 | 2004 PH_{91} | — | August 11, 2004 | Socorro | LINEAR | · | 6.7 km | MPC · JPL |
| 220623 | 2004 PT_{93} | — | August 9, 2004 | Socorro | LINEAR | · | 3.6 km | MPC · JPL |
| 220624 | 2004 PY_{96} | — | August 10, 2004 | Socorro | LINEAR | GEF | 2.2 km | MPC · JPL |
| 220625 | 2004 PS_{97} | — | August 14, 2004 | Palomar | NEAT | · | 3.4 km | MPC · JPL |
| 220626 | 2004 PT_{100} | — | August 15, 2004 | Nashville | Clingan, R. | · | 2.3 km | MPC · JPL |
| 220627 | 2004 PK_{102} | — | August 12, 2004 | Socorro | LINEAR | (16286) | 3.5 km | MPC · JPL |
| 220628 | 2004 PK_{104} | — | August 12, 2004 | Siding Spring | SSS | ADE | 4.2 km | MPC · JPL |
| 220629 | 2004 PE_{105} | — | August 15, 2004 | Kleť | Kleť | AGN | 1.4 km | MPC · JPL |
| 220630 | 2004 PQ_{105} | — | August 13, 2004 | Palomar | NEAT | · | 3.3 km | MPC · JPL |
| 220631 | 2004 QH_{5} | — | August 21, 2004 | Reedy Creek | J. Broughton | · | 3.5 km | MPC · JPL |
| 220632 | 2004 QT_{14} | — | August 21, 2004 | Catalina | CSS | · | 3.7 km | MPC · JPL |
| 220633 | 2004 QV_{19} | — | August 21, 2004 | Catalina | CSS | GEF | 2.2 km | MPC · JPL |
| 220634 | 2004 QC_{25} | — | August 30, 2004 | Wrightwood | J. W. Young | KOR | 2.0 km | MPC · JPL |
| 220635 | 2004 QQ_{25} | — | August 26, 2004 | Siding Spring | SSS | H | 790 m | MPC · JPL |
| 220636 | 2004 RL_{19} | — | September 7, 2004 | Kitt Peak | Spacewatch | · | 2.4 km | MPC · JPL |
| 220637 | 2004 RQ_{21} | — | September 7, 2004 | Kitt Peak | Spacewatch | · | 2.3 km | MPC · JPL |
| 220638 | 2004 RM_{31} | — | September 7, 2004 | Socorro | LINEAR | · | 2.5 km | MPC · JPL |
| 220639 | 2004 RT_{40} | — | September 7, 2004 | Socorro | LINEAR | BRA | 2.8 km | MPC · JPL |
| 220640 | 2004 RY_{40} | — | September 7, 2004 | Kitt Peak | Spacewatch | KOR | 1.5 km | MPC · JPL |
| 220641 | 2004 RT_{43} | — | September 8, 2004 | Socorro | LINEAR | · | 2.5 km | MPC · JPL |
| 220642 | 2004 RA_{52} | — | September 8, 2004 | Socorro | LINEAR | EOS | 2.9 km | MPC · JPL |
| 220643 | 2004 RR_{56} | — | September 8, 2004 | Socorro | LINEAR | · | 3.4 km | MPC · JPL |
| 220644 | 2004 RW_{57} | — | September 8, 2004 | Socorro | LINEAR | · | 2.8 km | MPC · JPL |
| 220645 | 2004 RR_{65} | — | September 8, 2004 | Socorro | LINEAR | KOR | 2.3 km | MPC · JPL |
| 220646 | 2004 RN_{68} | — | September 8, 2004 | Socorro | LINEAR | · | 3.2 km | MPC · JPL |
| 220647 | 2004 RY_{71} | — | September 8, 2004 | Socorro | LINEAR | · | 3.0 km | MPC · JPL |
| 220648 | 2004 RP_{83} | — | September 9, 2004 | Socorro | LINEAR | · | 4.2 km | MPC · JPL |
| 220649 | 2004 RG_{86} | — | September 7, 2004 | Socorro | LINEAR | · | 2.8 km | MPC · JPL |
| 220650 | 2004 RU_{93} | — | September 8, 2004 | Socorro | LINEAR | · | 3.5 km | MPC · JPL |
| 220651 | 2004 RK_{101} | — | September 8, 2004 | Socorro | LINEAR | · | 4.5 km | MPC · JPL |
| 220652 | 2004 RD_{104} | — | September 8, 2004 | Palomar | NEAT | · | 4.2 km | MPC · JPL |
| 220653 | 2004 RH_{105} | — | September 8, 2004 | Palomar | NEAT | · | 4.0 km | MPC · JPL |
| 220654 | 2004 RX_{122} | — | September 7, 2004 | Kitt Peak | Spacewatch | · | 3.0 km | MPC · JPL |
| 220655 | 2004 RG_{130} | — | September 7, 2004 | Kitt Peak | Spacewatch | KOR | 1.8 km | MPC · JPL |
| 220656 | 2004 RY_{138} | — | September 8, 2004 | Palomar | NEAT | · | 3.7 km | MPC · JPL |
| 220657 | 2004 RA_{145} | — | September 9, 2004 | Socorro | LINEAR | · | 2.9 km | MPC · JPL |
| 220658 | 2004 RO_{148} | — | September 9, 2004 | Socorro | LINEAR | KOR | 2.2 km | MPC · JPL |
| 220659 | 2004 RN_{154} | — | September 10, 2004 | Socorro | LINEAR | · | 3.2 km | MPC · JPL |
| 220660 | 2004 RL_{163} | — | September 11, 2004 | Socorro | LINEAR | · | 5.2 km | MPC · JPL |
| 220661 | 2004 RJ_{164} | — | September 11, 2004 | Socorro | LINEAR | · | 5.3 km | MPC · JPL |
| 220662 | 2004 RW_{167} | — | September 7, 2004 | Kitt Peak | Spacewatch | · | 3.9 km | MPC · JPL |
| 220663 | 2004 RG_{179} | — | September 10, 2004 | Socorro | LINEAR | · | 4.2 km | MPC · JPL |
| 220664 | 2004 RU_{180} | — | September 10, 2004 | Socorro | LINEAR | · | 3.1 km | MPC · JPL |
| 220665 | 2004 RA_{187} | — | September 10, 2004 | Socorro | LINEAR | · | 3.2 km | MPC · JPL |
| 220666 | 2004 RN_{187} | — | September 10, 2004 | Socorro | LINEAR | · | 4.1 km | MPC · JPL |
| 220667 | 2004 RQ_{192} | — | September 10, 2004 | Socorro | LINEAR | · | 5.3 km | MPC · JPL |
| 220668 | 2004 RY_{197} | — | September 10, 2004 | Socorro | LINEAR | EOS | 2.8 km | MPC · JPL |
| 220669 | 2004 RT_{198} | — | September 10, 2004 | Socorro | LINEAR | EOS | 2.9 km | MPC · JPL |
| 220670 | 2004 RF_{200} | — | September 10, 2004 | Socorro | LINEAR | · | 3.5 km | MPC · JPL |
| 220671 | 2004 RK_{201} | — | September 10, 2004 | Socorro | LINEAR | · | 5.2 km | MPC · JPL |
| 220672 | 2004 RR_{201} | — | September 10, 2004 | Kitt Peak | Spacewatch | · | 5.3 km | MPC · JPL |
| 220673 | 2004 RQ_{208} | — | September 11, 2004 | Socorro | LINEAR | · | 4.3 km | MPC · JPL |
| 220674 | 2004 RC_{214} | — | September 11, 2004 | Socorro | LINEAR | · | 3.0 km | MPC · JPL |
| 220675 | 2004 RR_{216} | — | September 11, 2004 | Socorro | LINEAR | · | 5.2 km | MPC · JPL |
| 220676 | 2004 RL_{217} | — | September 11, 2004 | Socorro | LINEAR | · | 5.2 km | MPC · JPL |
| 220677 | 2004 RY_{218} | — | September 11, 2004 | Socorro | LINEAR | · | 5.4 km | MPC · JPL |
| 220678 | 2004 RB_{219} | — | September 11, 2004 | Socorro | LINEAR | · | 4.1 km | MPC · JPL |
| 220679 | 2004 RR_{220} | — | September 11, 2004 | Socorro | LINEAR | · | 5.5 km | MPC · JPL |
| 220680 | 2004 RV_{220} | — | September 11, 2004 | Socorro | LINEAR | · | 4.9 km | MPC · JPL |
| 220681 | 2004 RX_{220} | — | September 11, 2004 | Socorro | LINEAR | · | 2.5 km | MPC · JPL |
| 220682 | 2004 RY_{220} | — | September 11, 2004 | Socorro | LINEAR | URS | 4.4 km | MPC · JPL |
| 220683 | 2004 RJ_{227} | — | September 9, 2004 | Kitt Peak | Spacewatch | HYG | 4.3 km | MPC · JPL |
| 220684 | 2004 RR_{229} | — | September 9, 2004 | Kitt Peak | Spacewatch | · | 4.2 km | MPC · JPL |
| 220685 | 2004 RG_{233} | — | September 9, 2004 | Kitt Peak | Spacewatch | · | 3.4 km | MPC · JPL |
| 220686 | 2004 RQ_{246} | — | September 10, 2004 | Kitt Peak | Spacewatch | · | 3.7 km | MPC · JPL |
| 220687 | 2004 RZ_{265} | — | September 10, 2004 | Kitt Peak | Spacewatch | · | 2.1 km | MPC · JPL |
| 220688 | 2004 RQ_{287} | — | September 15, 2004 | 7300 | W. K. Y. Yeung | · | 4.2 km | MPC · JPL |
| 220689 | 2004 RR_{287} | — | September 15, 2004 | 7300 | W. K. Y. Yeung | EOS | 3.0 km | MPC · JPL |
| 220690 | 2004 RQ_{290} | — | September 8, 2004 | Socorro | LINEAR | · | 3.0 km | MPC · JPL |
| 220691 | 2004 RY_{290} | — | September 9, 2004 | Kitt Peak | Spacewatch | · | 2.4 km | MPC · JPL |
| 220692 | 2004 RK_{292} | — | September 10, 2004 | Socorro | LINEAR | · | 2.3 km | MPC · JPL |
| 220693 | 2004 RN_{309} | — | September 13, 2004 | Socorro | LINEAR | EOS | 3.2 km | MPC · JPL |
| 220694 | 2004 RS_{309} | — | September 13, 2004 | Socorro | LINEAR | · | 2.9 km | MPC · JPL |
| 220695 | 2004 RY_{313} | — | September 15, 2004 | Kitt Peak | Spacewatch | · | 3.1 km | MPC · JPL |
| 220696 | 2004 RA_{316} | — | September 8, 2004 | Socorro | LINEAR | · | 3.1 km | MPC · JPL |
| 220697 | 2004 RC_{320} | — | September 13, 2004 | Socorro | LINEAR | · | 6.2 km | MPC · JPL |
| 220698 | 2004 RF_{322} | — | September 13, 2004 | Socorro | LINEAR | · | 5.7 km | MPC · JPL |
| 220699 | 2004 RL_{322} | — | September 13, 2004 | Socorro | LINEAR | TEL | 2.2 km | MPC · JPL |
| 220700 | 2004 RH_{323} | — | September 13, 2004 | Socorro | LINEAR | · | 3.5 km | MPC · JPL |

== 220701–220800 ==
back to top

| Designation | | | Discovery | | | Properties | | Ref |
| Permanent | Provisional | Named after | Date | Site | Discoverer(s) | Category | Diam. | Ref |
|---|---|---|---|---|---|---|---|---|
| 220701 | 2004 RX_{324} | — | September 13, 2004 | Socorro | LINEAR | EOS | 2.9 km | MPC · JPL |
| 220702 | 2004 RH_{325} | — | September 13, 2004 | Socorro | LINEAR | · | 4.6 km | MPC · JPL |
| 220703 | 2004 RJ_{325} | — | September 13, 2004 | Socorro | LINEAR | H | 660 m | MPC · JPL |
| 220704 | 2004 RK_{325} | — | September 13, 2004 | Socorro | LINEAR | · | 6.6 km | MPC · JPL |
| 220705 | 2004 RU_{325} | — | September 13, 2004 | Socorro | LINEAR | · | 5.1 km | MPC · JPL |
| 220706 | 2004 RM_{337} | — | September 15, 2004 | Kitt Peak | Spacewatch | · | 4.0 km | MPC · JPL |
| 220707 | 2004 RC_{345} | — | September 7, 2004 | Kitt Peak | Spacewatch | KOR | 1.8 km | MPC · JPL |
| 220708 | 2004 RL_{345} | — | September 10, 2004 | Socorro | LINEAR | · | 3.6 km | MPC · JPL |
| 220709 | 2004 SB_{3} | — | September 16, 2004 | Kitt Peak | Spacewatch | KOR | 1.9 km | MPC · JPL |
| 220710 | 2004 SK_{8} | — | September 17, 2004 | Socorro | LINEAR | · | 2.5 km | MPC · JPL |
| 220711 | 2004 SJ_{12} | — | September 16, 2004 | Siding Spring | SSS | EUN | 2.5 km | MPC · JPL |
| 220712 | 2004 SL_{14} | — | September 17, 2004 | Anderson Mesa | LONEOS | EOS | 3.2 km | MPC · JPL |
| 220713 | 2004 SS_{17} | — | September 17, 2004 | Anderson Mesa | LONEOS | EMA | 3.9 km | MPC · JPL |
| 220714 | 2004 SR_{19} | — | September 18, 2004 | Socorro | LINEAR | · | 2.6 km | MPC · JPL |
| 220715 | 2004 ST_{19} | — | September 18, 2004 | Socorro | LINEAR | · | 6.7 km | MPC · JPL |
| 220716 | 2004 SX_{25} | — | September 22, 2004 | Desert Eagle | W. K. Y. Yeung | · | 3.1 km | MPC · JPL |
| 220717 | 2004 SX_{26} | — | September 21, 2004 | Socorro | LINEAR | H | 930 m | MPC · JPL |
| 220718 | 2004 SX_{30} | — | September 17, 2004 | Socorro | LINEAR | EOS | 2.7 km | MPC · JPL |
| 220719 | 2004 SV_{38} | — | September 17, 2004 | Socorro | LINEAR | · | 4.5 km | MPC · JPL |
| 220720 | 2004 SA_{39} | — | September 17, 2004 | Socorro | LINEAR | · | 3.9 km | MPC · JPL |
| 220721 | 2004 SL_{39} | — | September 17, 2004 | Socorro | LINEAR | · | 2.8 km | MPC · JPL |
| 220722 | 2004 SZ_{39} | — | September 17, 2004 | Socorro | LINEAR | · | 4.4 km | MPC · JPL |
| 220723 | 2004 SP_{45} | — | September 18, 2004 | Socorro | LINEAR | NAE | 4.0 km | MPC · JPL |
| 220724 | 2004 SL_{47} | — | September 18, 2004 | Socorro | LINEAR | EOS | 2.9 km | MPC · JPL |
| 220725 | 2004 SQ_{49} | — | September 21, 2004 | Socorro | LINEAR | · | 4.6 km | MPC · JPL |
| 220726 | 2004 SV_{50} | — | September 22, 2004 | Kitt Peak | Spacewatch | · | 2.5 km | MPC · JPL |
| 220727 | 2004 SN_{51} | — | September 17, 2004 | Socorro | LINEAR | EOS | 2.8 km | MPC · JPL |
| 220728 | 2004 SA_{52} | — | September 17, 2004 | Socorro | LINEAR | · | 4.6 km | MPC · JPL |
| 220729 | 2004 SM_{54} | — | September 22, 2004 | Socorro | LINEAR | · | 4.9 km | MPC · JPL |
| 220730 | 2004 SO_{58} | — | September 16, 2004 | Anderson Mesa | LONEOS | · | 4.5 km | MPC · JPL |
| 220731 | 2004 SM_{59} | — | September 23, 2004 | Socorro | LINEAR | EOS | 3.8 km | MPC · JPL |
| 220732 | 2004 TV | — | October 4, 2004 | Kitt Peak | Spacewatch | · | 7.8 km | MPC · JPL |
| 220733 | 2004 TS_{11} | — | October 7, 2004 | Kitt Peak | Spacewatch | · | 2.4 km | MPC · JPL |
| 220734 | 2004 TM_{15} | — | October 9, 2004 | Socorro | LINEAR | THB | 6.5 km | MPC · JPL |
| 220735 | 2004 TO_{15} | — | October 9, 2004 | Kitt Peak | Spacewatch | · | 4.0 km | MPC · JPL |
| 220736 Niihama | 2004 TR_{16} | Niihama | October 11, 2004 | Nakagawa | Hori, H., Maeno, H. | · | 5.3 km | MPC · JPL |
| 220737 | 2004 TJ_{17} | — | October 10, 2004 | Kitt Peak | Spacewatch | · | 2.7 km | MPC · JPL |
| 220738 | 2004 TH_{19} | — | October 13, 2004 | Socorro | LINEAR | · | 8.8 km | MPC · JPL |
| 220739 | 2004 TU_{19} | — | October 14, 2004 | Goodricke-Pigott | R. A. Tucker | · | 3.3 km | MPC · JPL |
| 220740 | 2004 TJ_{21} | — | October 3, 2004 | Palomar | NEAT | · | 3.8 km | MPC · JPL |
| 220741 | 2004 TD_{24} | — | October 4, 2004 | Kitt Peak | Spacewatch | · | 2.9 km | MPC · JPL |
| 220742 | 2004 TO_{28} | — | October 4, 2004 | Kitt Peak | Spacewatch | · | 2.7 km | MPC · JPL |
| 220743 | 2004 TO_{33} | — | October 4, 2004 | Kitt Peak | Spacewatch | · | 3.1 km | MPC · JPL |
| 220744 | 2004 TW_{41} | — | October 4, 2004 | Kitt Peak | Spacewatch | · | 4.3 km | MPC · JPL |
| 220745 | 2004 TO_{60} | — | October 5, 2004 | Anderson Mesa | LONEOS | · | 3.5 km | MPC · JPL |
| 220746 | 2004 TY_{60} | — | October 5, 2004 | Kitt Peak | Spacewatch | · | 2.3 km | MPC · JPL |
| 220747 | 2004 TL_{65} | — | October 5, 2004 | Palomar | NEAT | · | 4.2 km | MPC · JPL |
| 220748 | 2004 TG_{68} | — | October 5, 2004 | Anderson Mesa | LONEOS | · | 5.2 km | MPC · JPL |
| 220749 | 2004 TO_{69} | — | October 5, 2004 | Anderson Mesa | LONEOS | EOS | 2.6 km | MPC · JPL |
| 220750 | 2004 TT_{69} | — | October 5, 2004 | Powell | Powell | · | 4.7 km | MPC · JPL |
| 220751 | 2004 TH_{72} | — | October 6, 2004 | Kitt Peak | Spacewatch | · | 2.3 km | MPC · JPL |
| 220752 | 2004 TG_{76} | — | October 7, 2004 | Kitt Peak | Spacewatch | · | 1.8 km | MPC · JPL |
| 220753 | 2004 TQ_{79} | — | October 4, 2004 | Socorro | LINEAR | · | 4.9 km | MPC · JPL |
| 220754 | 2004 TV_{85} | — | October 5, 2004 | Kitt Peak | Spacewatch | · | 2.7 km | MPC · JPL |
| 220755 | 2004 TZ_{88} | — | October 5, 2004 | Kitt Peak | Spacewatch | · | 3.8 km | MPC · JPL |
| 220756 | 2004 TQ_{94} | — | October 5, 2004 | Kitt Peak | Spacewatch | · | 3.2 km | MPC · JPL |
| 220757 | 2004 TH_{101} | — | October 6, 2004 | Kitt Peak | Spacewatch | · | 2.7 km | MPC · JPL |
| 220758 | 2004 TV_{101} | — | October 6, 2004 | Kitt Peak | Spacewatch | · | 2.6 km | MPC · JPL |
| 220759 | 2004 TG_{105} | — | October 7, 2004 | Kitt Peak | Spacewatch | EOS | 2.3 km | MPC · JPL |
| 220760 | 2004 TO_{105} | — | October 7, 2004 | Kitt Peak | Spacewatch | KOR | 1.9 km | MPC · JPL |
| 220761 | 2004 TR_{109} | — | October 7, 2004 | Socorro | LINEAR | · | 3.4 km | MPC · JPL |
| 220762 | 2004 TN_{116} | — | October 4, 2004 | Anderson Mesa | LONEOS | EOS | 3.2 km | MPC · JPL |
| 220763 | 2004 TQ_{117} | — | October 5, 2004 | Anderson Mesa | LONEOS | · | 3.2 km | MPC · JPL |
| 220764 | 2004 TK_{118} | — | October 5, 2004 | Palomar | NEAT | · | 4.2 km | MPC · JPL |
| 220765 | 2004 TA_{120} | — | October 6, 2004 | Palomar | NEAT | · | 3.4 km | MPC · JPL |
| 220766 | 2004 TN_{121} | — | October 7, 2004 | Anderson Mesa | LONEOS | · | 3.6 km | MPC · JPL |
| 220767 | 2004 TW_{122} | — | October 7, 2004 | Anderson Mesa | LONEOS | · | 2.7 km | MPC · JPL |
| 220768 | 2004 TK_{126} | — | October 7, 2004 | Socorro | LINEAR | EOS | 2.7 km | MPC · JPL |
| 220769 | 2004 TP_{128} | — | October 7, 2004 | Socorro | LINEAR | · | 5.5 km | MPC · JPL |
| 220770 | 2004 TU_{129} | — | October 7, 2004 | Socorro | LINEAR | · | 2.7 km | MPC · JPL |
| 220771 | 2004 TK_{130} | — | October 7, 2004 | Socorro | LINEAR | EOS | 2.5 km | MPC · JPL |
| 220772 | 2004 TJ_{131} | — | October 7, 2004 | Anderson Mesa | LONEOS | · | 4.3 km | MPC · JPL |
| 220773 | 2004 TZ_{132} | — | October 7, 2004 | Anderson Mesa | LONEOS | H | 820 m | MPC · JPL |
| 220774 | 2004 TB_{135} | — | October 8, 2004 | Anderson Mesa | LONEOS | · | 2.5 km | MPC · JPL |
| 220775 | 2004 TA_{137} | — | October 8, 2004 | Anderson Mesa | LONEOS | · | 4.5 km | MPC · JPL |
| 220776 | 2004 TB_{137} | — | October 8, 2004 | Anderson Mesa | LONEOS | · | 5.1 km | MPC · JPL |
| 220777 | 2004 TU_{137} | — | October 8, 2004 | Anderson Mesa | LONEOS | VER | 5.4 km | MPC · JPL |
| 220778 | 2004 TY_{138} | — | October 9, 2004 | Anderson Mesa | LONEOS | EOS | 2.8 km | MPC · JPL |
| 220779 | 2004 TL_{139} | — | October 9, 2004 | Anderson Mesa | LONEOS | · | 5.0 km | MPC · JPL |
| 220780 | 2004 TR_{139} | — | October 9, 2004 | Anderson Mesa | LONEOS | H | 750 m | MPC · JPL |
| 220781 | 2004 TD_{144} | — | October 4, 2004 | Kitt Peak | Spacewatch | · | 3.3 km | MPC · JPL |
| 220782 | 2004 TB_{149} | — | October 6, 2004 | Kitt Peak | Spacewatch | · | 3.5 km | MPC · JPL |
| 220783 | 2004 TT_{167} | — | October 7, 2004 | Kitt Peak | Spacewatch | · | 2.3 km | MPC · JPL |
| 220784 | 2004 TC_{168} | — | October 7, 2004 | Socorro | LINEAR | · | 2.9 km | MPC · JPL |
| 220785 | 2004 TV_{168} | — | October 7, 2004 | Socorro | LINEAR | · | 2.5 km | MPC · JPL |
| 220786 | 2004 TM_{172} | — | October 8, 2004 | Socorro | LINEAR | · | 4.2 km | MPC · JPL |
| 220787 | 2004 TU_{173} | — | October 8, 2004 | Socorro | LINEAR | · | 6.0 km | MPC · JPL |
| 220788 | 2004 TA_{174} | — | October 9, 2004 | Socorro | LINEAR | · | 2.1 km | MPC · JPL |
| 220789 | 2004 TD_{175} | — | October 9, 2004 | Socorro | LINEAR | HYG | 3.8 km | MPC · JPL |
| 220790 | 2004 TJ_{175} | — | October 9, 2004 | Socorro | LINEAR | EOS | 2.8 km | MPC · JPL |
| 220791 | 2004 TE_{179} | — | October 7, 2004 | Kitt Peak | Spacewatch | EOS | 2.1 km | MPC · JPL |
| 220792 | 2004 TY_{179} | — | October 7, 2004 | Kitt Peak | Spacewatch | KOR | 2.0 km | MPC · JPL |
| 220793 | 2004 TN_{196} | — | October 7, 2004 | Kitt Peak | Spacewatch | · | 2.4 km | MPC · JPL |
| 220794 | 2004 TE_{197} | — | October 7, 2004 | Kitt Peak | Spacewatch | · | 2.9 km | MPC · JPL |
| 220795 | 2004 TV_{198} | — | October 7, 2004 | Kitt Peak | Spacewatch | KOR | 1.9 km | MPC · JPL |
| 220796 | 2004 TC_{213} | — | October 8, 2004 | Kitt Peak | Spacewatch | · | 4.5 km | MPC · JPL |
| 220797 | 2004 TD_{216} | — | October 15, 2004 | Goodricke-Pigott | Goodricke-Pigott | · | 3.2 km | MPC · JPL |
| 220798 | 2004 TF_{220} | — | October 5, 2004 | Socorro | LINEAR | DOR | 5.7 km | MPC · JPL |
| 220799 | 2004 TF_{222} | — | October 7, 2004 | Socorro | LINEAR | · | 3.6 km | MPC · JPL |
| 220800 | 2004 TU_{222} | — | October 7, 2004 | Kitt Peak | Spacewatch | HYG | 3.9 km | MPC · JPL |

== 220801–220900 ==
back to top

| Designation | | | Discovery | | | Properties | | Ref |
| Permanent | Provisional | Named after | Date | Site | Discoverer(s) | Category | Diam. | Ref |
|---|---|---|---|---|---|---|---|---|
| 220801 | 2004 TD_{223} | — | October 7, 2004 | Socorro | LINEAR | · | 5.2 km | MPC · JPL |
| 220802 | 2004 TL_{230} | — | October 8, 2004 | Kitt Peak | Spacewatch | KOR | 1.8 km | MPC · JPL |
| 220803 | 2004 TR_{231} | — | October 8, 2004 | Kitt Peak | Spacewatch | · | 3.7 km | MPC · JPL |
| 220804 | 2004 TO_{241} | — | October 10, 2004 | Socorro | LINEAR | · | 4.8 km | MPC · JPL |
| 220805 | 2004 TY_{241} | — | October 10, 2004 | Socorro | LINEAR | EOS | 3.2 km | MPC · JPL |
| 220806 | 2004 TA_{242} | — | October 10, 2004 | Socorro | LINEAR | · | 2.9 km | MPC · JPL |
| 220807 | 2004 TM_{243} | — | October 6, 2004 | Kitt Peak | Spacewatch | · | 3.1 km | MPC · JPL |
| 220808 | 2004 TC_{247} | — | October 7, 2004 | Socorro | LINEAR | · | 4.2 km | MPC · JPL |
| 220809 | 2004 TE_{247} | — | October 7, 2004 | Socorro | LINEAR | EOS | 3.4 km | MPC · JPL |
| 220810 | 2004 TU_{247} | — | October 7, 2004 | Socorro | LINEAR | · | 4.8 km | MPC · JPL |
| 220811 | 2004 TZ_{249} | — | October 7, 2004 | Kitt Peak | Spacewatch | · | 5.7 km | MPC · JPL |
| 220812 | 2004 TQ_{250} | — | October 8, 2004 | Socorro | LINEAR | · | 3.1 km | MPC · JPL |
| 220813 | 2004 TR_{251} | — | October 9, 2004 | Kitt Peak | Spacewatch | · | 2.6 km | MPC · JPL |
| 220814 | 2004 TL_{261} | — | October 9, 2004 | Kitt Peak | Spacewatch | · | 2.3 km | MPC · JPL |
| 220815 | 2004 TZ_{273} | — | October 9, 2004 | Kitt Peak | Spacewatch | THM | 4.5 km | MPC · JPL |
| 220816 | 2004 TW_{280} | — | October 10, 2004 | Kitt Peak | Spacewatch | · | 2.4 km | MPC · JPL |
| 220817 | 2004 TX_{294} | — | October 10, 2004 | Kitt Peak | Spacewatch | · | 3.6 km | MPC · JPL |
| 220818 | 2004 TB_{302} | — | October 9, 2004 | Anderson Mesa | LONEOS | · | 4.4 km | MPC · JPL |
| 220819 | 2004 TD_{303} | — | October 9, 2004 | Kitt Peak | Spacewatch | EOS | 3.3 km | MPC · JPL |
| 220820 | 2004 TH_{303} | — | October 9, 2004 | Kitt Peak | Spacewatch | · | 3.3 km | MPC · JPL |
| 220821 | 2004 TE_{310} | — | October 10, 2004 | Socorro | LINEAR | · | 4.5 km | MPC · JPL |
| 220822 | 2004 TU_{310} | — | October 10, 2004 | Socorro | LINEAR | T_{j} (2.98) | 5.4 km | MPC · JPL |
| 220823 | 2004 TY_{310} | — | October 10, 2004 | Socorro | LINEAR | EOS | 3.1 km | MPC · JPL |
| 220824 | 2004 TE_{311} | — | October 10, 2004 | Palomar | NEAT | EOS | 3.1 km | MPC · JPL |
| 220825 | 2004 TX_{312} | — | October 11, 2004 | Kitt Peak | Spacewatch | · | 2.6 km | MPC · JPL |
| 220826 | 2004 TO_{325} | — | October 13, 2004 | Anderson Mesa | LONEOS | · | 5.1 km | MPC · JPL |
| 220827 | 2004 TS_{336} | — | October 10, 2004 | Kitt Peak | Spacewatch | · | 3.6 km | MPC · JPL |
| 220828 | 2004 TG_{339} | — | October 13, 2004 | Kitt Peak | Spacewatch | · | 3.2 km | MPC · JPL |
| 220829 | 2004 TS_{346} | — | October 15, 2004 | Anderson Mesa | LONEOS | · | 2.8 km | MPC · JPL |
| 220830 | 2004 TY_{347} | — | October 4, 2004 | Kitt Peak | Spacewatch | · | 2.2 km | MPC · JPL |
| 220831 | 2004 TE_{360} | — | October 10, 2004 | Socorro | LINEAR | · | 5.0 km | MPC · JPL |
| 220832 | 2004 TJ_{360} | — | October 10, 2004 | Socorro | LINEAR | · | 4.7 km | MPC · JPL |
| 220833 | 2004 TX_{361} | — | October 13, 2004 | Anderson Mesa | LONEOS | · | 5.8 km | MPC · JPL |
| 220834 | 2004 TQ_{366} | — | October 8, 2004 | Palomar | NEAT | LIX | 5.1 km | MPC · JPL |
| 220835 | 2004 UP_{4} | — | October 16, 2004 | Socorro | LINEAR | EUP | 7.3 km | MPC · JPL |
| 220836 | 2004 UE_{7} | — | October 21, 2004 | Socorro | LINEAR | · | 2.7 km | MPC · JPL |
| 220837 | 2004 UA_{9} | — | October 23, 2004 | Socorro | LINEAR | · | 4.8 km | MPC · JPL |
| 220838 | 2004 UD_{9} | — | October 23, 2004 | Socorro | LINEAR | AEG | 5.7 km | MPC · JPL |
| 220839 | 2004 VA | — | November 1, 2004 | Anderson Mesa | LONEOS | APO +1km · PHA | 1.1 km | MPC · JPL |
| 220840 | 2004 VQ | — | November 2, 2004 | Anderson Mesa | LONEOS | HYG | 4.0 km | MPC · JPL |
| 220841 | 2004 VB_{2} | — | November 2, 2004 | Anderson Mesa | LONEOS | · | 6.8 km | MPC · JPL |
| 220842 | 2004 VD_{2} | — | November 2, 2004 | Anderson Mesa | LONEOS | THM | 4.3 km | MPC · JPL |
| 220843 | 2004 VE_{3} | — | November 3, 2004 | Kitt Peak | Spacewatch | · | 3.4 km | MPC · JPL |
| 220844 | 2004 VY_{5} | — | November 3, 2004 | Kitt Peak | Spacewatch | · | 3.7 km | MPC · JPL |
| 220845 | 2004 VP_{6} | — | November 3, 2004 | Kitt Peak | Spacewatch | THM | 3.3 km | MPC · JPL |
| 220846 | 2004 VD_{8} | — | November 3, 2004 | Kitt Peak | Spacewatch | · | 3.8 km | MPC · JPL |
| 220847 | 2004 VE_{14} | — | November 4, 2004 | Anderson Mesa | LONEOS | · | 4.5 km | MPC · JPL |
| 220848 | 2004 VK_{26} | — | November 4, 2004 | Catalina | CSS | · | 5.1 km | MPC · JPL |
| 220849 | 2004 VZ_{28} | — | November 3, 2004 | Kitt Peak | Spacewatch | · | 2.5 km | MPC · JPL |
| 220850 | 2004 VB_{47} | — | November 4, 2004 | Kitt Peak | Spacewatch | EMA | 6.3 km | MPC · JPL |
| 220851 | 2004 VC_{61} | — | November 5, 2004 | Palomar | NEAT | · | 3.4 km | MPC · JPL |
| 220852 | 2004 VK_{61} | — | November 5, 2004 | Anderson Mesa | LONEOS | EOS | 3.2 km | MPC · JPL |
| 220853 | 2004 VN_{61} | — | November 5, 2004 | Palomar | NEAT | · | 4.5 km | MPC · JPL |
| 220854 | 2004 VP_{61} | — | November 5, 2004 | Anderson Mesa | LONEOS | · | 4.5 km | MPC · JPL |
| 220855 | 2004 VS_{61} | — | November 5, 2004 | Palomar | NEAT | · | 4.5 km | MPC · JPL |
| 220856 | 2004 VK_{62} | — | November 6, 2004 | Socorro | LINEAR | · | 6.5 km | MPC · JPL |
| 220857 | 2004 VY_{70} | — | November 7, 2004 | Socorro | LINEAR | · | 2.9 km | MPC · JPL |
| 220858 | 2004 VT_{72} | — | November 10, 2004 | Socorro | LINEAR | · | 3.4 km | MPC · JPL |
| 220859 | 2004 VQ_{76} | — | November 12, 2004 | Catalina | CSS | · | 6.4 km | MPC · JPL |
| 220860 | 2004 VP_{78} | — | November 11, 2004 | Catalina | CSS | H | 940 m | MPC · JPL |
| 220861 | 2004 VV_{86} | — | November 11, 2004 | Kitt Peak | Spacewatch | · | 4.3 km | MPC · JPL |
| 220862 | 2004 VQ_{90} | — | November 12, 2004 | Catalina | CSS | · | 3.5 km | MPC · JPL |
| 220863 | 2004 VX_{90} | — | November 3, 2004 | Kitt Peak | Spacewatch | · | 5.0 km | MPC · JPL |
| 220864 | 2004 VV_{95} | — | November 11, 2004 | Kitt Peak | Spacewatch | · | 4.5 km | MPC · JPL |
| 220865 | 2004 VR_{96} | — | November 11, 2004 | Kitt Peak | Spacewatch | · | 2.7 km | MPC · JPL |
| 220866 | 2004 WB_{6} | — | November 19, 2004 | Socorro | LINEAR | VER | 3.9 km | MPC · JPL |
| 220867 | 2004 WF_{10} | — | November 18, 2004 | Campo Imperatore | CINEOS | HYG | 3.4 km | MPC · JPL |
| 220868 | 2004 WH_{11} | — | November 30, 2004 | Palomar | NEAT | · | 6.1 km | MPC · JPL |
| 220869 | 2004 WR_{11} | — | November 17, 2004 | Campo Imperatore | CINEOS | · | 3.5 km | MPC · JPL |
| 220870 | 2004 XY_{5} | — | December 1, 2004 | Goodricke-Pigott | Goodricke-Pigott | · | 4.5 km | MPC · JPL |
| 220871 | 2004 XX_{14} | — | December 8, 2004 | Socorro | LINEAR | THM | 3.7 km | MPC · JPL |
| 220872 | 2004 XE_{15} | — | December 8, 2004 | Socorro | LINEAR | · | 4.7 km | MPC · JPL |
| 220873 | 2004 XK_{16} | — | December 10, 2004 | Socorro | LINEAR | H | 810 m | MPC · JPL |
| 220874 | 2004 XT_{21} | — | December 8, 2004 | Socorro | LINEAR | · | 3.4 km | MPC · JPL |
| 220875 | 2004 XZ_{22} | — | December 8, 2004 | Socorro | LINEAR | KOR | 2.4 km | MPC · JPL |
| 220876 | 2004 XE_{23} | — | December 8, 2004 | Socorro | LINEAR | TIR | 4.8 km | MPC · JPL |
| 220877 | 2004 XL_{28} | — | December 10, 2004 | Socorro | LINEAR | THB | 4.5 km | MPC · JPL |
| 220878 | 2004 XJ_{40} | — | December 10, 2004 | Socorro | LINEAR | H | 780 m | MPC · JPL |
| 220879 | 2004 XJ_{64} | — | December 2, 2004 | Socorro | LINEAR | TIR | 4.7 km | MPC · JPL |
| 220880 | 2004 XQ_{64} | — | December 2, 2004 | Kitt Peak | Spacewatch | HYG | 3.9 km | MPC · JPL |
| 220881 | 2004 XZ_{64} | — | December 2, 2004 | Socorro | LINEAR | · | 3.2 km | MPC · JPL |
| 220882 | 2004 XW_{65} | — | December 2, 2004 | Catalina | CSS | · | 4.9 km | MPC · JPL |
| 220883 | 2004 XY_{71} | — | December 13, 2004 | Anderson Mesa | LONEOS | H | 810 m | MPC · JPL |
| 220884 | 2004 XM_{84} | — | December 12, 2004 | Kitt Peak | Spacewatch | THM | 3.4 km | MPC · JPL |
| 220885 | 2004 XP_{89} | — | December 11, 2004 | Socorro | LINEAR | · | 4.9 km | MPC · JPL |
| 220886 Lauren-Yuill | 2004 XE_{103} | Lauren-Yuill | December 14, 2004 | Catalina | CSS | · | 3.5 km | MPC · JPL |
| 220887 | 2004 XR_{107} | — | December 11, 2004 | Socorro | LINEAR | · | 3.2 km | MPC · JPL |
| 220888 | 2004 XD_{112} | — | December 10, 2004 | Kitt Peak | Spacewatch | · | 3.5 km | MPC · JPL |
| 220889 | 2004 XG_{124} | — | December 10, 2004 | Socorro | LINEAR | · | 6.1 km | MPC · JPL |
| 220890 | 2004 XL_{129} | — | December 14, 2004 | Bergisch Gladbach | W. Bickel | · | 4.3 km | MPC · JPL |
| 220891 | 2004 XF_{134} | — | December 15, 2004 | Socorro | LINEAR | · | 4.2 km | MPC · JPL |
| 220892 | 2004 XR_{145} | — | December 14, 2004 | Anderson Mesa | LONEOS | · | 4.7 km | MPC · JPL |
| 220893 | 2004 XX_{165} | — | December 2, 2004 | Catalina | CSS | · | 4.8 km | MPC · JPL |
| 220894 | 2004 XM_{182} | — | December 1, 2004 | Palomar | NEAT | · | 6.3 km | MPC · JPL |
| 220895 | 2004 YB_{1} | — | December 16, 2004 | Catalina | CSS | · | 4.5 km | MPC · JPL |
| 220896 | 2004 YS_{1} | — | December 18, 2004 | Socorro | LINEAR | H | 860 m | MPC · JPL |
| 220897 | 2004 YL_{3} | — | December 16, 2004 | Anderson Mesa | LONEOS | · | 5.4 km | MPC · JPL |
| 220898 | 2004 YT_{5} | — | December 19, 2004 | Socorro | LINEAR | T_{j} (2.98) | 6.1 km | MPC · JPL |
| 220899 | 2004 YU_{9} | — | December 18, 2004 | Mount Lemmon | Mount Lemmon Survey | THM | 3.3 km | MPC · JPL |
| 220900 | 2004 YN_{10} | — | December 18, 2004 | Mount Lemmon | Mount Lemmon Survey | · | 2.9 km | MPC · JPL |

== 220901–221000 ==
back to top

| Designation | | | Discovery | | | Properties | | Ref |
| Permanent | Provisional | Named after | Date | Site | Discoverer(s) | Category | Diam. | Ref |
|---|---|---|---|---|---|---|---|---|
| 220901 | 2004 YX_{12} | — | December 18, 2004 | Mount Lemmon | Mount Lemmon Survey | · | 4.1 km | MPC · JPL |
| 220902 | 2004 YH_{33} | — | December 16, 2004 | Anderson Mesa | LONEOS | · | 3.3 km | MPC · JPL |
| 220903 | 2005 AD_{2} | — | January 6, 2005 | Catalina | CSS | · | 5.0 km | MPC · JPL |
| 220904 | 2005 AJ_{22} | — | January 7, 2005 | Socorro | LINEAR | · | 4.6 km | MPC · JPL |
| 220905 | 2005 AZ_{30} | — | January 11, 2005 | Socorro | LINEAR | · | 8.6 km | MPC · JPL |
| 220906 | 2005 BC_{7} | — | January 16, 2005 | Kitt Peak | Spacewatch | · | 1.2 km | MPC · JPL |
| 220907 | 2005 CB_{59} | — | February 2, 2005 | Socorro | LINEAR | · | 4.7 km | MPC · JPL |
| 220908 | 2005 CL_{59} | — | February 2, 2005 | Catalina | CSS | CYB | 11 km | MPC · JPL |
| 220909 | 2005 EO_{1} | — | March 2, 2005 | Socorro | LINEAR | APO +1km | 830 m | MPC · JPL |
| 220910 | 2005 EK_{131} | — | March 9, 2005 | Catalina | CSS | 3:2 | 8.8 km | MPC · JPL |
| 220911 | 2005 EY_{139} | — | March 9, 2005 | Socorro | LINEAR | · | 1.5 km | MPC · JPL |
| 220912 | 2005 EN_{142} | — | March 10, 2005 | Catalina | CSS | · | 950 m | MPC · JPL |
| 220913 | 2005 EJ_{145} | — | March 10, 2005 | Mount Lemmon | Mount Lemmon Survey | · | 800 m | MPC · JPL |
| 220914 | 2005 ER_{263} | — | March 13, 2005 | Mount Lemmon | Mount Lemmon Survey | · | 870 m | MPC · JPL |
| 220915 | 2005 ER_{323} | — | March 14, 2005 | Mount Lemmon | Mount Lemmon Survey | · | 780 m | MPC · JPL |
| 220916 | 2005 EB_{327} | — | March 9, 2005 | Kitt Peak | Spacewatch | · | 1.1 km | MPC · JPL |
| 220917 | 2005 GQ_{4} | — | April 1, 2005 | Kitt Peak | Spacewatch | · | 1.1 km | MPC · JPL |
| 220918 | 2005 GX_{5} | — | April 1, 2005 | Kitt Peak | Spacewatch | · | 1.0 km | MPC · JPL |
| 220919 | 2005 GC_{7} | — | April 1, 2005 | Kitt Peak | Spacewatch | · | 1 km | MPC · JPL |
| 220920 | 2005 GS_{10} | — | April 1, 2005 | Kitt Peak | Spacewatch | · | 1.1 km | MPC · JPL |
| 220921 | 2005 GS_{21} | — | April 4, 2005 | Goodricke-Pigott | R. A. Tucker | · | 900 m | MPC · JPL |
| 220922 | 2005 GH_{31} | — | April 4, 2005 | Catalina | CSS | · | 1.2 km | MPC · JPL |
| 220923 | 2005 GQ_{49} | — | April 5, 2005 | Mount Lemmon | Mount Lemmon Survey | · | 1 km | MPC · JPL |
| 220924 | 2005 GO_{50} | — | April 5, 2005 | Kitt Peak | Spacewatch | · | 790 m | MPC · JPL |
| 220925 | 2005 GL_{93} | — | April 6, 2005 | Kitt Peak | Spacewatch | · | 720 m | MPC · JPL |
| 220926 | 2005 GN_{94} | — | April 6, 2005 | Kitt Peak | Spacewatch | · | 1.2 km | MPC · JPL |
| 220927 | 2005 GL_{148} | — | April 11, 2005 | Anderson Mesa | LONEOS | · | 790 m | MPC · JPL |
| 220928 | 2005 GY_{163} | — | April 10, 2005 | Mount Lemmon | Mount Lemmon Survey | · | 1.1 km | MPC · JPL |
| 220929 | 2005 GE_{220} | — | April 4, 2005 | Catalina | CSS | · | 790 m | MPC · JPL |
| 220930 | 2005 GW_{223} | — | April 1, 2005 | Kitt Peak | Spacewatch | · | 960 m | MPC · JPL |
| 220931 | 2005 HM | — | April 16, 2005 | Kitt Peak | Spacewatch | · | 840 m | MPC · JPL |
| 220932 | 2005 HN_{4} | — | April 27, 2005 | Campo Imperatore | CINEOS | (159) | 5.1 km | MPC · JPL |
| 220933 | 2005 HJ_{6} | — | April 30, 2005 | Kitt Peak | Spacewatch | · | 1.2 km | MPC · JPL |
| 220934 | 2005 JO_{17} | — | May 4, 2005 | Kitt Peak | Spacewatch | ERI | 1.8 km | MPC · JPL |
| 220935 | 2005 JM_{68} | — | May 6, 2005 | Catalina | CSS | · | 970 m | MPC · JPL |
| 220936 | 2005 JQ_{69} | — | May 7, 2005 | Kitt Peak | Spacewatch | · | 920 m | MPC · JPL |
| 220937 | 2005 JA_{76} | — | May 9, 2005 | Mount Lemmon | Mount Lemmon Survey | MAS | 890 m | MPC · JPL |
| 220938 | 2005 JA_{88} | — | May 10, 2005 | Kitt Peak | Spacewatch | · | 960 m | MPC · JPL |
| 220939 | 2005 JO_{92} | — | May 11, 2005 | Palomar | NEAT | · | 1.2 km | MPC · JPL |
| 220940 | 2005 JG_{99} | — | May 9, 2005 | Socorro | LINEAR | · | 1.3 km | MPC · JPL |
| 220941 | 2005 JZ_{105} | — | May 11, 2005 | Mount Lemmon | Mount Lemmon Survey | · | 960 m | MPC · JPL |
| 220942 | 2005 JB_{112} | — | May 9, 2005 | Mount Lemmon | Mount Lemmon Survey | · | 750 m | MPC · JPL |
| 220943 | 2005 JE_{135} | — | May 14, 2005 | Mount Lemmon | Mount Lemmon Survey | · | 1.5 km | MPC · JPL |
| 220944 | 2005 JG_{149} | — | May 3, 2005 | Kitt Peak | Spacewatch | · | 1.4 km | MPC · JPL |
| 220945 | 2005 JP_{151} | — | May 4, 2005 | Kitt Peak | Spacewatch | · | 750 m | MPC · JPL |
| 220946 | 2005 JY_{153} | — | May 4, 2005 | Kitt Peak | Spacewatch | · | 950 m | MPC · JPL |
| 220947 | 2005 JA_{161} | — | May 8, 2005 | Kitt Peak | Spacewatch | · | 1.0 km | MPC · JPL |
| 220948 | 2005 KU_{2} | — | May 16, 2005 | Mount Lemmon | Mount Lemmon Survey | V | 750 m | MPC · JPL |
| 220949 | 2005 KD_{10} | — | May 31, 2005 | Mayhill | Lowe, A. | · | 1.1 km | MPC · JPL |
| 220950 | 2005 KU_{10} | — | May 31, 2005 | Anderson Mesa | LONEOS | · | 1.1 km | MPC · JPL |
| 220951 | 2005 LT_{17} | — | June 6, 2005 | Kitt Peak | Spacewatch | L4 | 10 km | MPC · JPL |
| 220952 | 2005 LJ_{19} | — | June 8, 2005 | Kitt Peak | Spacewatch | · | 1.1 km | MPC · JPL |
| 220953 | 2005 LH_{26} | — | June 8, 2005 | Kitt Peak | Spacewatch | · | 870 m | MPC · JPL |
| 220954 | 2005 LD_{30} | — | June 12, 2005 | Kitt Peak | Spacewatch | NYS | 1.5 km | MPC · JPL |
| 220955 | 2005 LO_{48} | — | June 13, 2005 | Mount Lemmon | Mount Lemmon Survey | MAS | 1.0 km | MPC · JPL |
| 220956 | 2005 LR_{48} | — | June 15, 2005 | Mount Lemmon | Mount Lemmon Survey | · | 2.4 km | MPC · JPL |
| 220957 | 2005 MD_{2} | — | June 16, 2005 | Mount Lemmon | Mount Lemmon Survey | · | 1.4 km | MPC · JPL |
| 220958 | 2005 MF_{8} | — | June 27, 2005 | Kitt Peak | Spacewatch | MAS | 910 m | MPC · JPL |
| 220959 | 2005 ME_{12} | — | June 28, 2005 | Palomar | NEAT | NYS | 1.5 km | MPC · JPL |
| 220960 | 2005 MC_{15} | — | June 29, 2005 | Palomar | NEAT | · | 2.1 km | MPC · JPL |
| 220961 | 2005 MN_{18} | — | June 28, 2005 | Palomar | NEAT | · | 1.7 km | MPC · JPL |
| 220962 | 2005 ML_{25} | — | June 27, 2005 | Kitt Peak | Spacewatch | NYS | 1.7 km | MPC · JPL |
| 220963 | 2005 MR_{25} | — | June 27, 2005 | Kitt Peak | Spacewatch | NYS | 1.4 km | MPC · JPL |
| 220964 | 2005 MY_{27} | — | June 29, 2005 | Kitt Peak | Spacewatch | · | 2.0 km | MPC · JPL |
| 220965 | 2005 MX_{28} | — | June 29, 2005 | Kitt Peak | Spacewatch | · | 1.0 km | MPC · JPL |
| 220966 | 2005 MG_{32} | — | June 28, 2005 | Palomar | NEAT | · | 1.5 km | MPC · JPL |
| 220967 | 2005 ME_{33} | — | June 29, 2005 | Kitt Peak | Spacewatch | · | 1.6 km | MPC · JPL |
| 220968 | 2005 MT_{39} | — | June 29, 2005 | Palomar | NEAT | · | 1.5 km | MPC · JPL |
| 220969 | 2005 MG_{43} | — | June 21, 2005 | Palomar | NEAT | · | 2.2 km | MPC · JPL |
| 220970 | 2005 MS_{45} | — | June 27, 2005 | Kitt Peak | Spacewatch | · | 1.5 km | MPC · JPL |
| 220971 | 2005 MX_{45} | — | June 27, 2005 | Palomar | NEAT | · | 1.7 km | MPC · JPL |
| 220972 | 2005 MJ_{53} | — | June 17, 2005 | Mount Lemmon | Mount Lemmon Survey | · | 1.9 km | MPC · JPL |
| 220973 | 2005 MN_{53} | — | June 17, 2005 | Mount Lemmon | Mount Lemmon Survey | · | 1.4 km | MPC · JPL |
| 220974 | 2005 MR_{53} | — | June 17, 2005 | Mount Lemmon | Mount Lemmon Survey | NYS | 1.5 km | MPC · JPL |
| 220975 | 2005 NA_{2} | — | July 2, 2005 | Kitt Peak | Spacewatch | · | 1.2 km | MPC · JPL |
| 220976 | 2005 ND_{2} | — | July 2, 2005 | Kitt Peak | Spacewatch | · | 1.4 km | MPC · JPL |
| 220977 | 2005 NC_{6} | — | July 4, 2005 | Kitt Peak | Spacewatch | · | 1.6 km | MPC · JPL |
| 220978 | 2005 NL_{9} | — | July 1, 2005 | Kitt Peak | Spacewatch | · | 1.9 km | MPC · JPL |
| 220979 | 2005 NS_{9} | — | July 1, 2005 | Kitt Peak | Spacewatch | NYS | 1.5 km | MPC · JPL |
| 220980 | 2005 NY_{9} | — | July 2, 2005 | Catalina | CSS | · | 1.8 km | MPC · JPL |
| 220981 | 2005 NE_{11} | — | July 3, 2005 | Mount Lemmon | Mount Lemmon Survey | MAS | 1.1 km | MPC · JPL |
| 220982 | 2005 NR_{11} | — | July 4, 2005 | Palomar | NEAT | · | 1.6 km | MPC · JPL |
| 220983 | 2005 NZ_{14} | — | July 4, 2005 | Kitt Peak | Spacewatch | · | 1.3 km | MPC · JPL |
| 220984 | 2005 NT_{15} | — | July 2, 2005 | Kitt Peak | Spacewatch | MAS | 1.3 km | MPC · JPL |
| 220985 | 2005 NU_{28} | — | July 5, 2005 | Palomar | NEAT | V | 760 m | MPC · JPL |
| 220986 | 2005 ND_{29} | — | July 5, 2005 | Palomar | NEAT | · | 1.8 km | MPC · JPL |
| 220987 | 2005 NZ_{29} | — | July 4, 2005 | Kitt Peak | Spacewatch | MAS | 1.0 km | MPC · JPL |
| 220988 | 2005 NE_{32} | — | July 5, 2005 | Kitt Peak | Spacewatch | · | 1.7 km | MPC · JPL |
| 220989 | 2005 NF_{34} | — | July 5, 2005 | Kitt Peak | Spacewatch | · | 1.1 km | MPC · JPL |
| 220990 | 2005 NQ_{34} | — | July 5, 2005 | Kitt Peak | Spacewatch | · | 1.3 km | MPC · JPL |
| 220991 | 2005 NL_{42} | — | July 5, 2005 | Kitt Peak | Spacewatch | · | 950 m | MPC · JPL |
| 220992 | 2005 NZ_{48} | — | July 4, 2005 | Siding Spring | SSS | V | 1.1 km | MPC · JPL |
| 220993 | 2005 ND_{49} | — | July 6, 2005 | Siding Spring | SSS | · | 2.2 km | MPC · JPL |
| 220994 | 2005 NK_{51} | — | July 8, 2005 | Kitt Peak | Spacewatch | · | 1.6 km | MPC · JPL |
| 220995 | 2005 NP_{53} | — | July 10, 2005 | Kitt Peak | Spacewatch | NYS | 1.4 km | MPC · JPL |
| 220996 | 2005 NN_{61} | — | July 11, 2005 | Kitt Peak | Spacewatch | · | 1.2 km | MPC · JPL |
| 220997 | 2005 NS_{65} | — | July 1, 2005 | Kitt Peak | Spacewatch | NYS | 1.6 km | MPC · JPL |
| 220998 | 2005 ND_{70} | — | July 4, 2005 | Palomar | NEAT | NYS | 1.5 km | MPC · JPL |
| 220999 | 2005 NE_{73} | — | July 9, 2005 | Catalina | CSS | · | 2.0 km | MPC · JPL |
| 221000 | 2005 NH_{75} | — | July 10, 2005 | Kitt Peak | Spacewatch | NYS | 1.3 km | MPC · JPL |

back to top

== See also ==
- Meanings of minor-planet names: 220001–221000
