= List of minor planets: 219001–220000 =

The following is a partial list of minor planets, running from minor-planet number 219001 through 220000, inclusive. The primary data for this and other partial lists is based on JPL's "Small-Body Orbital Elements" and data available from the Minor Planet Center. Critical list information is also provided by the MPC, unless otherwise specified from Lowell Observatory. A detailed description of the table's columns and additional sources are given on the main page including a complete list of every page in this series, and a statistical break-up on the dynamical classification of minor planets.

Also see the summary list of all named bodies in numerical and alphabetical order, and the corresponding naming citations for the number range of this particular list. New namings may only be added to this list after official publication, as the preannouncement of names is condemned by the Working Group for Small Bodies Nomenclature of the International Astronomical Union.

| Near-Earth obj. | MBA (inner) | MBA (outer) | Centaur |
| Mars-crosser | MBA (middle) | Jupiter trojan | Trans-Neptunian obj. |
| Unclassified |

== 219001–219100 ==
| Designation | | | Discovery | | | Properties | | Ref |
| Permanent | Provisional | Named after | Date | Site | Discoverer(s) | Category | Diam. | Ref |
|---|---|---|---|---|---|---|---|---|
| 219001 | 2008 JX_{20} | — | May 9, 2008 | Grove Creek | Tozzi, F. | · | 2.8 km | MPC · JPL |
| 219002 | 2008 JE_{39} | — | May 3, 2008 | Kitt Peak | Spacewatch | · | 2.4 km | MPC · JPL |
| 219003 | 2008 KR_{11} | — | May 27, 2008 | Calvin-Rehoboth | Calvin College | · | 3.5 km | MPC · JPL |
| 219004 | 2008 SR_{50} | — | September 20, 2008 | Mount Lemmon | Mount Lemmon Survey | · | 3.4 km | MPC · JPL |
| 219005 | 2008 TM_{81} | — | October 2, 2008 | Mount Lemmon | Mount Lemmon Survey | · | 4.0 km | MPC · JPL |
| 219006 | 2008 TD_{111} | — | October 6, 2008 | Catalina | CSS | EUN | 1.7 km | MPC · JPL |
| 219007 | 2008 YX | — | December 19, 2008 | Bisei SG Center | BATTeRS | · | 2.8 km | MPC · JPL |
| 219008 Igazantal | 2008 YY_{8} | Igazantal | December 23, 2008 | Piszkéstető | K. Sárneczky | · | 4.4 km | MPC · JPL |
| 219009 | 2009 HP_{72} | — | April 27, 2009 | Catalina | CSS | V | 990 m | MPC · JPL |
| 219010 | 2009 MJ_{8} | — | June 28, 2009 | La Sagra | OAM | · | 1.6 km | MPC · JPL |
| 219011 | 2734 P-L | — | September 24, 1960 | Palomar | C. J. van Houten, I. van Houten-Groeneveld, T. Gehrels | THM | 2.7 km | MPC · JPL |
| 219012 | 4762 P-L | — | September 24, 1960 | Palomar | C. J. van Houten, I. van Houten-Groeneveld, T. Gehrels | EOS | 3.5 km | MPC · JPL |
| 219013 | 6253 P-L | — | September 24, 1960 | Palomar | C. J. van Houten, I. van Houten-Groeneveld, T. Gehrels | NEM | 3.0 km | MPC · JPL |
| 219014 | 6768 P-L | — | September 24, 1960 | Palomar | C. J. van Houten, I. van Houten-Groeneveld, T. Gehrels | NYS | 930 m | MPC · JPL |
| 219015 | 1531 T-2 | — | September 29, 1973 | Palomar | C. J. van Houten, I. van Houten-Groeneveld, T. Gehrels | · | 680 m | MPC · JPL |
| 219016 | 3191 T-2 | — | September 30, 1973 | Palomar | C. J. van Houten, I. van Houten-Groeneveld, T. Gehrels | · | 1.5 km | MPC · JPL |
| 219017 | 3156 T-3 | — | October 16, 1977 | Palomar | C. J. van Houten, I. van Houten-Groeneveld, T. Gehrels | · | 1.4 km | MPC · JPL |
| 219018 | 4219 T-3 | — | October 16, 1977 | Palomar | C. J. van Houten, I. van Houten-Groeneveld, T. Gehrels | · | 1.3 km | MPC · JPL |
| 219019 | 1981 EP_{8} | — | March 1, 1981 | Siding Spring | S. J. Bus | · | 3.0 km | MPC · JPL |
| 219020 | 1981 EH_{32} | — | March 6, 1981 | Siding Spring | S. J. Bus | · | 3.8 km | MPC · JPL |
| 219021 | 1991 LH | — | June 14, 1991 | Kitt Peak | Spacewatch | APO +1km | 1.5 km | MPC · JPL |
| 219022 | 1993 FP_{75} | — | March 21, 1993 | La Silla | UESAC | DOR | 3.2 km | MPC · JPL |
| 219023 | 1993 RP_{14} | — | September 15, 1993 | La Silla | E. W. Elst | · | 3.4 km | MPC · JPL |
| 219024 | 1993 TK_{20} | — | October 9, 1993 | La Silla | E. W. Elst | · | 4.4 km | MPC · JPL |
| 219025 | 1993 TV_{30} | — | October 9, 1993 | La Silla | E. W. Elst | · | 3.8 km | MPC · JPL |
| 219026 | 1994 GA_{2} | — | April 3, 1994 | Kitt Peak | Spacewatch | · | 2.6 km | MPC · JPL |
| 219027 | 1994 GD_{11} | — | April 6, 1994 | Kitt Peak | Spacewatch | · | 2.1 km | MPC · JPL |
| 219028 | 1994 KE | — | May 17, 1994 | Kitt Peak | Spacewatch | · | 1.1 km | MPC · JPL |
| 219029 | 1994 RT_{4} | — | September 5, 1994 | Kitt Peak | Spacewatch | · | 1.6 km | MPC · JPL |
| 219030 | 1994 TR_{14} | — | October 13, 1994 | Kitt Peak | Spacewatch | · | 2.2 km | MPC · JPL |
| 219031 | 1994 WZ_{6} | — | November 28, 1994 | Kitt Peak | Spacewatch | · | 2.7 km | MPC · JPL |
| 219032 | 1995 EM_{3} | — | March 2, 1995 | Kitt Peak | Spacewatch | · | 750 m | MPC · JPL |
| 219033 | 1995 FQ_{1} | — | March 23, 1995 | Kitt Peak | Spacewatch | · | 4.6 km | MPC · JPL |
| 219034 | 1995 FZ_{1} | — | March 23, 1995 | Kitt Peak | Spacewatch | THM | 3.0 km | MPC · JPL |
| 219035 | 1995 FA_{14} | — | March 27, 1995 | Kitt Peak | Spacewatch | · | 1.5 km | MPC · JPL |
| 219036 | 1995 GM_{6} | — | April 6, 1995 | Kitt Peak | Spacewatch | · | 3.2 km | MPC · JPL |
| 219037 | 1995 OU_{8} | — | July 27, 1995 | Kitt Peak | Spacewatch | · | 2.4 km | MPC · JPL |
| 219038 | 1995 SK | — | September 17, 1995 | Ondřejov | L. Kotková | PHO | 1.6 km | MPC · JPL |
| 219039 | 1995 ST_{19} | — | September 18, 1995 | Kitt Peak | Spacewatch | · | 1.3 km | MPC · JPL |
| 219040 | 1995 ST_{34} | — | September 22, 1995 | Kitt Peak | Spacewatch | AST | 2.0 km | MPC · JPL |
| 219041 | 1995 SZ_{40} | — | September 25, 1995 | Kitt Peak | Spacewatch | · | 2.4 km | MPC · JPL |
| 219042 | 1995 SZ_{50} | — | September 26, 1995 | Kitt Peak | Spacewatch | · | 2.9 km | MPC · JPL |
| 219043 | 1995 SW_{62} | — | September 25, 1995 | Kitt Peak | Spacewatch | NYS | 900 m | MPC · JPL |
| 219044 | 1995 SW_{79} | — | September 21, 1995 | Kitt Peak | Spacewatch | MRX | 1.4 km | MPC · JPL |
| 219045 | 1995 UG_{11} | — | October 17, 1995 | Kitt Peak | Spacewatch | · | 3.6 km | MPC · JPL |
| 219046 | 1995 UL_{57} | — | October 16, 1995 | Kitt Peak | Spacewatch | · | 1.1 km | MPC · JPL |
| 219047 | 1995 UO_{57} | — | October 16, 1995 | Kitt Peak | Spacewatch | · | 910 m | MPC · JPL |
| 219048 | 1995 VO_{4} | — | November 14, 1995 | Kitt Peak | Spacewatch | · | 920 m | MPC · JPL |
| 219049 | 1995 VX_{10} | — | November 15, 1995 | Kitt Peak | Spacewatch | · | 1.1 km | MPC · JPL |
| 219050 | 1995 WB_{20} | — | November 17, 1995 | Kitt Peak | Spacewatch | · | 1.5 km | MPC · JPL |
| 219051 | 1995 WG_{26} | — | November 18, 1995 | Kitt Peak | Spacewatch | · | 1.5 km | MPC · JPL |
| 219052 | 1995 XW_{4} | — | December 14, 1995 | Kitt Peak | Spacewatch | · | 3.2 km | MPC · JPL |
| 219053 | 1996 BE_{8} | — | January 19, 1996 | Kitt Peak | Spacewatch | · | 1.8 km | MPC · JPL |
| 219054 | 1996 BR_{10} | — | January 24, 1996 | Kitt Peak | Spacewatch | EOS | 3.1 km | MPC · JPL |
| 219055 | 1996 BJ_{12} | — | January 24, 1996 | Kitt Peak | Spacewatch | · | 4.0 km | MPC · JPL |
| 219056 | 1996 EM_{15} | — | March 12, 1996 | Kitt Peak | Spacewatch | · | 1.5 km | MPC · JPL |
| 219057 | 1996 RA_{30} | — | September 12, 1996 | La Silla | Uppsala-DLR Trojan Survey | L4 | 17 km | MPC · JPL |
| 219058 | 1996 TJ_{20} | — | October 5, 1996 | Kitt Peak | Spacewatch | · | 970 m | MPC · JPL |
| 219059 | 1996 TD_{34} | — | October 10, 1996 | Kitt Peak | Spacewatch | · | 2.1 km | MPC · JPL |
| 219060 | 1996 TL_{35} | — | October 11, 1996 | Kitt Peak | Spacewatch | · | 2.3 km | MPC · JPL |
| 219061 | 1996 TL_{53} | — | October 5, 1996 | La Silla | E. W. Elst | · | 4.1 km | MPC · JPL |
| 219062 | 1996 VC_{13} | — | November 5, 1996 | Kitt Peak | Spacewatch | · | 1.9 km | MPC · JPL |
| 219063 | 1996 XU_{29} | — | December 14, 1996 | Kitt Peak | Spacewatch | · | 1.9 km | MPC · JPL |
| 219064 | 1997 CP_{25} | — | February 13, 1997 | Kitt Peak | Spacewatch | · | 1.2 km | MPC · JPL |
| 219065 | 1997 EC_{20} | — | March 3, 1997 | Kitt Peak | Spacewatch | KOR | 1.9 km | MPC · JPL |
| 219066 | 1997 EQ_{44} | — | March 11, 1997 | Socorro | LINEAR | · | 1.4 km | MPC · JPL |
| 219067 Bossuet | 1997 JB_{18} | Bossuet | May 3, 1997 | La Silla | E. W. Elst | · | 1.6 km | MPC · JPL |
| 219068 | 1997 TG_{9} | — | October 2, 1997 | Kitt Peak | Spacewatch | EUN | 1.5 km | MPC · JPL |
| 219069 | 1997 TW_{13} | — | October 3, 1997 | Kitt Peak | Spacewatch | · | 1.6 km | MPC · JPL |
| 219070 | 1997 TL_{20} | — | October 3, 1997 | Kitt Peak | Spacewatch | L4 | 10 km | MPC · JPL |
| 219071 | 1997 US_{9} | — | October 30, 1997 | Socorro | LINEAR | APO +1km | 660 m | MPC · JPL |
| 219072 | 1997 YW_{9} | — | December 29, 1997 | Haleakala | NEAT | · | 1.7 km | MPC · JPL |
| 219073 | 1997 YR_{15} | — | December 29, 1997 | Kitt Peak | Spacewatch | · | 2.1 km | MPC · JPL |
| 219074 | 1998 BQ_{31} | — | January 26, 1998 | Kitt Peak | Spacewatch | · | 2.1 km | MPC · JPL |
| 219075 | 1998 BR_{34} | — | January 23, 1998 | Kitt Peak | Spacewatch | · | 2.0 km | MPC · JPL |
| 219076 | 1998 DG_{23} | — | February 24, 1998 | Kitt Peak | Spacewatch | · | 2.1 km | MPC · JPL |
| 219077 | 1998 FC_{88} | — | March 24, 1998 | Socorro | LINEAR | · | 5.9 km | MPC · JPL |
| 219078 | 1998 GX | — | April 3, 1998 | Teide | Teide | · | 2.5 km | MPC · JPL |
| 219079 | 1998 HE_{14} | — | April 17, 1998 | Kitt Peak | Spacewatch | GEF | 1.8 km | MPC · JPL |
| 219080 | 1998 KF_{5} | — | May 18, 1998 | Kitt Peak | Spacewatch | · | 830 m | MPC · JPL |
| 219081 | 1998 OT_{9} | — | July 26, 1998 | La Silla | E. W. Elst | · | 1.6 km | MPC · JPL |
| 219082 | 1998 QO_{47} | — | August 17, 1998 | Socorro | LINEAR | · | 3.6 km | MPC · JPL |
| 219083 | 1998 QU_{57} | — | August 30, 1998 | Kitt Peak | Spacewatch | EOS | 2.1 km | MPC · JPL |
| 219084 | 1998 QK_{59} | — | August 26, 1998 | Kitt Peak | Spacewatch | MAS | 1.2 km | MPC · JPL |
| 219085 | 1998 QT_{77} | — | August 24, 1998 | Socorro | LINEAR | · | 5.8 km | MPC · JPL |
| 219086 | 1998 QZ_{83} | — | August 24, 1998 | Socorro | LINEAR | AEG | 6.4 km | MPC · JPL |
| 219087 | 1998 QT_{86} | — | August 24, 1998 | Socorro | LINEAR | · | 6.6 km | MPC · JPL |
| 219088 | 1998 QV_{103} | — | August 26, 1998 | La Silla | E. W. Elst | · | 6.5 km | MPC · JPL |
| 219089 | 1998 QF_{110} | — | August 23, 1998 | Socorro | LINEAR | · | 1.6 km | MPC · JPL |
| 219090 | 1998 RA | — | September 1, 1998 | Modra | Galád, A., Tóth | · | 4.2 km | MPC · JPL |
| 219091 | 1998 RF_{3} | — | September 15, 1998 | Sormano | P. Sicoli, A. Testa | · | 1.7 km | MPC · JPL |
| 219092 | 1998 RN_{21} | — | September 15, 1998 | Kitt Peak | Spacewatch | THM | 2.9 km | MPC · JPL |
| 219093 | 1998 RK_{74} | — | September 14, 1998 | Socorro | LINEAR | · | 2.2 km | MPC · JPL |
| 219094 | 1998 RN_{79} | — | September 14, 1998 | Socorro | LINEAR | VER | 5.3 km | MPC · JPL |
| 219095 | 1998 SB | — | September 16, 1998 | Caussols | ODAS | T_{j} (2.97) | 5.2 km | MPC · JPL |
| 219096 | 1998 SE_{2} | — | September 18, 1998 | Catalina | CSS | · | 2.4 km | MPC · JPL |
| 219097 | 1998 SZ_{3} | — | September 18, 1998 | Caussols | ODAS | NYS | 1.5 km | MPC · JPL |
| 219098 | 1998 SK_{5} | — | September 16, 1998 | Kitt Peak | Spacewatch | · | 5.0 km | MPC · JPL |
| 219099 | 1998 SP_{8} | — | September 20, 1998 | Kitt Peak | Spacewatch | · | 1.5 km | MPC · JPL |
| 219100 | 1998 SZ_{8} | — | September 20, 1998 | Kitt Peak | Spacewatch | · | 6.0 km | MPC · JPL |

== 219101–219200 ==
back to top

| Designation | | | Discovery | | | Properties | | Ref |
| Permanent | Provisional | Named after | Date | Site | Discoverer(s) | Category | Diam. | Ref |
|---|---|---|---|---|---|---|---|---|
| 219101 | 1998 SH_{24} | — | September 17, 1998 | Anderson Mesa | LONEOS | NYS | 1.5 km | MPC · JPL |
| 219102 | 1998 SQ_{26} | — | September 24, 1998 | Kleť | Kleť | · | 2.2 km | MPC · JPL |
| 219103 | 1998 SF_{41} | — | September 25, 1998 | Kitt Peak | Spacewatch | · | 3.1 km | MPC · JPL |
| 219104 | 1998 SN_{41} | — | September 25, 1998 | Kitt Peak | Spacewatch | · | 4.5 km | MPC · JPL |
| 219105 | 1998 SE_{42} | — | September 27, 1998 | Kitt Peak | Spacewatch | · | 3.1 km | MPC · JPL |
| 219106 | 1998 SN_{46} | — | September 25, 1998 | Kitt Peak | Spacewatch | · | 3.4 km | MPC · JPL |
| 219107 | 1998 SH_{47} | — | September 26, 1998 | Kitt Peak | Spacewatch | · | 3.1 km | MPC · JPL |
| 219108 | 1998 SY_{47} | — | September 26, 1998 | Kitt Peak | Spacewatch | · | 3.6 km | MPC · JPL |
| 219109 | 1998 SQ_{67} | — | September 20, 1998 | La Silla | E. W. Elst | · | 3.0 km | MPC · JPL |
| 219110 | 1998 SV_{70} | — | September 21, 1998 | La Silla | E. W. Elst | · | 1.8 km | MPC · JPL |
| 219111 | 1998 SP_{73} | — | September 21, 1998 | La Silla | E. W. Elst | slow | 3.7 km | MPC · JPL |
| 219112 | 1998 SW_{77} | — | September 26, 1998 | Socorro | LINEAR | · | 2.1 km | MPC · JPL |
| 219113 | 1998 SF_{85} | — | September 26, 1998 | Socorro | LINEAR | · | 4.6 km | MPC · JPL |
| 219114 | 1998 SM_{86} | — | September 26, 1998 | Socorro | LINEAR | NYS | 1.3 km | MPC · JPL |
| 219115 | 1998 SU_{102} | — | September 26, 1998 | Socorro | LINEAR | · | 4.0 km | MPC · JPL |
| 219116 | 1998 SA_{105} | — | September 26, 1998 | Socorro | LINEAR | · | 3.8 km | MPC · JPL |
| 219117 | 1998 SB_{111} | — | September 26, 1998 | Socorro | LINEAR | · | 5.3 km | MPC · JPL |
| 219118 | 1998 SB_{112} | — | September 26, 1998 | Socorro | LINEAR | EOS | 3.1 km | MPC · JPL |
| 219119 | 1998 SO_{120} | — | September 26, 1998 | Socorro | LINEAR | HYG | 3.7 km | MPC · JPL |
| 219120 | 1998 SR_{120} | — | September 26, 1998 | Socorro | LINEAR | · | 1.8 km | MPC · JPL |
| 219121 | 1998 SB_{155} | — | September 26, 1998 | Socorro | LINEAR | · | 2.0 km | MPC · JPL |
| 219122 | 1998 TR_{7} | — | October 13, 1998 | Kitt Peak | Spacewatch | · | 3.6 km | MPC · JPL |
| 219123 | 1998 TX_{15} | — | October 15, 1998 | Caussols | ODAS | · | 1.8 km | MPC · JPL |
| 219124 | 1998 TS_{27} | — | October 15, 1998 | Kitt Peak | Spacewatch | · | 3.7 km | MPC · JPL |
| 219125 | 1998 US_{11} | — | October 17, 1998 | Kitt Peak | Spacewatch | L4 | 10 km | MPC · JPL |
| 219126 | 1998 UF_{16} | — | October 23, 1998 | Caussols | ODAS | · | 1.5 km | MPC · JPL |
| 219127 | 1998 UQ_{19} | — | October 28, 1998 | Socorro | LINEAR | · | 4.5 km | MPC · JPL |
| 219128 | 1998 UW_{22} | — | October 25, 1998 | Cima Ekar | Cima Ekar | · | 3.3 km | MPC · JPL |
| 219129 | 1998 UK_{31} | — | October 20, 1998 | Xinglong | SCAP | · | 1.7 km | MPC · JPL |
| 219130 | 1998 UH_{39} | — | October 28, 1998 | Socorro | LINEAR | · | 5.4 km | MPC · JPL |
| 219131 | 1998 UY_{41} | — | October 28, 1998 | Socorro | LINEAR | · | 4.7 km | MPC · JPL |
| 219132 | 1998 VP_{6} | — | November 11, 1998 | Nachi-Katsuura | Y. Shimizu, T. Urata | · | 2.5 km | MPC · JPL |
| 219133 | 1998 VU_{25} | — | November 10, 1998 | Socorro | LINEAR | · | 6.6 km | MPC · JPL |
| 219134 | 1998 VG_{41} | — | November 14, 1998 | Kitt Peak | Spacewatch | · | 3.8 km | MPC · JPL |
| 219135 | 1998 VL_{42} | — | November 15, 1998 | Kitt Peak | Spacewatch | NYS | 1.7 km | MPC · JPL |
| 219136 | 1998 VC_{47} | — | November 14, 1998 | Kitt Peak | Spacewatch | MAS | 1.0 km | MPC · JPL |
| 219137 | 1998 WO_{8} | — | November 21, 1998 | Bergisch Gladbach | W. Bickel | NYS | 1.7 km | MPC · JPL |
| 219138 | 1998 WW_{14} | — | November 21, 1998 | Socorro | LINEAR | · | 7.2 km | MPC · JPL |
| 219139 | 1998 WM_{24} | — | November 18, 1998 | Kitt Peak | M. W. Buie | L4 | 10 km | MPC · JPL |
| 219140 | 1998 WO_{39} | — | November 22, 1998 | Kitt Peak | Spacewatch | L4 | 10 km | MPC · JPL |
| 219141 | 1998 XZ_{6} | — | December 8, 1998 | Kitt Peak | Spacewatch | L4 | 16 km | MPC · JPL |
| 219142 | 1998 XP_{14} | — | December 15, 1998 | Caussols | ODAS | · | 1.9 km | MPC · JPL |
| 219143 | 1998 XC_{16} | — | December 14, 1998 | Socorro | LINEAR | PHO | 1.6 km | MPC · JPL |
| 219144 | 1998 XY_{19} | — | December 10, 1998 | Kitt Peak | Spacewatch | · | 5.1 km | MPC · JPL |
| 219145 | 1999 BY_{20} | — | January 16, 1999 | Socorro | LINEAR | · | 4.0 km | MPC · JPL |
| 219146 | 1999 FL_{33} | — | March 19, 1999 | Socorro | LINEAR | · | 4.6 km | MPC · JPL |
| 219147 | 1999 HD_{4} | — | April 16, 1999 | Kitt Peak | Spacewatch | · | 2.3 km | MPC · JPL |
| 219148 | 1999 JV_{23} | — | May 10, 1999 | Socorro | LINEAR | · | 2.4 km | MPC · JPL |
| 219149 | 1999 PZ_{2} | — | August 8, 1999 | Kitt Peak | Spacewatch | · | 3.5 km | MPC · JPL |
| 219150 | 1999 RX_{7} | — | September 3, 1999 | Kitt Peak | Spacewatch | · | 1.3 km | MPC · JPL |
| 219151 | 1999 RQ_{13} | — | September 7, 1999 | Socorro | LINEAR | · | 3.6 km | MPC · JPL |
| 219152 | 1999 RA_{41} | — | September 9, 1999 | Socorro | LINEAR | PHO | 1.1 km | MPC · JPL |
| 219153 | 1999 RK_{107} | — | September 8, 1999 | Socorro | LINEAR | · | 1.1 km | MPC · JPL |
| 219154 | 1999 RZ_{119} | — | September 9, 1999 | Socorro | LINEAR | · | 1.3 km | MPC · JPL |
| 219155 | 1999 RK_{144} | — | September 9, 1999 | Socorro | LINEAR | · | 920 m | MPC · JPL |
| 219156 | 1999 RO_{145} | — | September 9, 1999 | Socorro | LINEAR | · | 1.1 km | MPC · JPL |
| 219157 | 1999 RY_{188} | — | September 9, 1999 | Socorro | LINEAR | · | 890 m | MPC · JPL |
| 219158 | 1999 RK_{209} | — | September 8, 1999 | Socorro | LINEAR | EOS | 3.6 km | MPC · JPL |
| 219159 | 1999 RL_{220} | — | September 4, 1999 | Catalina | CSS | · | 1.1 km | MPC · JPL |
| 219160 | 1999 RA_{225} | — | September 7, 1999 | Socorro | LINEAR | · | 1.3 km | MPC · JPL |
| 219161 | 1999 RR_{226} | — | September 5, 1999 | Catalina | CSS | · | 3.7 km | MPC · JPL |
| 219162 | 1999 RZ_{232} | — | September 8, 1999 | Catalina | CSS | · | 1.9 km | MPC · JPL |
| 219163 | 1999 SF_{13} | — | September 30, 1999 | Socorro | LINEAR | · | 1.1 km | MPC · JPL |
| 219164 | 1999 TA_{14} | — | October 11, 1999 | Gnosca | S. Sposetti | · | 1.5 km | MPC · JPL |
| 219165 | 1999 TV_{38} | — | October 1, 1999 | Catalina | CSS | · | 2.3 km | MPC · JPL |
| 219166 | 1999 TU_{42} | — | October 3, 1999 | Kitt Peak | Spacewatch | KOR | 1.6 km | MPC · JPL |
| 219167 | 1999 TH_{54} | — | October 6, 1999 | Kitt Peak | Spacewatch | · | 1.1 km | MPC · JPL |
| 219168 | 1999 TM_{58} | — | October 6, 1999 | Kitt Peak | Spacewatch | · | 840 m | MPC · JPL |
| 219169 | 1999 TJ_{59} | — | October 7, 1999 | Kitt Peak | Spacewatch | · | 760 m | MPC · JPL |
| 219170 | 1999 TA_{69} | — | October 9, 1999 | Kitt Peak | Spacewatch | · | 2.3 km | MPC · JPL |
| 219171 | 1999 TL_{76} | — | October 10, 1999 | Kitt Peak | Spacewatch | KOR | 1.8 km | MPC · JPL |
| 219172 | 1999 TU_{78} | — | October 11, 1999 | Kitt Peak | Spacewatch | · | 890 m | MPC · JPL |
| 219173 | 1999 TN_{120} | — | October 4, 1999 | Socorro | LINEAR | · | 3.1 km | MPC · JPL |
| 219174 | 1999 TJ_{129} | — | October 6, 1999 | Socorro | LINEAR | · | 1.1 km | MPC · JPL |
| 219175 | 1999 TP_{148} | — | October 7, 1999 | Socorro | LINEAR | · | 1.1 km | MPC · JPL |
| 219176 | 1999 TL_{165} | — | October 10, 1999 | Socorro | LINEAR | EOS | 2.6 km | MPC · JPL |
| 219177 | 1999 TO_{171} | — | October 10, 1999 | Socorro | LINEAR | · | 970 m | MPC · JPL |
| 219178 | 1999 TX_{175} | — | October 10, 1999 | Socorro | LINEAR | · | 3.5 km | MPC · JPL |
| 219179 | 1999 TL_{182} | — | October 11, 1999 | Socorro | LINEAR | · | 1.3 km | MPC · JPL |
| 219180 | 1999 TH_{187} | — | October 12, 1999 | Socorro | LINEAR | · | 3.7 km | MPC · JPL |
| 219181 | 1999 TM_{196} | — | October 12, 1999 | Socorro | LINEAR | · | 1.1 km | MPC · JPL |
| 219182 | 1999 TJ_{202} | — | October 13, 1999 | Socorro | LINEAR | · | 3.2 km | MPC · JPL |
| 219183 | 1999 TL_{207} | — | October 14, 1999 | Socorro | LINEAR | PHO | 2.5 km | MPC · JPL |
| 219184 | 1999 TX_{210} | — | October 14, 1999 | Socorro | LINEAR | · | 4.8 km | MPC · JPL |
| 219185 | 1999 TC_{212} | — | October 15, 1999 | Socorro | LINEAR | · | 2.8 km | MPC · JPL |
| 219186 | 1999 TH_{212} | — | October 15, 1999 | Socorro | LINEAR | · | 940 m | MPC · JPL |
| 219187 | 1999 TN_{218} | — | October 15, 1999 | Socorro | LINEAR | · | 850 m | MPC · JPL |
| 219188 | 1999 TM_{234} | — | October 12, 1999 | Socorro | LINEAR | PHO | 2.1 km | MPC · JPL |
| 219189 | 1999 TZ_{287} | — | October 10, 1999 | Socorro | LINEAR | · | 1.0 km | MPC · JPL |
| 219190 | 1999 TY_{300} | — | October 3, 1999 | Kitt Peak | Spacewatch | · | 1.2 km | MPC · JPL |
| 219191 | 1999 TL_{316} | — | October 10, 1999 | Kitt Peak | Spacewatch | · | 2.7 km | MPC · JPL |
| 219192 | 1999 UE_{7} | — | October 30, 1999 | Socorro | LINEAR | H | 1.1 km | MPC · JPL |
| 219193 | 1999 UO_{10} | — | October 31, 1999 | Socorro | LINEAR | PHO | 3.8 km | MPC · JPL |
| 219194 | 1999 UG_{27} | — | October 30, 1999 | Kitt Peak | Spacewatch | · | 2.2 km | MPC · JPL |
| 219195 | 1999 UT_{29} | — | October 31, 1999 | Kitt Peak | Spacewatch | · | 880 m | MPC · JPL |
| 219196 | 1999 UU_{34} | — | October 31, 1999 | Kitt Peak | Spacewatch | · | 830 m | MPC · JPL |
| 219197 | 1999 UM_{40} | — | October 16, 1999 | Socorro | LINEAR | · | 2.4 km | MPC · JPL |
| 219198 | 1999 UA_{44} | — | October 29, 1999 | Catalina | CSS | · | 3.6 km | MPC · JPL |
| 219199 | 1999 UE_{46} | — | October 31, 1999 | Catalina | CSS | · | 960 m | MPC · JPL |
| 219200 | 1999 VH_{3} | — | November 1, 1999 | Kitt Peak | Spacewatch | · | 670 m | MPC · JPL |

== 219201–219300 ==
back to top

| Designation | | | Discovery | | | Properties | | Ref |
| Permanent | Provisional | Named after | Date | Site | Discoverer(s) | Category | Diam. | Ref |
|---|---|---|---|---|---|---|---|---|
| 219201 | 1999 VE_{6} | — | November 5, 1999 | Oizumi | T. Kobayashi | · | 3.3 km | MPC · JPL |
| 219202 | 1999 VZ_{10} | — | November 7, 1999 | Gnosca | S. Sposetti | · | 980 m | MPC · JPL |
| 219203 | 1999 VA_{17} | — | November 2, 1999 | Kitt Peak | Spacewatch | · | 2.1 km | MPC · JPL |
| 219204 | 1999 VU_{30} | — | November 3, 1999 | Socorro | LINEAR | · | 8.5 km | MPC · JPL |
| 219205 | 1999 VO_{40} | — | November 15, 1999 | Ondřejov | P. Pravec, P. Kušnirák | · | 1.4 km | MPC · JPL |
| 219206 | 1999 VM_{42} | — | November 4, 1999 | Kitt Peak | Spacewatch | V | 790 m | MPC · JPL |
| 219207 | 1999 VO_{49} | — | November 3, 1999 | Socorro | LINEAR | EMA | 5.4 km | MPC · JPL |
| 219208 | 1999 VE_{51} | — | November 3, 1999 | Socorro | LINEAR | · | 1.4 km | MPC · JPL |
| 219209 | 1999 VT_{59} | — | November 4, 1999 | Socorro | LINEAR | EOS | 2.5 km | MPC · JPL |
| 219210 | 1999 VA_{63} | — | November 4, 1999 | Socorro | LINEAR | EOS | 3.1 km | MPC · JPL |
| 219211 | 1999 VS_{74} | — | November 5, 1999 | Kitt Peak | Spacewatch | · | 3.1 km | MPC · JPL |
| 219212 | 1999 VD_{76} | — | November 5, 1999 | Kitt Peak | Spacewatch | · | 1.0 km | MPC · JPL |
| 219213 | 1999 VY_{88} | — | November 4, 1999 | Socorro | LINEAR | · | 3.0 km | MPC · JPL |
| 219214 | 1999 VK_{91} | — | November 5, 1999 | Socorro | LINEAR | · | 3.8 km | MPC · JPL |
| 219215 | 1999 VJ_{101} | — | November 9, 1999 | Socorro | LINEAR | · | 3.3 km | MPC · JPL |
| 219216 | 1999 VZ_{103} | — | November 9, 1999 | Socorro | LINEAR | · | 4.4 km | MPC · JPL |
| 219217 | 1999 VE_{108} | — | November 9, 1999 | Socorro | LINEAR | EOS | 3.2 km | MPC · JPL |
| 219218 | 1999 VP_{108} | — | November 9, 1999 | Socorro | LINEAR | · | 3.3 km | MPC · JPL |
| 219219 | 1999 VB_{119} | — | November 3, 1999 | Kitt Peak | Spacewatch | TEL | 1.8 km | MPC · JPL |
| 219220 | 1999 VE_{123} | — | November 5, 1999 | Kitt Peak | Spacewatch | · | 2.4 km | MPC · JPL |
| 219221 | 1999 VF_{123} | — | November 5, 1999 | Kitt Peak | Spacewatch | · | 2.3 km | MPC · JPL |
| 219222 | 1999 VY_{133} | — | November 10, 1999 | Kitt Peak | Spacewatch | KOR | 1.9 km | MPC · JPL |
| 219223 | 1999 VS_{137} | — | November 12, 1999 | Socorro | LINEAR | · | 3.0 km | MPC · JPL |
| 219224 | 1999 VW_{137} | — | November 12, 1999 | Socorro | LINEAR | · | 3.7 km | MPC · JPL |
| 219225 | 1999 VT_{141} | — | November 10, 1999 | Kitt Peak | Spacewatch | · | 2.4 km | MPC · JPL |
| 219226 | 1999 VN_{143} | — | November 14, 1999 | Socorro | LINEAR | · | 880 m | MPC · JPL |
| 219227 | 1999 VH_{149} | — | November 14, 1999 | Socorro | LINEAR | · | 890 m | MPC · JPL |
| 219228 | 1999 VA_{157} | — | November 12, 1999 | Socorro | LINEAR | · | 960 m | MPC · JPL |
| 219229 | 1999 VC_{162} | — | November 14, 1999 | Socorro | LINEAR | · | 2.6 km | MPC · JPL |
| 219230 | 1999 VK_{162} | — | November 14, 1999 | Socorro | LINEAR | · | 1.2 km | MPC · JPL |
| 219231 | 1999 VN_{165} | — | November 14, 1999 | Socorro | LINEAR | · | 1.2 km | MPC · JPL |
| 219232 | 1999 VT_{166} | — | November 14, 1999 | Socorro | LINEAR | · | 5.0 km | MPC · JPL |
| 219233 | 1999 VN_{187} | — | November 15, 1999 | Socorro | LINEAR | · | 3.5 km | MPC · JPL |
| 219234 | 1999 VX_{191} | — | November 14, 1999 | Socorro | LINEAR | · | 2.5 km | MPC · JPL |
| 219235 | 1999 VN_{198} | — | November 3, 1999 | Catalina | CSS | · | 1.0 km | MPC · JPL |
| 219236 | 1999 VB_{207} | — | November 11, 1999 | Catalina | CSS | EOS | 3.1 km | MPC · JPL |
| 219237 | 1999 VR_{212} | — | November 12, 1999 | Socorro | LINEAR | · | 1.5 km | MPC · JPL |
| 219238 | 1999 WS_{17} | — | November 30, 1999 | Kitt Peak | Spacewatch | · | 3.4 km | MPC · JPL |
| 219239 | 1999 WB_{24} | — | November 17, 1999 | Kitt Peak | Spacewatch | · | 1.0 km | MPC · JPL |
| 219240 | 1999 XN | — | December 2, 1999 | Kitt Peak | Spacewatch | · | 2.5 km | MPC · JPL |
| 219241 | 1999 XW_{29} | — | December 6, 1999 | Socorro | LINEAR | · | 4.1 km | MPC · JPL |
| 219242 | 1999 XJ_{44} | — | December 7, 1999 | Socorro | LINEAR | · | 1.2 km | MPC · JPL |
| 219243 | 1999 XG_{53} | — | December 7, 1999 | Socorro | LINEAR | · | 1.2 km | MPC · JPL |
| 219244 | 1999 XV_{62} | — | December 7, 1999 | Socorro | LINEAR | EOS | 3.4 km | MPC · JPL |
| 219245 | 1999 XC_{70} | — | December 7, 1999 | Socorro | LINEAR | · | 920 m | MPC · JPL |
| 219246 | 1999 XL_{70} | — | December 7, 1999 | Socorro | LINEAR | · | 920 m | MPC · JPL |
| 219247 | 1999 XS_{116} | — | December 5, 1999 | Catalina | CSS | · | 3.8 km | MPC · JPL |
| 219248 | 1999 XT_{130} | — | December 12, 1999 | Socorro | LINEAR | · | 3.8 km | MPC · JPL |
| 219249 | 1999 XC_{139} | — | December 6, 1999 | Kitt Peak | Spacewatch | · | 6.0 km | MPC · JPL |
| 219250 | 1999 XQ_{161} | — | December 13, 1999 | Socorro | LINEAR | · | 840 m | MPC · JPL |
| 219251 | 1999 XS_{161} | — | December 13, 1999 | Socorro | LINEAR | · | 1.4 km | MPC · JPL |
| 219252 | 1999 XX_{183} | — | December 12, 1999 | Socorro | LINEAR | · | 1.2 km | MPC · JPL |
| 219253 | 1999 XU_{238} | — | December 5, 1999 | Catalina | CSS | · | 1.0 km | MPC · JPL |
| 219254 | 1999 XE_{259} | — | December 7, 1999 | Kitt Peak | Spacewatch | · | 4.9 km | MPC · JPL |
| 219255 | 1999 YC_{12} | — | December 27, 1999 | Kitt Peak | Spacewatch | · | 1.2 km | MPC · JPL |
| 219256 | 2000 AM_{4} | — | January 3, 2000 | Kitt Peak | Spacewatch | · | 5.5 km | MPC · JPL |
| 219257 | 2000 AN_{22} | — | January 3, 2000 | Socorro | LINEAR | · | 4.1 km | MPC · JPL |
| 219258 | 2000 AT_{42} | — | January 4, 2000 | Socorro | LINEAR | H | 730 m | MPC · JPL |
| 219259 | 2000 AS_{43} | — | January 2, 2000 | Kitt Peak | Spacewatch | · | 3.4 km | MPC · JPL |
| 219260 | 2000 AR_{88} | — | January 5, 2000 | Socorro | LINEAR | · | 1.5 km | MPC · JPL |
| 219261 | 2000 AW_{94} | — | January 4, 2000 | Socorro | LINEAR | · | 2.6 km | MPC · JPL |
| 219262 | 2000 AU_{122} | — | January 5, 2000 | Socorro | LINEAR | · | 3.2 km | MPC · JPL |
| 219263 | 2000 AH_{136} | — | January 4, 2000 | Socorro | LINEAR | EOS | 3.5 km | MPC · JPL |
| 219264 | 2000 AU_{155} | — | January 3, 2000 | Socorro | LINEAR | (5931) | 6.2 km | MPC · JPL |
| 219265 | 2000 AK_{158} | — | January 3, 2000 | Socorro | LINEAR | · | 4.0 km | MPC · JPL |
| 219266 | 2000 AC_{164} | — | January 5, 2000 | Socorro | LINEAR | · | 1.3 km | MPC · JPL |
| 219267 | 2000 AR_{175} | — | January 7, 2000 | Socorro | LINEAR | · | 7.9 km | MPC · JPL |
| 219268 | 2000 AY_{195} | — | January 8, 2000 | Socorro | LINEAR | · | 4.7 km | MPC · JPL |
| 219269 | 2000 AH_{201} | — | January 9, 2000 | Socorro | LINEAR | · | 4.4 km | MPC · JPL |
| 219270 | 2000 AL_{207} | — | January 3, 2000 | Kitt Peak | Spacewatch | NYS | 2.0 km | MPC · JPL |
| 219271 | 2000 AO_{210} | — | January 5, 2000 | Kitt Peak | Spacewatch | · | 3.4 km | MPC · JPL |
| 219272 | 2000 AU_{235} | — | January 5, 2000 | Socorro | LINEAR | · | 2.9 km | MPC · JPL |
| 219273 | 2000 AS_{244} | — | January 8, 2000 | Socorro | LINEAR | · | 2.1 km | MPC · JPL |
| 219274 | 2000 BZ_{3} | — | January 28, 2000 | Rock Finder | W. K. Y. Yeung | · | 3.8 km | MPC · JPL |
| 219275 | 2000 BL_{11} | — | January 26, 2000 | Kitt Peak | Spacewatch | · | 980 m | MPC · JPL |
| 219276 | 2000 BL_{17} | — | January 30, 2000 | Socorro | LINEAR | NYS | 1.5 km | MPC · JPL |
| 219277 | 2000 BO_{39} | — | January 27, 2000 | Kitt Peak | Spacewatch | · | 1.5 km | MPC · JPL |
| 219278 | 2000 CD_{43} | — | February 2, 2000 | Socorro | LINEAR | · | 1.6 km | MPC · JPL |
| 219279 | 2000 CX_{58} | — | February 6, 2000 | Socorro | LINEAR | H | 1.0 km | MPC · JPL |
| 219280 | 2000 CY_{67} | — | February 1, 2000 | Kitt Peak | Spacewatch | MAS | 920 m | MPC · JPL |
| 219281 | 2000 CO_{69} | — | February 1, 2000 | Kitt Peak | Spacewatch | · | 3.7 km | MPC · JPL |
| 219282 | 2000 CN_{79} | — | February 8, 2000 | Kitt Peak | Spacewatch | THM | 2.7 km | MPC · JPL |
| 219283 | 2000 CD_{92} | — | February 6, 2000 | Socorro | LINEAR | · | 3.1 km | MPC · JPL |
| 219284 | 2000 CK_{96} | — | February 11, 2000 | Kitt Peak | Spacewatch | · | 1.1 km | MPC · JPL |
| 219285 | 2000 CL_{101} | — | February 12, 2000 | Kitt Peak | Spacewatch | THM | 2.6 km | MPC · JPL |
| 219286 Helenewinters | 2000 CG_{110} | Helenewinters | February 5, 2000 | Kitt Peak | M. W. Buie | V | 910 m | MPC · JPL |
| 219287 | 2000 CG_{116} | — | February 3, 2000 | Socorro | LINEAR | · | 4.2 km | MPC · JPL |
| 219288 | 2000 CX_{117} | — | February 3, 2000 | Socorro | LINEAR | · | 1.6 km | MPC · JPL |
| 219289 | 2000 CG_{127} | — | February 3, 2000 | Socorro | LINEAR | HYG | 3.9 km | MPC · JPL |
| 219290 | 2000 CA_{137} | — | February 4, 2000 | Kitt Peak | Spacewatch | · | 1.4 km | MPC · JPL |
| 219291 | 2000 CL_{139} | — | February 3, 2000 | Kitt Peak | Spacewatch | · | 1 km | MPC · JPL |
| 219292 | 2000 DT | — | February 24, 2000 | Oizumi | T. Kobayashi | · | 2.1 km | MPC · JPL |
| 219293 | 2000 DR_{28} | — | February 29, 2000 | Socorro | LINEAR | MAS | 1.1 km | MPC · JPL |
| 219294 | 2000 DO_{30} | — | February 29, 2000 | Socorro | LINEAR | HYG | 4.4 km | MPC · JPL |
| 219295 | 2000 DP_{30} | — | February 29, 2000 | Socorro | LINEAR | · | 1.6 km | MPC · JPL |
| 219296 | 2000 DJ_{35} | — | February 29, 2000 | Socorro | LINEAR | MAS | 1.2 km | MPC · JPL |
| 219297 | 2000 DK_{36} | — | February 29, 2000 | Socorro | LINEAR | THM | 3.0 km | MPC · JPL |
| 219298 | 2000 DT_{47} | — | February 29, 2000 | Socorro | LINEAR | · | 1.7 km | MPC · JPL |
| 219299 | 2000 DZ_{51} | — | February 29, 2000 | Socorro | LINEAR | NYS | 1.6 km | MPC · JPL |
| 219300 | 2000 DB_{61} | — | February 29, 2000 | Socorro | LINEAR | NYS | 1.7 km | MPC · JPL |

== 219301–219400 ==
back to top

| Designation | | | Discovery | | | Properties | | Ref |
| Permanent | Provisional | Named after | Date | Site | Discoverer(s) | Category | Diam. | Ref |
|---|---|---|---|---|---|---|---|---|
| 219301 | 2000 DP_{70} | — | February 29, 2000 | Socorro | LINEAR | NYS | 1.6 km | MPC · JPL |
| 219302 | 2000 DW_{79} | — | February 28, 2000 | Socorro | LINEAR | · | 1.6 km | MPC · JPL |
| 219303 | 2000 DG_{87} | — | February 29, 2000 | Socorro | LINEAR | EUP | 5.9 km | MPC · JPL |
| 219304 | 2000 DR_{95} | — | February 28, 2000 | Socorro | LINEAR | · | 2.2 km | MPC · JPL |
| 219305 | 2000 DM_{105} | — | February 29, 2000 | Socorro | LINEAR | · | 2.2 km | MPC · JPL |
| 219306 | 2000 DM_{107} | — | February 29, 2000 | Socorro | LINEAR | · | 1.5 km | MPC · JPL |
| 219307 | 2000 DN_{112} | — | February 29, 2000 | Socorro | LINEAR | · | 1.4 km | MPC · JPL |
| 219308 | 2000 EH_{2} | — | March 3, 2000 | Socorro | LINEAR | · | 3.2 km | MPC · JPL |
| 219309 | 2000 ED_{3} | — | March 3, 2000 | Socorro | LINEAR | · | 1.4 km | MPC · JPL |
| 219310 | 2000 EJ_{27} | — | March 3, 2000 | Socorro | LINEAR | · | 1.8 km | MPC · JPL |
| 219311 | 2000 EC_{53} | — | March 3, 2000 | Kitt Peak | Spacewatch | MAS | 820 m | MPC · JPL |
| 219312 | 2000 EF_{64} | — | March 10, 2000 | Socorro | LINEAR | · | 2.1 km | MPC · JPL |
| 219313 | 2000 EJ_{71} | — | March 9, 2000 | Kitt Peak | Spacewatch | · | 4.2 km | MPC · JPL |
| 219314 | 2000 EO_{115} | — | March 10, 2000 | Kitt Peak | Spacewatch | · | 1.2 km | MPC · JPL |
| 219315 | 2000 ET_{118} | — | March 11, 2000 | Anderson Mesa | LONEOS | · | 4.5 km | MPC · JPL |
| 219316 | 2000 EH_{194} | — | March 3, 2000 | Socorro | LINEAR | HYG | 4.7 km | MPC · JPL |
| 219317 | 2000 FZ_{7} | — | March 30, 2000 | Prescott | P. G. Comba | · | 1.5 km | MPC · JPL |
| 219318 | 2000 FB_{9} | — | March 29, 2000 | Kitt Peak | Spacewatch | MAS | 850 m | MPC · JPL |
| 219319 | 2000 FH_{10} | — | March 25, 2000 | Kitt Peak | Spacewatch | · | 650 m | MPC · JPL |
| 219320 | 2000 FT_{26} | — | March 27, 2000 | Anderson Mesa | LONEOS | NYS | 1.7 km | MPC · JPL |
| 219321 | 2000 FA_{28} | — | March 27, 2000 | Anderson Mesa | LONEOS | NYS | 1.7 km | MPC · JPL |
| 219322 | 2000 FF_{74} | — | March 30, 2000 | Kitt Peak | Spacewatch | MAS | 890 m | MPC · JPL |
| 219323 | 2000 GC | — | April 1, 2000 | Kitt Peak | Spacewatch | (194) | 1.4 km | MPC · JPL |
| 219324 | 2000 GT_{154} | — | April 6, 2000 | Anderson Mesa | LONEOS | · | 1.6 km | MPC · JPL |
| 219325 | 2000 HR_{8} | — | April 27, 2000 | Socorro | LINEAR | · | 2.9 km | MPC · JPL |
| 219326 | 2000 HP_{68} | — | April 28, 2000 | Kitt Peak | Spacewatch | · | 2.1 km | MPC · JPL |
| 219327 | 2000 HY_{78} | — | April 28, 2000 | Anderson Mesa | LONEOS | · | 2.4 km | MPC · JPL |
| 219328 | 2000 JR_{22} | — | May 6, 2000 | Socorro | LINEAR | NYS | 2.0 km | MPC · JPL |
| 219329 | 2000 JR_{25} | — | May 7, 2000 | Socorro | LINEAR | · | 1.8 km | MPC · JPL |
| 219330 | 2000 KO_{1} | — | May 26, 2000 | Socorro | LINEAR | · | 2.9 km | MPC · JPL |
| 219331 | 2000 KA_{44} | — | May 26, 2000 | Kitt Peak | Spacewatch | NYS | 1.6 km | MPC · JPL |
| 219332 | 2000 LA_{3} | — | June 4, 2000 | Socorro | LINEAR | · | 3.0 km | MPC · JPL |
| 219333 | 2000 NP_{29} | — | July 7, 2000 | Kitt Peak | Spacewatch | EUN | 1.8 km | MPC · JPL |
| 219334 | 2000 OT_{8} | — | July 23, 2000 | Socorro | LINEAR | · | 4.6 km | MPC · JPL |
| 219335 | 2000 OB_{40} | — | July 30, 2000 | Socorro | LINEAR | · | 2.8 km | MPC · JPL |
| 219336 | 2000 OL_{60} | — | July 29, 2000 | Anderson Mesa | LONEOS | · | 2.6 km | MPC · JPL |
| 219337 | 2000 PD_{26} | — | August 5, 2000 | Haleakala | NEAT | HNS | 2.4 km | MPC · JPL |
| 219338 | 2000 QZ_{14} | — | August 24, 2000 | Socorro | LINEAR | · | 2.6 km | MPC · JPL |
| 219339 | 2000 QP_{23} | — | August 25, 2000 | Socorro | LINEAR | · | 2.8 km | MPC · JPL |
| 219340 | 2000 QM_{34} | — | August 26, 2000 | Socorro | LINEAR | · | 3.3 km | MPC · JPL |
| 219341 | 2000 QY_{46} | — | August 24, 2000 | Socorro | LINEAR | · | 3.1 km | MPC · JPL |
| 219342 | 2000 QC_{61} | — | August 26, 2000 | Socorro | LINEAR | · | 2.8 km | MPC · JPL |
| 219343 | 2000 QR_{111} | — | August 24, 2000 | Socorro | LINEAR | · | 3.0 km | MPC · JPL |
| 219344 | 2000 QD_{139} | — | August 31, 2000 | Socorro | LINEAR | · | 3.0 km | MPC · JPL |
| 219345 | 2000 QZ_{153} | — | August 31, 2000 | Socorro | LINEAR | · | 3.7 km | MPC · JPL |
| 219346 | 2000 QW_{155} | — | August 31, 2000 | Socorro | LINEAR | EUN | 2.0 km | MPC · JPL |
| 219347 | 2000 QW_{163} | — | August 31, 2000 | Socorro | LINEAR | · | 3.1 km | MPC · JPL |
| 219348 | 2000 QU_{189} | — | August 26, 2000 | Socorro | LINEAR | · | 3.7 km | MPC · JPL |
| 219349 | 2000 QY_{194} | — | August 26, 2000 | Socorro | LINEAR | · | 1.8 km | MPC · JPL |
| 219350 | 2000 QL_{228} | — | August 31, 2000 | Socorro | LINEAR | · | 2.7 km | MPC · JPL |
| 219351 | 2000 QB_{229} | — | August 31, 2000 | Socorro | LINEAR | · | 3.0 km | MPC · JPL |
| 219352 | 2000 RK_{19} | — | September 1, 2000 | Socorro | LINEAR | · | 4.7 km | MPC · JPL |
| 219353 | 2000 RM_{29} | — | September 1, 2000 | Socorro | LINEAR | · | 3.2 km | MPC · JPL |
| 219354 | 2000 RJ_{35} | — | September 1, 2000 | Socorro | LINEAR | · | 3.3 km | MPC · JPL |
| 219355 | 2000 RW_{42} | — | September 3, 2000 | Socorro | LINEAR | · | 3.6 km | MPC · JPL |
| 219356 | 2000 RV_{44} | — | September 3, 2000 | Socorro | LINEAR | · | 3.2 km | MPC · JPL |
| 219357 | 2000 RW_{49} | — | September 5, 2000 | Socorro | LINEAR | · | 3.9 km | MPC · JPL |
| 219358 | 2000 RA_{79} | — | September 9, 2000 | Anderson Mesa | LONEOS | · | 2.4 km | MPC · JPL |
| 219359 | 2000 RG_{80} | — | September 1, 2000 | Socorro | LINEAR | · | 2.2 km | MPC · JPL |
| 219360 | 2000 RB_{83} | — | September 1, 2000 | Socorro | LINEAR | · | 3.6 km | MPC · JPL |
| 219361 | 2000 RW_{89} | — | September 3, 2000 | Socorro | LINEAR | · | 2.1 km | MPC · JPL |
| 219362 | 2000 RM_{96} | — | September 4, 2000 | Kitt Peak | Spacewatch | · | 2.7 km | MPC · JPL |
| 219363 | 2000 RD_{99} | — | September 5, 2000 | Anderson Mesa | LONEOS | · | 3.0 km | MPC · JPL |
| 219364 | 2000 SG_{2} | — | September 20, 2000 | Socorro | LINEAR | RAF | 1.6 km | MPC · JPL |
| 219365 | 2000 SC_{10} | — | September 24, 2000 | Drebach | J. Kandler | · | 2.9 km | MPC · JPL |
| 219366 | 2000 SU_{12} | — | September 20, 2000 | Socorro | LINEAR | · | 3.3 km | MPC · JPL |
| 219367 | 2000 SD_{15} | — | September 23, 2000 | Socorro | LINEAR | · | 2.9 km | MPC · JPL |
| 219368 | 2000 SO_{20} | — | September 23, 2000 | Socorro | LINEAR | · | 3.7 km | MPC · JPL |
| 219369 | 2000 SU_{21} | — | September 24, 2000 | Socorro | LINEAR | · | 2.1 km | MPC · JPL |
| 219370 | 2000 SS_{38} | — | September 24, 2000 | Socorro | LINEAR | · | 4.1 km | MPC · JPL |
| 219371 | 2000 SR_{40} | — | September 24, 2000 | Socorro | LINEAR | · | 3.3 km | MPC · JPL |
| 219372 | 2000 SB_{42} | — | September 24, 2000 | Socorro | LINEAR | · | 2.9 km | MPC · JPL |
| 219373 | 2000 SR_{45} | — | September 22, 2000 | Socorro | LINEAR | · | 2.3 km | MPC · JPL |
| 219374 | 2000 SR_{48} | — | September 23, 2000 | Socorro | LINEAR | · | 2.0 km | MPC · JPL |
| 219375 | 2000 SH_{49} | — | September 23, 2000 | Socorro | LINEAR | · | 2.7 km | MPC · JPL |
| 219376 | 2000 SB_{51} | — | September 23, 2000 | Socorro | LINEAR | · | 3.0 km | MPC · JPL |
| 219377 | 2000 SS_{61} | — | September 24, 2000 | Socorro | LINEAR | · | 2.4 km | MPC · JPL |
| 219378 | 2000 SX_{63} | — | September 24, 2000 | Socorro | LINEAR | · | 3.1 km | MPC · JPL |
| 219379 | 2000 SX_{76} | — | September 24, 2000 | Socorro | LINEAR | · | 2.7 km | MPC · JPL |
| 219380 | 2000 SB_{78} | — | September 24, 2000 | Socorro | LINEAR | · | 3.0 km | MPC · JPL |
| 219381 | 2000 SQ_{78} | — | September 24, 2000 | Socorro | LINEAR | · | 3.1 km | MPC · JPL |
| 219382 | 2000 SU_{89} | — | September 29, 2000 | Emerald Lane | L. Ball | · | 2.5 km | MPC · JPL |
| 219383 | 2000 SB_{93} | — | September 23, 2000 | Socorro | LINEAR | · | 3.2 km | MPC · JPL |
| 219384 | 2000 SE_{100} | — | September 23, 2000 | Socorro | LINEAR | · | 3.7 km | MPC · JPL |
| 219385 | 2000 SW_{101} | — | September 24, 2000 | Socorro | LINEAR | · | 3.3 km | MPC · JPL |
| 219386 | 2000 SD_{113} | — | September 24, 2000 | Socorro | LINEAR | · | 3.4 km | MPC · JPL |
| 219387 | 2000 SC_{130} | — | September 22, 2000 | Socorro | LINEAR | JUN | 1.6 km | MPC · JPL |
| 219388 | 2000 SC_{134} | — | September 23, 2000 | Socorro | LINEAR | · | 3.2 km | MPC · JPL |
| 219389 | 2000 SL_{139} | — | September 23, 2000 | Socorro | LINEAR | · | 2.9 km | MPC · JPL |
| 219390 | 2000 SU_{141} | — | September 23, 2000 | Socorro | LINEAR | · | 1.8 km | MPC · JPL |
| 219391 | 2000 SV_{143} | — | September 24, 2000 | Socorro | LINEAR | · | 3.4 km | MPC · JPL |
| 219392 | 2000 SY_{151} | — | September 24, 2000 | Socorro | LINEAR | · | 2.3 km | MPC · JPL |
| 219393 | 2000 SZ_{155} | — | September 24, 2000 | Socorro | LINEAR | GEF | 2.2 km | MPC · JPL |
| 219394 | 2000 SA_{165} | — | September 23, 2000 | Socorro | LINEAR | · | 3.6 km | MPC · JPL |
| 219395 | 2000 SS_{167} | — | September 23, 2000 | Socorro | LINEAR | · | 4.0 km | MPC · JPL |
| 219396 | 2000 SP_{173} | — | September 28, 2000 | Socorro | LINEAR | · | 3.9 km | MPC · JPL |
| 219397 | 2000 SP_{175} | — | September 28, 2000 | Socorro | LINEAR | · | 4.1 km | MPC · JPL |
| 219398 | 2000 SD_{180} | — | September 28, 2000 | Socorro | LINEAR | · | 2.6 km | MPC · JPL |
| 219399 | 2000 SX_{182} | — | September 20, 2000 | Haleakala | NEAT | · | 2.5 km | MPC · JPL |
| 219400 | 2000 ST_{191} | — | September 24, 2000 | Kitt Peak | Spacewatch | · | 3.0 km | MPC · JPL |

== 219401–219500 ==
back to top

| Designation | | | Discovery | | | Properties | | Ref |
| Permanent | Provisional | Named after | Date | Site | Discoverer(s) | Category | Diam. | Ref |
|---|---|---|---|---|---|---|---|---|
| 219401 | 2000 SN_{197} | — | September 24, 2000 | Socorro | LINEAR | · | 2.4 km | MPC · JPL |
| 219402 | 2000 ST_{207} | — | September 24, 2000 | Socorro | LINEAR | · | 1.9 km | MPC · JPL |
| 219403 | 2000 SV_{208} | — | September 25, 2000 | Socorro | LINEAR | · | 2.6 km | MPC · JPL |
| 219404 | 2000 SC_{209} | — | September 25, 2000 | Socorro | LINEAR | · | 3.2 km | MPC · JPL |
| 219405 | 2000 SC_{214} | — | September 26, 2000 | Socorro | LINEAR | · | 3.2 km | MPC · JPL |
| 219406 | 2000 SO_{220} | — | September 26, 2000 | Socorro | LINEAR | · | 2.6 km | MPC · JPL |
| 219407 | 2000 SL_{230} | — | September 28, 2000 | Socorro | LINEAR | · | 3.8 km | MPC · JPL |
| 219408 | 2000 SF_{237} | — | September 24, 2000 | Socorro | LINEAR | · | 3.7 km | MPC · JPL |
| 219409 | 2000 SS_{243} | — | September 24, 2000 | Socorro | LINEAR | · | 3.3 km | MPC · JPL |
| 219410 | 2000 SC_{260} | — | September 24, 2000 | Socorro | LINEAR | DOR | 4.5 km | MPC · JPL |
| 219411 | 2000 SZ_{260} | — | September 24, 2000 | Socorro | LINEAR | · | 3.1 km | MPC · JPL |
| 219412 | 2000 SZ_{261} | — | September 24, 2000 | Socorro | LINEAR | · | 2.9 km | MPC · JPL |
| 219413 | 2000 SB_{272} | — | September 28, 2000 | Socorro | LINEAR | EUN | 1.9 km | MPC · JPL |
| 219414 | 2000 SK_{279} | — | September 30, 2000 | Socorro | LINEAR | · | 2.2 km | MPC · JPL |
| 219415 | 2000 SH_{296} | — | September 28, 2000 | Socorro | LINEAR | · | 4.1 km | MPC · JPL |
| 219416 | 2000 SG_{306} | — | September 30, 2000 | Socorro | LINEAR | · | 2.5 km | MPC · JPL |
| 219417 | 2000 SJ_{309} | — | September 30, 2000 | Socorro | LINEAR | · | 4.1 km | MPC · JPL |
| 219418 | 2000 SE_{314} | — | September 28, 2000 | Socorro | LINEAR | · | 3.0 km | MPC · JPL |
| 219419 | 2000 SC_{315} | — | September 28, 2000 | Socorro | LINEAR | · | 3.2 km | MPC · JPL |
| 219420 | 2000 SC_{319} | — | September 26, 2000 | Socorro | LINEAR | · | 3.6 km | MPC · JPL |
| 219421 | 2000 SE_{327} | — | September 29, 2000 | Haleakala | NEAT | · | 3.0 km | MPC · JPL |
| 219422 | 2000 SY_{335} | — | September 26, 2000 | Haleakala | NEAT | · | 2.2 km | MPC · JPL |
| 219423 | 2000 SO_{349} | — | September 28, 2000 | Anderson Mesa | LONEOS | · | 2.9 km | MPC · JPL |
| 219424 | 2000 SC_{351} | — | September 29, 2000 | Anderson Mesa | LONEOS | · | 3.2 km | MPC · JPL |
| 219425 | 2000 SN_{358} | — | September 24, 2000 | Socorro | LINEAR | · | 2.3 km | MPC · JPL |
| 219426 | 2000 SL_{368} | — | September 22, 2000 | Anderson Mesa | LONEOS | (18466) | 3.4 km | MPC · JPL |
| 219427 | 2000 SD_{369} | — | September 24, 2000 | Anderson Mesa | LONEOS | DOR | 4.2 km | MPC · JPL |
| 219428 | 2000 TN_{23} | — | October 1, 2000 | Socorro | LINEAR | · | 2.2 km | MPC · JPL |
| 219429 | 2000 TH_{28} | — | October 3, 2000 | Socorro | LINEAR | · | 3.5 km | MPC · JPL |
| 219430 | 2000 TX_{44} | — | October 1, 2000 | Socorro | LINEAR | · | 2.8 km | MPC · JPL |
| 219431 | 2000 TZ_{58} | — | October 2, 2000 | Anderson Mesa | LONEOS | · | 3.9 km | MPC · JPL |
| 219432 | 2000 TH_{65} | — | October 1, 2000 | Socorro | LINEAR | · | 2.5 km | MPC · JPL |
| 219433 | 2000 UA_{18} | — | October 24, 2000 | Socorro | LINEAR | · | 2.9 km | MPC · JPL |
| 219434 | 2000 UG_{22} | — | October 24, 2000 | Socorro | LINEAR | MRX | 2.0 km | MPC · JPL |
| 219435 | 2000 UH_{41} | — | October 24, 2000 | Socorro | LINEAR | DOR | 3.8 km | MPC · JPL |
| 219436 | 2000 US_{51} | — | October 24, 2000 | Socorro | LINEAR | (13314) | 3.0 km | MPC · JPL |
| 219437 | 2000 UC_{62} | — | October 25, 2000 | Socorro | LINEAR | · | 3.2 km | MPC · JPL |
| 219438 | 2000 UM_{64} | — | October 25, 2000 | Socorro | LINEAR | · | 2.6 km | MPC · JPL |
| 219439 | 2000 UZ_{67} | — | October 25, 2000 | Socorro | LINEAR | HOF | 3.8 km | MPC · JPL |
| 219440 | 2000 UV_{69} | — | October 25, 2000 | Socorro | LINEAR | · | 2.4 km | MPC · JPL |
| 219441 | 2000 UH_{80} | — | October 24, 2000 | Socorro | LINEAR | · | 4.0 km | MPC · JPL |
| 219442 | 2000 UB_{94} | — | October 25, 2000 | Socorro | LINEAR | · | 3.2 km | MPC · JPL |
| 219443 | 2000 UG_{97} | — | October 25, 2000 | Socorro | LINEAR | · | 3.6 km | MPC · JPL |
| 219444 | 2000 UY_{104} | — | October 27, 2000 | Socorro | LINEAR | · | 2.9 km | MPC · JPL |
| 219445 | 2000 VQ_{23} | — | November 1, 2000 | Socorro | LINEAR | · | 2.8 km | MPC · JPL |
| 219446 | 2000 VM_{24} | — | November 1, 2000 | Socorro | LINEAR | · | 3.8 km | MPC · JPL |
| 219447 | 2000 VN_{25} | — | November 1, 2000 | Socorro | LINEAR | · | 3.4 km | MPC · JPL |
| 219448 | 2000 WN | — | November 16, 2000 | Socorro | LINEAR | DOR | 4.7 km | MPC · JPL |
| 219449 | 2000 WM_{17} | — | November 21, 2000 | Socorro | LINEAR | · | 3.5 km | MPC · JPL |
| 219450 | 2000 WU_{47} | — | November 21, 2000 | Socorro | LINEAR | BRA | 1.9 km | MPC · JPL |
| 219451 | 2000 WD_{53} | — | November 27, 2000 | Kitt Peak | Spacewatch | · | 4.7 km | MPC · JPL |
| 219452 | 2000 WA_{78} | — | November 20, 2000 | Socorro | LINEAR | · | 2.3 km | MPC · JPL |
| 219453 | 2000 WV_{150} | — | November 19, 2000 | Socorro | LINEAR | · | 3.7 km | MPC · JPL |
| 219454 | 2000 WP_{153} | — | November 29, 2000 | Socorro | LINEAR | · | 5.0 km | MPC · JPL |
| 219455 | 2000 WY_{153} | — | November 30, 2000 | Socorro | LINEAR | GAL | 3.3 km | MPC · JPL |
| 219456 | 2000 WF_{165} | — | November 23, 2000 | Kitt Peak | Spacewatch | · | 3.1 km | MPC · JPL |
| 219457 | 2000 WY_{165} | — | November 24, 2000 | Anderson Mesa | LONEOS | · | 3.2 km | MPC · JPL |
| 219458 | 2000 XU_{2} | — | December 1, 2000 | Socorro | LINEAR | · | 2.8 km | MPC · JPL |
| 219459 | 2000 XT_{20} | — | December 4, 2000 | Socorro | LINEAR | · | 3.6 km | MPC · JPL |
| 219460 | 2000 XN_{36} | — | December 5, 2000 | Socorro | LINEAR | · | 2.8 km | MPC · JPL |
| 219461 | 2000 XY_{41} | — | December 5, 2000 | Socorro | LINEAR | · | 3.4 km | MPC · JPL |
| 219462 | 2000 YP_{1} | — | December 17, 2000 | Socorro | LINEAR | · | 3.8 km | MPC · JPL |
| 219463 | 2000 YV_{24} | — | December 28, 2000 | Kitt Peak | Spacewatch | KOR | 2.5 km | MPC · JPL |
| 219464 | 2000 YS_{36} | — | December 30, 2000 | Socorro | LINEAR | · | 1.5 km | MPC · JPL |
| 219465 | 2000 YR_{66} | — | December 30, 2000 | Socorro | LINEAR | · | 1.6 km | MPC · JPL |
| 219466 | 2001 AQ_{10} | — | January 2, 2001 | Socorro | LINEAR | L4 | 20 km | MPC · JPL |
| 219467 | 2001 AN_{26} | — | January 5, 2001 | Socorro | LINEAR | DOR | 4.7 km | MPC · JPL |
| 219468 | 2001 AU_{38} | — | January 1, 2001 | Kitt Peak | Spacewatch | · | 2.9 km | MPC · JPL |
| 219469 | 2001 BS_{21} | — | January 20, 2001 | Socorro | LINEAR | BRA | 2.6 km | MPC · JPL |
| 219470 | 2001 BJ_{23} | — | January 20, 2001 | Socorro | LINEAR | · | 3.3 km | MPC · JPL |
| 219471 | 2001 BY_{59} | — | January 26, 2001 | Socorro | LINEAR | · | 4.8 km | MPC · JPL |
| 219472 | 2001 CC | — | February 1, 2001 | Kitt Peak | Spacewatch | · | 5.0 km | MPC · JPL |
| 219473 | 2001 CJ_{3} | — | February 1, 2001 | Socorro | LINEAR | · | 1.4 km | MPC · JPL |
| 219474 | 2001 CH_{24} | — | February 1, 2001 | Anderson Mesa | LONEOS | · | 2.9 km | MPC · JPL |
| 219475 | 2001 CS_{26} | — | February 1, 2001 | Kitt Peak | Spacewatch | · | 4.9 km | MPC · JPL |
| 219476 | 2001 CN_{36} | — | February 15, 2001 | Oizumi | T. Kobayashi | · | 4.6 km | MPC · JPL |
| 219477 | 2001 CW_{44} | — | February 15, 2001 | Socorro | LINEAR | · | 5.1 km | MPC · JPL |
| 219478 | 2001 CO_{47} | — | February 12, 2001 | Anderson Mesa | LONEOS | TIR | 4.7 km | MPC · JPL |
| 219479 | 2001 DB_{7} | — | February 17, 2001 | Eskridge | Farpoint | · | 4.5 km | MPC · JPL |
| 219480 | 2001 DJ_{9} | — | February 16, 2001 | Oaxaca | Roe, J. M. | · | 4.1 km | MPC · JPL |
| 219481 | 2001 DF_{15} | — | February 20, 2001 | Haleakala | NEAT | · | 2.9 km | MPC · JPL |
| 219482 | 2001 DF_{29} | — | February 17, 2001 | Socorro | LINEAR | · | 1.2 km | MPC · JPL |
| 219483 | 2001 DQ_{35} | — | February 19, 2001 | Socorro | LINEAR | · | 5.6 km | MPC · JPL |
| 219484 | 2001 DX_{43} | — | February 19, 2001 | Socorro | LINEAR | · | 2.8 km | MPC · JPL |
| 219485 | 2001 DM_{82} | — | February 22, 2001 | Kitt Peak | Spacewatch | · | 3.5 km | MPC · JPL |
| 219486 | 2001 DZ_{93} | — | February 19, 2001 | Socorro | LINEAR | · | 1 km | MPC · JPL |
| 219487 | 2001 DE_{107} | — | February 20, 2001 | Kitt Peak | Spacewatch | EOS | 3.1 km | MPC · JPL |
| 219488 | 2001 EU_{2} | — | March 3, 2001 | Socorro | LINEAR | · | 1.0 km | MPC · JPL |
| 219489 | 2001 EG_{5} | — | March 2, 2001 | Anderson Mesa | LONEOS | · | 4.2 km | MPC · JPL |
| 219490 | 2001 EL_{26} | — | March 2, 2001 | Anderson Mesa | LONEOS | · | 4.4 km | MPC · JPL |
| 219491 | 2001 FK_{1} | — | March 18, 2001 | Prescott | P. G. Comba | · | 1.3 km | MPC · JPL |
| 219492 | 2001 FR_{32} | — | March 18, 2001 | Socorro | LINEAR | · | 2.0 km | MPC · JPL |
| 219493 | 2001 FD_{52} | — | March 18, 2001 | Socorro | LINEAR | · | 5.1 km | MPC · JPL |
| 219494 | 2001 FJ_{58} | — | March 19, 2001 | Socorro | LINEAR | · | 1.8 km | MPC · JPL |
| 219495 | 2001 FU_{73} | — | March 19, 2001 | Socorro | LINEAR | · | 4.0 km | MPC · JPL |
| 219496 | 2001 FK_{87} | — | March 21, 2001 | Anderson Mesa | LONEOS | · | 1.3 km | MPC · JPL |
| 219497 | 2001 FC_{88} | — | March 21, 2001 | Anderson Mesa | LONEOS | PHO | 3.1 km | MPC · JPL |
| 219498 | 2001 FR_{105} | — | March 18, 2001 | Anderson Mesa | LONEOS | · | 4.1 km | MPC · JPL |
| 219499 | 2001 FX_{108} | — | March 18, 2001 | Socorro | LINEAR | · | 5.2 km | MPC · JPL |
| 219500 | 2001 FN_{124} | — | March 27, 2001 | Anderson Mesa | LONEOS | · | 4.6 km | MPC · JPL |

== 219501–219600 ==
back to top

| Designation | | | Discovery | | | Properties | | Ref |
| Permanent | Provisional | Named after | Date | Site | Discoverer(s) | Category | Diam. | Ref |
|---|---|---|---|---|---|---|---|---|
| 219501 | 2001 FL_{156} | — | March 26, 2001 | Haleakala | NEAT | · | 1.0 km | MPC · JPL |
| 219502 | 2001 FJ_{158} | — | March 27, 2001 | Haleakala | NEAT | · | 4.5 km | MPC · JPL |
| 219503 | 2001 FG_{164} | — | March 18, 2001 | Haleakala | NEAT | HYG | 4.6 km | MPC · JPL |
| 219504 | 2001 FL_{196} | — | March 26, 2001 | Socorro | LINEAR | · | 940 m | MPC · JPL |
| 219505 | 2001 HU_{42} | — | April 16, 2001 | Socorro | LINEAR | · | 2.5 km | MPC · JPL |
| 219506 | 2001 HQ_{47} | — | April 18, 2001 | Haleakala | NEAT | · | 1.3 km | MPC · JPL |
| 219507 | 2001 HT_{64} | — | April 27, 2001 | Haleakala | NEAT | ERI | 2.7 km | MPC · JPL |
| 219508 | 2001 KE_{6} | — | May 17, 2001 | Socorro | LINEAR | · | 6.7 km | MPC · JPL |
| 219509 | 2001 KC_{16} | — | May 18, 2001 | Socorro | LINEAR | · | 1.4 km | MPC · JPL |
| 219510 | 2001 MU_{16} | — | June 27, 2001 | Palomar | NEAT | · | 1.6 km | MPC · JPL |
| 219511 | 2001 MU_{19} | — | June 25, 2001 | Palomar | NEAT | · | 1.8 km | MPC · JPL |
| 219512 | 2001 NG_{5} | — | July 13, 2001 | Palomar | NEAT | · | 1.7 km | MPC · JPL |
| 219513 | 2001 OZ_{29} | — | July 19, 2001 | Palomar | NEAT | · | 1.7 km | MPC · JPL |
| 219514 | 2001 OQ_{31} | — | July 22, 2001 | Palomar | NEAT | · | 1.9 km | MPC · JPL |
| 219515 | 2001 OY_{39} | — | July 20, 2001 | Palomar | NEAT | · | 6.1 km | MPC · JPL |
| 219516 | 2001 OZ_{50} | — | July 21, 2001 | Palomar | NEAT | · | 1.5 km | MPC · JPL |
| 219517 | 2001 OH_{89} | — | July 21, 2001 | Haleakala | NEAT | · | 2.9 km | MPC · JPL |
| 219518 | 2001 PK_{20} | — | August 10, 2001 | Palomar | NEAT | EUN | 1.8 km | MPC · JPL |
| 219519 | 2001 QV_{44} | — | August 16, 2001 | Socorro | LINEAR | · | 1.8 km | MPC · JPL |
| 219520 | 2001 QG_{54} | — | August 16, 2001 | Socorro | LINEAR | · | 2.2 km | MPC · JPL |
| 219521 | 2001 QH_{54} | — | August 16, 2001 | Socorro | LINEAR | PHO | 1.2 km | MPC · JPL |
| 219522 | 2001 QH_{83} | — | August 17, 2001 | Socorro | LINEAR | · | 2.1 km | MPC · JPL |
| 219523 | 2001 QS_{84} | — | August 18, 2001 | Socorro | LINEAR | · | 2.7 km | MPC · JPL |
| 219524 | 2001 QZ_{93} | — | August 22, 2001 | Socorro | LINEAR | · | 1.6 km | MPC · JPL |
| 219525 | 2001 QG_{97} | — | August 17, 2001 | Socorro | LINEAR | · | 1.9 km | MPC · JPL |
| 219526 | 2001 QE_{117} | — | August 17, 2001 | Socorro | LINEAR | · | 2.0 km | MPC · JPL |
| 219527 | 2001 QK_{142} | — | August 23, 2001 | Anderson Mesa | LONEOS | AMO +1km | 1.4 km | MPC · JPL |
| 219528 | 2001 QL_{149} | — | August 22, 2001 | Haleakala | NEAT | H | 660 m | MPC · JPL |
| 219529 | 2001 QC_{169} | — | August 26, 2001 | Palomar | NEAT | · | 1.7 km | MPC · JPL |
| 219530 | 2001 QE_{171} | — | August 24, 2001 | Socorro | LINEAR | (5) | 2.0 km | MPC · JPL |
| 219531 | 2001 QN_{173} | — | August 25, 2001 | Socorro | LINEAR | · | 1.5 km | MPC · JPL |
| 219532 | 2001 QF_{177} | — | August 26, 2001 | Kitt Peak | Spacewatch | (5) | 1.4 km | MPC · JPL |
| 219533 | 2001 QO_{184} | — | August 21, 2001 | Socorro | LINEAR | · | 2.2 km | MPC · JPL |
| 219534 | 2001 QH_{188} | — | August 21, 2001 | Haleakala | NEAT | · | 4.2 km | MPC · JPL |
| 219535 | 2001 QZ_{195} | — | August 22, 2001 | Palomar | NEAT | H | 970 m | MPC · JPL |
| 219536 | 2001 QV_{199} | — | August 22, 2001 | Socorro | LINEAR | · | 1.9 km | MPC · JPL |
| 219537 | 2001 QR_{201} | — | August 22, 2001 | Kitt Peak | Spacewatch | · | 2.3 km | MPC · JPL |
| 219538 | 2001 QR_{229} | — | August 24, 2001 | Anderson Mesa | LONEOS | · | 1.8 km | MPC · JPL |
| 219539 | 2001 QL_{238} | — | August 24, 2001 | Socorro | LINEAR | H | 790 m | MPC · JPL |
| 219540 | 2001 QD_{248} | — | August 24, 2001 | Socorro | LINEAR | · | 1.7 km | MPC · JPL |
| 219541 | 2001 QZ_{249} | — | August 24, 2001 | Haleakala | NEAT | PHO | 3.8 km | MPC · JPL |
| 219542 | 2001 QH_{268} | — | August 20, 2001 | Palomar | NEAT | H | 890 m | MPC · JPL |
| 219543 | 2001 QB_{293} | — | August 16, 2001 | Palomar | NEAT | slow | 1.9 km | MPC · JPL |
| 219544 | 2001 RA_{6} | — | September 8, 2001 | Socorro | LINEAR | H | 1.0 km | MPC · JPL |
| 219545 | 2001 RN_{27} | — | September 7, 2001 | Socorro | LINEAR | 3:2 | 9.5 km | MPC · JPL |
| 219546 | 2001 RK_{34} | — | September 8, 2001 | Socorro | LINEAR | · | 2.1 km | MPC · JPL |
| 219547 | 2001 RD_{44} | — | September 12, 2001 | Palomar | NEAT | · | 1.6 km | MPC · JPL |
| 219548 | 2001 RA_{66} | — | September 10, 2001 | Socorro | LINEAR | · | 1.7 km | MPC · JPL |
| 219549 | 2001 RT_{73} | — | September 10, 2001 | Socorro | LINEAR | · | 700 m | MPC · JPL |
| 219550 | 2001 RQ_{78} | — | September 10, 2001 | Socorro | LINEAR | · | 2.2 km | MPC · JPL |
| 219551 | 2001 RZ_{83} | — | September 11, 2001 | Anderson Mesa | LONEOS | H | 880 m | MPC · JPL |
| 219552 | 2001 RY_{107} | — | September 12, 2001 | Socorro | LINEAR | · | 1.4 km | MPC · JPL |
| 219553 | 2001 RL_{115} | — | September 12, 2001 | Socorro | LINEAR | (2076) | 1.2 km | MPC · JPL |
| 219554 | 2001 RM_{123} | — | September 12, 2001 | Socorro | LINEAR | · | 1.6 km | MPC · JPL |
| 219555 | 2001 RA_{125} | — | September 12, 2001 | Socorro | LINEAR | 3:2 | 7.7 km | MPC · JPL |
| 219556 | 2001 RM_{127} | — | September 12, 2001 | Socorro | LINEAR | · | 2.1 km | MPC · JPL |
| 219557 | 2001 RL_{132} | — | September 12, 2001 | Socorro | LINEAR | · | 1.2 km | MPC · JPL |
| 219558 | 2001 RE_{142} | — | September 15, 2001 | Palomar | NEAT | · | 3.8 km | MPC · JPL |
| 219559 | 2001 RK_{154} | — | September 10, 2001 | Socorro | LINEAR | (194) | 1.5 km | MPC · JPL |
| 219560 | 2001 SX | — | September 17, 2001 | Desert Eagle | W. K. Y. Yeung | · | 1.8 km | MPC · JPL |
| 219561 | 2001 SC_{26} | — | September 16, 2001 | Socorro | LINEAR | · | 1.2 km | MPC · JPL |
| 219562 | 2001 SO_{28} | — | September 16, 2001 | Socorro | LINEAR | · | 1.1 km | MPC · JPL |
| 219563 | 2001 SX_{31} | — | September 16, 2001 | Socorro | LINEAR | (5) | 1.1 km | MPC · JPL |
| 219564 | 2001 SU_{90} | — | September 20, 2001 | Socorro | LINEAR | · | 1.5 km | MPC · JPL |
| 219565 | 2001 SZ_{95} | — | September 20, 2001 | Socorro | LINEAR | · | 1.2 km | MPC · JPL |
| 219566 | 2001 SN_{101} | — | September 20, 2001 | Socorro | LINEAR | · | 1.5 km | MPC · JPL |
| 219567 | 2001 SB_{115} | — | September 20, 2001 | Desert Eagle | W. K. Y. Yeung | · | 1.6 km | MPC · JPL |
| 219568 | 2001 SY_{117} | — | September 16, 2001 | Socorro | LINEAR | · | 1.9 km | MPC · JPL |
| 219569 | 2001 SR_{126} | — | September 16, 2001 | Socorro | LINEAR | · | 1.3 km | MPC · JPL |
| 219570 | 2001 ST_{129} | — | September 16, 2001 | Socorro | LINEAR | · | 1.2 km | MPC · JPL |
| 219571 | 2001 SU_{132} | — | September 16, 2001 | Socorro | LINEAR | · | 1.3 km | MPC · JPL |
| 219572 | 2001 SF_{142} | — | September 16, 2001 | Socorro | LINEAR | · | 1.9 km | MPC · JPL |
| 219573 | 2001 SP_{146} | — | September 16, 2001 | Socorro | LINEAR | · | 1.2 km | MPC · JPL |
| 219574 | 2001 SH_{159} | — | September 17, 2001 | Socorro | LINEAR | · | 1.7 km | MPC · JPL |
| 219575 | 2001 SC_{219} | — | September 19, 2001 | Socorro | LINEAR | · | 1.2 km | MPC · JPL |
| 219576 | 2001 SJ_{221} | — | September 19, 2001 | Socorro | LINEAR | · | 1.9 km | MPC · JPL |
| 219577 | 2001 ST_{221} | — | September 19, 2001 | Socorro | LINEAR | · | 1.1 km | MPC · JPL |
| 219578 | 2001 SQ_{234} | — | September 19, 2001 | Socorro | LINEAR | · | 1.3 km | MPC · JPL |
| 219579 | 2001 SK_{244} | — | September 19, 2001 | Socorro | LINEAR | · | 1.6 km | MPC · JPL |
| 219580 | 2001 SE_{252} | — | September 19, 2001 | Socorro | LINEAR | · | 1.1 km | MPC · JPL |
| 219581 | 2001 SN_{253} | — | September 19, 2001 | Socorro | LINEAR | · | 1.1 km | MPC · JPL |
| 219582 | 2001 SK_{304} | — | September 20, 2001 | Socorro | LINEAR | · | 910 m | MPC · JPL |
| 219583 | 2001 SM_{311} | — | September 19, 2001 | Socorro | LINEAR | H | 770 m | MPC · JPL |
| 219584 | 2001 SS_{317} | — | September 19, 2001 | Socorro | LINEAR | NYS | 1.4 km | MPC · JPL |
| 219585 | 2001 SB_{328} | — | September 18, 2001 | Anderson Mesa | LONEOS | · | 1.5 km | MPC · JPL |
| 219586 | 2001 SL_{337} | — | September 20, 2001 | Kitt Peak | Spacewatch | · | 1.1 km | MPC · JPL |
| 219587 | 2001 TH_{3} | — | October 7, 2001 | Palomar | NEAT | (5) | 1.3 km | MPC · JPL |
| 219588 | 2001 TJ_{8} | — | October 9, 2001 | Socorro | LINEAR | · | 1.7 km | MPC · JPL |
| 219589 | 2001 TA_{18} | — | October 14, 2001 | Desert Eagle | W. K. Y. Yeung | · | 1.9 km | MPC · JPL |
| 219590 | 2001 TQ_{18} | — | October 15, 2001 | Emerald Lane | L. Ball | (5) | 1.6 km | MPC · JPL |
| 219591 | 2001 TB_{22} | — | October 11, 2001 | Socorro | LINEAR | · | 2.3 km | MPC · JPL |
| 219592 | 2001 TS_{31} | — | October 14, 2001 | Socorro | LINEAR | · | 2.5 km | MPC · JPL |
| 219593 | 2001 TN_{34} | — | October 14, 2001 | Socorro | LINEAR | HNS | 2.4 km | MPC · JPL |
| 219594 | 2001 TC_{35} | — | October 14, 2001 | Socorro | LINEAR | EUN | 1.7 km | MPC · JPL |
| 219595 | 2001 TR_{39} | — | October 14, 2001 | Socorro | LINEAR | · | 2.6 km | MPC · JPL |
| 219596 | 2001 TE_{40} | — | October 14, 2001 | Socorro | LINEAR | · | 3.7 km | MPC · JPL |
| 219597 | 2001 TJ_{44} | — | October 14, 2001 | Socorro | LINEAR | · | 3.0 km | MPC · JPL |
| 219598 | 2001 TF_{49} | — | October 15, 2001 | Desert Eagle | W. K. Y. Yeung | · | 2.4 km | MPC · JPL |
| 219599 | 2001 TL_{55} | — | October 14, 2001 | Socorro | LINEAR | · | 1.5 km | MPC · JPL |
| 219600 | 2001 TO_{57} | — | October 13, 2001 | Socorro | LINEAR | · | 2.4 km | MPC · JPL |

== 219601–219700 ==
back to top

| Designation | | | Discovery | | | Properties | | Ref |
| Permanent | Provisional | Named after | Date | Site | Discoverer(s) | Category | Diam. | Ref |
|---|---|---|---|---|---|---|---|---|
| 219601 | 2001 TK_{64} | — | October 13, 2001 | Socorro | LINEAR | · | 2.6 km | MPC · JPL |
| 219602 | 2001 TU_{81} | — | October 14, 2001 | Socorro | LINEAR | · | 1.3 km | MPC · JPL |
| 219603 | 2001 TO_{84} | — | October 14, 2001 | Socorro | LINEAR | · | 1.4 km | MPC · JPL |
| 219604 | 2001 TB_{85} | — | October 14, 2001 | Socorro | LINEAR | (5) | 1.4 km | MPC · JPL |
| 219605 | 2001 TD_{85} | — | October 14, 2001 | Socorro | LINEAR | (5) | 1.4 km | MPC · JPL |
| 219606 | 2001 TN_{91} | — | October 14, 2001 | Socorro | LINEAR | · | 1.5 km | MPC · JPL |
| 219607 | 2001 TT_{91} | — | October 14, 2001 | Socorro | LINEAR | · | 1.3 km | MPC · JPL |
| 219608 | 2001 TO_{94} | — | October 14, 2001 | Socorro | LINEAR | (5) | 1.7 km | MPC · JPL |
| 219609 | 2001 TD_{95} | — | October 14, 2001 | Socorro | LINEAR | · | 1.4 km | MPC · JPL |
| 219610 | 2001 TN_{96} | — | October 14, 2001 | Socorro | LINEAR | · | 1.8 km | MPC · JPL |
| 219611 | 2001 TF_{101} | — | October 14, 2001 | Socorro | LINEAR | (5) | 1.6 km | MPC · JPL |
| 219612 | 2001 TX_{107} | — | October 13, 2001 | Socorro | LINEAR | · | 6.2 km | MPC · JPL |
| 219613 | 2001 TC_{108} | — | October 13, 2001 | Socorro | LINEAR | · | 3.7 km | MPC · JPL |
| 219614 | 2001 TO_{113} | — | October 14, 2001 | Socorro | LINEAR | · | 1.3 km | MPC · JPL |
| 219615 | 2001 TH_{119} | — | October 15, 2001 | Socorro | LINEAR | EUN | 1.9 km | MPC · JPL |
| 219616 | 2001 TM_{119} | — | October 15, 2001 | Socorro | LINEAR | EUN | 2.0 km | MPC · JPL |
| 219617 | 2001 TP_{119} | — | October 15, 2001 | Socorro | LINEAR | MAR | 1.8 km | MPC · JPL |
| 219618 | 2001 TY_{120} | — | October 15, 2001 | Socorro | LINEAR | · | 1.8 km | MPC · JPL |
| 219619 | 2001 TY_{123} | — | October 12, 2001 | Haleakala | NEAT | · | 1.9 km | MPC · JPL |
| 219620 | 2001 TM_{131} | — | October 11, 2001 | Palomar | NEAT | · | 3.3 km | MPC · JPL |
| 219621 | 2001 TJ_{172} | — | October 13, 2001 | Socorro | LINEAR | · | 1.3 km | MPC · JPL |
| 219622 | 2001 TP_{191} | — | October 14, 2001 | Socorro | LINEAR | (5) | 1.4 km | MPC · JPL |
| 219623 | 2001 TY_{193} | — | October 15, 2001 | Socorro | LINEAR | (5) | 1.7 km | MPC · JPL |
| 219624 | 2001 TS_{201} | — | October 11, 2001 | Socorro | LINEAR | · | 1.5 km | MPC · JPL |
| 219625 | 2001 TY_{205} | — | October 11, 2001 | Socorro | LINEAR | · | 4.3 km | MPC · JPL |
| 219626 | 2001 TW_{206} | — | October 11, 2001 | Palomar | NEAT | · | 1.5 km | MPC · JPL |
| 219627 | 2001 TU_{210} | — | October 13, 2001 | Anderson Mesa | LONEOS | · | 1.8 km | MPC · JPL |
| 219628 | 2001 TB_{211} | — | October 13, 2001 | Palomar | NEAT | · | 2.4 km | MPC · JPL |
| 219629 | 2001 TC_{224} | — | October 14, 2001 | Socorro | LINEAR | · | 1.7 km | MPC · JPL |
| 219630 | 2001 TZ_{235} | — | October 15, 2001 | Palomar | NEAT | · | 1.8 km | MPC · JPL |
| 219631 | 2001 TX_{240} | — | October 14, 2001 | Socorro | LINEAR | · | 3.9 km | MPC · JPL |
| 219632 | 2001 UC_{11} | — | October 22, 2001 | Desert Eagle | W. K. Y. Yeung | · | 2.0 km | MPC · JPL |
| 219633 | 2001 UN_{17} | — | October 18, 2001 | Socorro | LINEAR | H | 760 m | MPC · JPL |
| 219634 | 2001 UK_{33} | — | October 16, 2001 | Socorro | LINEAR | · | 2.0 km | MPC · JPL |
| 219635 | 2001 UV_{33} | — | October 16, 2001 | Socorro | LINEAR | · | 1.9 km | MPC · JPL |
| 219636 | 2001 UD_{57} | — | October 17, 2001 | Socorro | LINEAR | · | 1.5 km | MPC · JPL |
| 219637 | 2001 UP_{63} | — | October 17, 2001 | Socorro | LINEAR | · | 2.6 km | MPC · JPL |
| 219638 | 2001 UB_{65} | — | October 18, 2001 | Socorro | LINEAR | · | 1.5 km | MPC · JPL |
| 219639 | 2001 UF_{66} | — | October 18, 2001 | Socorro | LINEAR | · | 1.5 km | MPC · JPL |
| 219640 | 2001 UR_{70} | — | October 17, 2001 | Kitt Peak | Spacewatch | · | 1.5 km | MPC · JPL |
| 219641 | 2001 UQ_{76} | — | October 17, 2001 | Socorro | LINEAR | · | 1.9 km | MPC · JPL |
| 219642 | 2001 UW_{76} | — | October 17, 2001 | Socorro | LINEAR | · | 1.8 km | MPC · JPL |
| 219643 | 2001 UX_{76} | — | October 17, 2001 | Socorro | LINEAR | (5) | 1.9 km | MPC · JPL |
| 219644 | 2001 UW_{81} | — | October 20, 2001 | Socorro | LINEAR | · | 1.5 km | MPC · JPL |
| 219645 | 2001 UA_{82} | — | October 20, 2001 | Socorro | LINEAR | · | 2.1 km | MPC · JPL |
| 219646 | 2001 UF_{101} | — | October 20, 2001 | Socorro | LINEAR | · | 1.4 km | MPC · JPL |
| 219647 | 2001 UE_{114} | — | October 22, 2001 | Socorro | LINEAR | (5) | 1.6 km | MPC · JPL |
| 219648 | 2001 UH_{119} | — | October 22, 2001 | Socorro | LINEAR | · | 1.9 km | MPC · JPL |
| 219649 | 2001 US_{127} | — | October 17, 2001 | Socorro | LINEAR | EUN | 2.7 km | MPC · JPL |
| 219650 | 2001 US_{134} | — | October 21, 2001 | Socorro | LINEAR | · | 2.0 km | MPC · JPL |
| 219651 | 2001 UD_{160} | — | October 23, 2001 | Socorro | LINEAR | EUN | 1.3 km | MPC · JPL |
| 219652 | 2001 UB_{162} | — | October 23, 2001 | Socorro | LINEAR | HNS | 2.4 km | MPC · JPL |
| 219653 | 2001 UC_{172} | — | October 18, 2001 | Palomar | NEAT | · | 1.4 km | MPC · JPL |
| 219654 | 2001 UR_{173} | — | October 18, 2001 | Palomar | NEAT | · | 1.5 km | MPC · JPL |
| 219655 | 2001 UY_{213} | — | October 23, 2001 | Anderson Mesa | LONEOS | MAR | 1.6 km | MPC · JPL |
| 219656 | 2001 UU_{217} | — | October 24, 2001 | Palomar | NEAT | · | 1.4 km | MPC · JPL |
| 219657 | 2001 VA_{2} | — | November 10, 2001 | Heppenheim | Starkenburg | · | 5.4 km | MPC · JPL |
| 219658 | 2001 VD_{3} | — | November 9, 2001 | Kitt Peak | Spacewatch | · | 1.7 km | MPC · JPL |
| 219659 | 2001 VK_{6} | — | November 9, 2001 | Socorro | LINEAR | · | 1.5 km | MPC · JPL |
| 219660 | 2001 VC_{11} | — | November 10, 2001 | Socorro | LINEAR | EUN | 2.0 km | MPC · JPL |
| 219661 | 2001 VA_{12} | — | November 10, 2001 | Socorro | LINEAR | · | 2.3 km | MPC · JPL |
| 219662 | 2001 VM_{12} | — | November 10, 2001 | Socorro | LINEAR | · | 2.1 km | MPC · JPL |
| 219663 | 2001 VZ_{13} | — | November 10, 2001 | Socorro | LINEAR | · | 2.5 km | MPC · JPL |
| 219664 | 2001 VM_{17} | — | November 9, 2001 | Bergisch Gladbach | W. Bickel | · | 1.6 km | MPC · JPL |
| 219665 | 2001 VG_{19} | — | November 9, 2001 | Socorro | LINEAR | (5) | 1.4 km | MPC · JPL |
| 219666 | 2001 VG_{25} | — | November 9, 2001 | Socorro | LINEAR | · | 1.4 km | MPC · JPL |
| 219667 | 2001 VZ_{33} | — | November 9, 2001 | Socorro | LINEAR | · | 1.7 km | MPC · JPL |
| 219668 | 2001 VQ_{37} | — | November 9, 2001 | Socorro | LINEAR | (5) | 2.7 km | MPC · JPL |
| 219669 | 2001 VJ_{39} | — | November 9, 2001 | Socorro | LINEAR | · | 1.7 km | MPC · JPL |
| 219670 | 2001 VW_{49} | — | November 10, 2001 | Socorro | LINEAR | · | 2.1 km | MPC · JPL |
| 219671 | 2001 VS_{50} | — | November 10, 2001 | Socorro | LINEAR | · | 2.3 km | MPC · JPL |
| 219672 | 2001 VB_{80} | — | November 9, 2001 | Palomar | NEAT | · | 2.9 km | MPC · JPL |
| 219673 | 2001 VH_{88} | — | November 12, 2001 | Haleakala | NEAT | · | 4.3 km | MPC · JPL |
| 219674 | 2001 VV_{91} | — | November 15, 2001 | Socorro | LINEAR | EUN | 1.7 km | MPC · JPL |
| 219675 | 2001 VK_{92} | — | November 15, 2001 | Socorro | LINEAR | MAR | 1.5 km | MPC · JPL |
| 219676 | 2001 VY_{104} | — | November 12, 2001 | Socorro | LINEAR | · | 1.2 km | MPC · JPL |
| 219677 | 2001 VR_{105} | — | November 12, 2001 | Socorro | LINEAR | · | 2.9 km | MPC · JPL |
| 219678 | 2001 VB_{117} | — | November 12, 2001 | Socorro | LINEAR | (5) | 1.5 km | MPC · JPL |
| 219679 | 2001 VA_{121} | — | November 12, 2001 | Socorro | LINEAR | · | 2.3 km | MPC · JPL |
| 219680 | 2001 WS_{14} | — | November 17, 2001 | Kitt Peak | Spacewatch | · | 1.5 km | MPC · JPL |
| 219681 | 2001 WH_{18} | — | November 17, 2001 | Socorro | LINEAR | · | 1.5 km | MPC · JPL |
| 219682 | 2001 WA_{26} | — | November 17, 2001 | Socorro | LINEAR | KRM | 3.3 km | MPC · JPL |
| 219683 | 2001 WM_{32} | — | November 17, 2001 | Socorro | LINEAR | · | 2.0 km | MPC · JPL |
| 219684 | 2001 WO_{34} | — | November 17, 2001 | Socorro | LINEAR | · | 2.2 km | MPC · JPL |
| 219685 | 2001 WR_{36} | — | November 17, 2001 | Socorro | LINEAR | · | 1.8 km | MPC · JPL |
| 219686 | 2001 WE_{37} | — | November 17, 2001 | Socorro | LINEAR | (5) | 1.3 km | MPC · JPL |
| 219687 | 2001 WV_{37} | — | November 17, 2001 | Socorro | LINEAR | · | 2.2 km | MPC · JPL |
| 219688 | 2001 WW_{37} | — | November 17, 2001 | Socorro | LINEAR | · | 2.1 km | MPC · JPL |
| 219689 | 2001 WY_{38} | — | November 17, 2001 | Socorro | LINEAR | · | 1.7 km | MPC · JPL |
| 219690 | 2001 WD_{52} | — | November 19, 2001 | Socorro | LINEAR | EUN | 2.1 km | MPC · JPL |
| 219691 | 2001 WG_{61} | — | November 19, 2001 | Socorro | LINEAR | · | 1.5 km | MPC · JPL |
| 219692 | 2001 WT_{92} | — | November 21, 2001 | Socorro | LINEAR | (5) | 1.4 km | MPC · JPL |
| 219693 | 2001 XX_{1} | — | December 8, 2001 | Socorro | LINEAR | · | 2.1 km | MPC · JPL |
| 219694 | 2001 XM_{11} | — | December 9, 2001 | Socorro | LINEAR | · | 2.9 km | MPC · JPL |
| 219695 | 2001 XO_{16} | — | December 10, 2001 | Uccle | T. Pauwels | · | 2.3 km | MPC · JPL |
| 219696 | 2001 XW_{18} | — | December 9, 2001 | Socorro | LINEAR | · | 2.3 km | MPC · JPL |
| 219697 | 2001 XP_{20} | — | December 9, 2001 | Socorro | LINEAR | (1547) | 2.9 km | MPC · JPL |
| 219698 | 2001 XF_{21} | — | December 9, 2001 | Socorro | LINEAR | · | 2.1 km | MPC · JPL |
| 219699 | 2001 XS_{21} | — | December 9, 2001 | Socorro | LINEAR | · | 2.8 km | MPC · JPL |
| 219700 | 2001 XS_{26} | — | December 10, 2001 | Socorro | LINEAR | · | 1.6 km | MPC · JPL |

== 219701–219800 ==
back to top

| Designation | | | Discovery | | | Properties | | Ref |
| Permanent | Provisional | Named after | Date | Site | Discoverer(s) | Category | Diam. | Ref |
|---|---|---|---|---|---|---|---|---|
| 219701 | 2001 XA_{30} | — | December 11, 2001 | Socorro | LINEAR | · | 4.5 km | MPC · JPL |
| 219702 | 2001 XL_{33} | — | December 11, 2001 | Kitt Peak | Spacewatch | · | 2.4 km | MPC · JPL |
| 219703 | 2001 XB_{35} | — | December 9, 2001 | Socorro | LINEAR | EUN | 2.1 km | MPC · JPL |
| 219704 | 2001 XJ_{36} | — | December 9, 2001 | Socorro | LINEAR | · | 2.4 km | MPC · JPL |
| 219705 | 2001 XJ_{37} | — | December 9, 2001 | Socorro | LINEAR | · | 2.4 km | MPC · JPL |
| 219706 | 2001 XN_{43} | — | December 9, 2001 | Socorro | LINEAR | RAF | 1.5 km | MPC · JPL |
| 219707 | 2001 XV_{44} | — | December 9, 2001 | Socorro | LINEAR | · | 3.1 km | MPC · JPL |
| 219708 | 2001 XJ_{47} | — | December 9, 2001 | Socorro | LINEAR | H | 1.4 km | MPC · JPL |
| 219709 | 2001 XX_{49} | — | December 10, 2001 | Socorro | LINEAR | · | 2.2 km | MPC · JPL |
| 219710 | 2001 XW_{50} | — | December 10, 2001 | Socorro | LINEAR | · | 1.3 km | MPC · JPL |
| 219711 | 2001 XY_{50} | — | December 10, 2001 | Socorro | LINEAR | · | 1.8 km | MPC · JPL |
| 219712 | 2001 XQ_{57} | — | December 10, 2001 | Socorro | LINEAR | · | 4.4 km | MPC · JPL |
| 219713 | 2001 XG_{72} | — | December 11, 2001 | Socorro | LINEAR | · | 1.8 km | MPC · JPL |
| 219714 | 2001 XO_{74} | — | December 11, 2001 | Socorro | LINEAR | · | 1.9 km | MPC · JPL |
| 219715 | 2001 XE_{83} | — | December 11, 2001 | Socorro | LINEAR | · | 1.9 km | MPC · JPL |
| 219716 | 2001 XW_{83} | — | December 11, 2001 | Socorro | LINEAR | (5) · slow | 1.9 km | MPC · JPL |
| 219717 | 2001 XH_{95} | — | December 10, 2001 | Socorro | LINEAR | (5) | 1.7 km | MPC · JPL |
| 219718 | 2001 XL_{97} | — | December 10, 2001 | Socorro | LINEAR | · | 1.4 km | MPC · JPL |
| 219719 | 2001 XR_{105} | — | December 11, 2001 | Uccle | T. Pauwels | · | 2.6 km | MPC · JPL |
| 219720 | 2001 XV_{109} | — | December 11, 2001 | Socorro | LINEAR | · | 1.8 km | MPC · JPL |
| 219721 | 2001 XH_{113} | — | December 11, 2001 | Socorro | LINEAR | · | 1.5 km | MPC · JPL |
| 219722 | 2001 XU_{114} | — | December 13, 2001 | Socorro | LINEAR | · | 3.2 km | MPC · JPL |
| 219723 | 2001 XK_{122} | — | December 14, 2001 | Socorro | LINEAR | · | 1.3 km | MPC · JPL |
| 219724 | 2001 XB_{126} | — | December 14, 2001 | Socorro | LINEAR | · | 1.9 km | MPC · JPL |
| 219725 | 2001 XE_{126} | — | December 14, 2001 | Socorro | LINEAR | (5) | 1.5 km | MPC · JPL |
| 219726 | 2001 XD_{127} | — | December 14, 2001 | Socorro | LINEAR | · | 2.3 km | MPC · JPL |
| 219727 | 2001 XK_{128} | — | December 14, 2001 | Socorro | LINEAR | · | 2.4 km | MPC · JPL |
| 219728 | 2001 XA_{132} | — | December 14, 2001 | Socorro | LINEAR | · | 2.6 km | MPC · JPL |
| 219729 | 2001 XU_{138} | — | December 14, 2001 | Socorro | LINEAR | · | 2.1 km | MPC · JPL |
| 219730 | 2001 XE_{140} | — | December 14, 2001 | Socorro | LINEAR | · | 2.2 km | MPC · JPL |
| 219731 | 2001 XU_{145} | — | December 14, 2001 | Socorro | LINEAR | · | 2.8 km | MPC · JPL |
| 219732 | 2001 XN_{152} | — | December 14, 2001 | Socorro | LINEAR | · | 2.7 km | MPC · JPL |
| 219733 | 2001 XR_{153} | — | December 14, 2001 | Socorro | LINEAR | · | 1.7 km | MPC · JPL |
| 219734 | 2001 XH_{163} | — | December 14, 2001 | Socorro | LINEAR | · | 1.7 km | MPC · JPL |
| 219735 | 2001 XX_{170} | — | December 14, 2001 | Socorro | LINEAR | · | 2.3 km | MPC · JPL |
| 219736 | 2001 XK_{171} | — | December 14, 2001 | Socorro | LINEAR | · | 1.9 km | MPC · JPL |
| 219737 | 2001 XM_{174} | — | December 14, 2001 | Socorro | LINEAR | PAD | 2.6 km | MPC · JPL |
| 219738 | 2001 XY_{189} | — | December 14, 2001 | Socorro | LINEAR | · | 2.7 km | MPC · JPL |
| 219739 | 2001 XY_{190} | — | December 14, 2001 | Socorro | LINEAR | · | 2.6 km | MPC · JPL |
| 219740 | 2001 XE_{212} | — | December 11, 2001 | Socorro | LINEAR | MRX | 1.4 km | MPC · JPL |
| 219741 | 2001 XF_{224} | — | December 15, 2001 | Socorro | LINEAR | · | 1.7 km | MPC · JPL |
| 219742 | 2001 XQ_{224} | — | December 15, 2001 | Socorro | LINEAR | · | 2.1 km | MPC · JPL |
| 219743 | 2001 XZ_{233} | — | December 15, 2001 | Socorro | LINEAR | RAF | 1.9 km | MPC · JPL |
| 219744 | 2001 XW_{238} | — | December 15, 2001 | Socorro | LINEAR | · | 1.8 km | MPC · JPL |
| 219745 | 2001 XA_{239} | — | December 15, 2001 | Socorro | LINEAR | · | 3.1 km | MPC · JPL |
| 219746 | 2001 XQ_{239} | — | December 15, 2001 | Socorro | LINEAR | · | 3.4 km | MPC · JPL |
| 219747 | 2001 XT_{247} | — | December 15, 2001 | Socorro | LINEAR | · | 2.2 km | MPC · JPL |
| 219748 | 2001 XZ_{247} | — | December 13, 2001 | Palomar | NEAT | · | 2.4 km | MPC · JPL |
| 219749 | 2001 XN_{256} | — | December 7, 2001 | Socorro | LINEAR | · | 2.7 km | MPC · JPL |
| 219750 | 2001 YE | — | December 17, 2001 | Palomar | NEAT | · | 3.3 km | MPC · JPL |
| 219751 | 2001 YL_{8} | — | December 17, 2001 | Socorro | LINEAR | · | 4.7 km | MPC · JPL |
| 219752 | 2001 YK_{13} | — | December 17, 2001 | Socorro | LINEAR | · | 1.3 km | MPC · JPL |
| 219753 | 2001 YN_{22} | — | December 18, 2001 | Socorro | LINEAR | · | 2.8 km | MPC · JPL |
| 219754 | 2001 YD_{26} | — | December 18, 2001 | Socorro | LINEAR | · | 1.9 km | MPC · JPL |
| 219755 | 2001 YR_{26} | — | December 18, 2001 | Socorro | LINEAR | · | 1.4 km | MPC · JPL |
| 219756 | 2001 YK_{28} | — | December 18, 2001 | Socorro | LINEAR | WIT | 1.3 km | MPC · JPL |
| 219757 | 2001 YQ_{32} | — | December 18, 2001 | Socorro | LINEAR | · | 2.3 km | MPC · JPL |
| 219758 | 2001 YW_{33} | — | December 18, 2001 | Socorro | LINEAR | · | 1.9 km | MPC · JPL |
| 219759 | 2001 YP_{60} | — | December 18, 2001 | Socorro | LINEAR | · | 2.2 km | MPC · JPL |
| 219760 | 2001 YQ_{60} | — | December 18, 2001 | Socorro | LINEAR | · | 2.6 km | MPC · JPL |
| 219761 | 2001 YR_{76} | — | December 18, 2001 | Socorro | LINEAR | · | 2.5 km | MPC · JPL |
| 219762 | 2001 YJ_{79} | — | December 18, 2001 | Socorro | LINEAR | · | 2.7 km | MPC · JPL |
| 219763 | 2001 YH_{86} | — | December 18, 2001 | Socorro | LINEAR | · | 2.2 km | MPC · JPL |
| 219764 | 2001 YK_{87} | — | December 18, 2001 | Socorro | LINEAR | · | 2.8 km | MPC · JPL |
| 219765 | 2001 YO_{91} | — | December 17, 2001 | Palomar | NEAT | · | 5.2 km | MPC · JPL |
| 219766 | 2001 YS_{93} | — | December 18, 2001 | Kitt Peak | Spacewatch | · | 1.4 km | MPC · JPL |
| 219767 | 2001 YY_{96} | — | December 17, 2001 | Socorro | LINEAR | · | 3.0 km | MPC · JPL |
| 219768 | 2001 YZ_{108} | — | December 18, 2001 | Socorro | LINEAR | (5) | 4.3 km | MPC · JPL |
| 219769 | 2001 YY_{125} | — | December 17, 2001 | Socorro | LINEAR | · | 3.0 km | MPC · JPL |
| 219770 | 2001 YZ_{130} | — | December 17, 2001 | Socorro | LINEAR | · | 2.3 km | MPC · JPL |
| 219771 | 2001 YZ_{135} | — | December 22, 2001 | Socorro | LINEAR | · | 2.5 km | MPC · JPL |
| 219772 | 2001 YX_{137} | — | December 22, 2001 | Socorro | LINEAR | ADE · | 3.2 km | MPC · JPL |
| 219773 | 2001 YD_{138} | — | December 20, 2001 | Palomar | NEAT | EUN | 3.5 km | MPC · JPL |
| 219774 | 2001 YY_{145} | — | December 18, 2001 | Anderson Mesa | LONEOS | slow | 2.5 km | MPC · JPL |
| 219775 | 2002 AU_{2} | — | January 6, 2002 | Socorro | LINEAR | H | 780 m | MPC · JPL |
| 219776 | 2002 AX_{4} | — | January 9, 2002 | Oaxaca | Roe, J. M. | · | 2.6 km | MPC · JPL |
| 219777 | 2002 AY_{5} | — | January 4, 2002 | Palomar | NEAT | · | 3.7 km | MPC · JPL |
| 219778 | 2002 AQ_{8} | — | January 6, 2002 | Kitt Peak | Spacewatch | · | 2.2 km | MPC · JPL |
| 219779 | 2002 AS_{13} | — | January 11, 2002 | Desert Eagle | W. K. Y. Yeung | (1547) | 1.9 km | MPC · JPL |
| 219780 | 2002 AF_{15} | — | January 6, 2002 | Socorro | LINEAR | (1547) | 2.5 km | MPC · JPL |
| 219781 | 2002 AA_{25} | — | January 8, 2002 | Palomar | NEAT | (5) | 1.9 km | MPC · JPL |
| 219782 | 2002 AB_{28} | — | January 7, 2002 | Anderson Mesa | LONEOS | · | 3.3 km | MPC · JPL |
| 219783 | 2002 AL_{28} | — | January 7, 2002 | Anderson Mesa | LONEOS | · | 3.2 km | MPC · JPL |
| 219784 | 2002 AK_{30} | — | January 9, 2002 | Socorro | LINEAR | · | 2.5 km | MPC · JPL |
| 219785 | 2002 AK_{65} | — | January 11, 2002 | Socorro | LINEAR | · | 2.3 km | MPC · JPL |
| 219786 | 2002 AY_{76} | — | January 8, 2002 | Socorro | LINEAR | · | 1.6 km | MPC · JPL |
| 219787 | 2002 AB_{83} | — | January 9, 2002 | Socorro | LINEAR | (5) | 1.7 km | MPC · JPL |
| 219788 | 2002 AN_{85} | — | January 9, 2002 | Socorro | LINEAR | (5) | 2.1 km | MPC · JPL |
| 219789 | 2002 AS_{85} | — | January 9, 2002 | Socorro | LINEAR | NEM | 3.2 km | MPC · JPL |
| 219790 | 2002 AD_{87} | — | January 9, 2002 | Socorro | LINEAR | (5) | 1.8 km | MPC · JPL |
| 219791 | 2002 AE_{95} | — | January 8, 2002 | Socorro | LINEAR | · | 2.8 km | MPC · JPL |
| 219792 | 2002 AZ_{100} | — | January 8, 2002 | Socorro | LINEAR | · | 1.5 km | MPC · JPL |
| 219793 | 2002 AM_{101} | — | January 8, 2002 | Socorro | LINEAR | · | 2.4 km | MPC · JPL |
| 219794 | 2002 AD_{104} | — | January 9, 2002 | Socorro | LINEAR | · | 2.7 km | MPC · JPL |
| 219795 | 2002 AK_{121} | — | January 9, 2002 | Socorro | LINEAR | · | 1.9 km | MPC · JPL |
| 219796 | 2002 AZ_{132} | — | January 8, 2002 | Socorro | LINEAR | · | 2.3 km | MPC · JPL |
| 219797 | 2002 AD_{133} | — | January 8, 2002 | Socorro | LINEAR | · | 2.3 km | MPC · JPL |
| 219798 | 2002 AW_{135} | — | January 9, 2002 | Socorro | LINEAR | · | 1.8 km | MPC · JPL |
| 219799 | 2002 AA_{142} | — | January 13, 2002 | Socorro | LINEAR | · | 2.6 km | MPC · JPL |
| 219800 | 2002 AD_{146} | — | January 13, 2002 | Socorro | LINEAR | · | 2.5 km | MPC · JPL |

== 219801–219900 ==
back to top

| Designation | | | Discovery | | | Properties | | Ref |
| Permanent | Provisional | Named after | Date | Site | Discoverer(s) | Category | Diam. | Ref |
|---|---|---|---|---|---|---|---|---|
| 219801 | 2002 AY_{146} | — | January 13, 2002 | Socorro | LINEAR | · | 1.7 km | MPC · JPL |
| 219802 | 2002 AC_{150} | — | January 14, 2002 | Socorro | LINEAR | · | 2.2 km | MPC · JPL |
| 219803 | 2002 AX_{151} | — | January 14, 2002 | Socorro | LINEAR | · | 2.5 km | MPC · JPL |
| 219804 | 2002 AF_{155} | — | January 14, 2002 | Socorro | LINEAR | · | 1.7 km | MPC · JPL |
| 219805 | 2002 AN_{157} | — | January 13, 2002 | Socorro | LINEAR | NEM | 3.0 km | MPC · JPL |
| 219806 | 2002 AZ_{163} | — | January 13, 2002 | Socorro | LINEAR | · | 3.7 km | MPC · JPL |
| 219807 | 2002 AO_{173} | — | January 14, 2002 | Socorro | LINEAR | · | 2.1 km | MPC · JPL |
| 219808 | 2002 AT_{180} | — | January 5, 2002 | Palomar | NEAT | MAR | 2.6 km | MPC · JPL |
| 219809 | 2002 AQ_{186} | — | January 8, 2002 | Socorro | LINEAR | EUN | 1.7 km | MPC · JPL |
| 219810 | 2002 AC_{187} | — | January 8, 2002 | Socorro | LINEAR | · | 3.0 km | MPC · JPL |
| 219811 | 2002 AF_{189} | — | January 10, 2002 | Palomar | NEAT | · | 2.6 km | MPC · JPL |
| 219812 | 2002 AM_{193} | — | January 12, 2002 | Kitt Peak | Spacewatch | NEM | 3.1 km | MPC · JPL |
| 219813 | 2002 AQ_{197} | — | January 14, 2002 | Palomar | NEAT | EUN | 2.2 km | MPC · JPL |
| 219814 | 2002 BA_{3} | — | January 18, 2002 | Anderson Mesa | LONEOS | JUN | 1.4 km | MPC · JPL |
| 219815 | 2002 BX_{4} | — | January 19, 2002 | Anderson Mesa | LONEOS | · | 3.4 km | MPC · JPL |
| 219816 | 2002 BD_{23} | — | January 23, 2002 | Socorro | LINEAR | · | 2.8 km | MPC · JPL |
| 219817 | 2002 BK_{23} | — | January 23, 2002 | Socorro | LINEAR | · | 1.6 km | MPC · JPL |
| 219818 | 2002 BN_{23} | — | January 23, 2002 | Socorro | LINEAR | · | 3.1 km | MPC · JPL |
| 219819 | 2002 BE_{24} | — | January 23, 2002 | Socorro | LINEAR | · | 2.8 km | MPC · JPL |
| 219820 | 2002 BD_{26} | — | January 26, 2002 | Socorro | LINEAR | BAR | 1.8 km | MPC · JPL |
| 219821 | 2002 BW_{26} | — | January 17, 2002 | Palomar | NEAT | · | 2.3 km | MPC · JPL |
| 219822 | 2002 CB_{4} | — | February 3, 2002 | Palomar | NEAT | · | 1.6 km | MPC · JPL |
| 219823 | 2002 CE_{17} | — | February 6, 2002 | Socorro | LINEAR | · | 3.5 km | MPC · JPL |
| 219824 | 2002 CH_{17} | — | February 6, 2002 | Socorro | LINEAR | · | 3.3 km | MPC · JPL |
| 219825 | 2002 CG_{20} | — | February 4, 2002 | Palomar | NEAT | · | 3.4 km | MPC · JPL |
| 219826 | 2002 CA_{28} | — | February 6, 2002 | Socorro | LINEAR | · | 2.6 km | MPC · JPL |
| 219827 | 2002 CQ_{35} | — | February 7, 2002 | Socorro | LINEAR | MRX | 1.4 km | MPC · JPL |
| 219828 | 2002 CW_{36} | — | February 7, 2002 | Socorro | LINEAR | · | 3.1 km | MPC · JPL |
| 219829 | 2002 CR_{39} | — | February 7, 2002 | San Marcello | L. Tesi, M. Tombelli | ADE | 3.1 km | MPC · JPL |
| 219830 | 2002 CB_{49} | — | February 3, 2002 | Haleakala | NEAT | · | 2.2 km | MPC · JPL |
| 219831 | 2002 CF_{56} | — | February 7, 2002 | Socorro | LINEAR | · | 3.6 km | MPC · JPL |
| 219832 | 2002 CB_{63} | — | February 6, 2002 | Socorro | LINEAR | · | 3.4 km | MPC · JPL |
| 219833 | 2002 CB_{80} | — | February 7, 2002 | Socorro | LINEAR | AST | 2.4 km | MPC · JPL |
| 219834 | 2002 CK_{80} | — | February 7, 2002 | Socorro | LINEAR | L4 | 10 km | MPC · JPL |
| 219835 | 2002 CH_{82} | — | February 7, 2002 | Socorro | LINEAR | L4 · (8060) | 10 km | MPC · JPL |
| 219836 | 2002 CW_{88} | — | February 7, 2002 | Socorro | LINEAR | · | 3.0 km | MPC · JPL |
| 219837 | 2002 CH_{109} | — | February 7, 2002 | Socorro | LINEAR | L4 | 10 km | MPC · JPL |
| 219838 | 2002 CG_{120} | — | February 7, 2002 | Socorro | LINEAR | · | 1.9 km | MPC · JPL |
| 219839 | 2002 CX_{120} | — | February 7, 2002 | Socorro | LINEAR | · | 3.0 km | MPC · JPL |
| 219840 | 2002 CJ_{130} | — | February 7, 2002 | Socorro | LINEAR | · | 2.2 km | MPC · JPL |
| 219841 | 2002 CJ_{136} | — | February 8, 2002 | Socorro | LINEAR | · | 1.6 km | MPC · JPL |
| 219842 | 2002 CY_{145} | — | February 9, 2002 | Socorro | LINEAR | · | 1.4 km | MPC · JPL |
| 219843 | 2002 CV_{147} | — | February 10, 2002 | Socorro | LINEAR | · | 2.8 km | MPC · JPL |
| 219844 | 2002 CQ_{148} | — | February 10, 2002 | Socorro | LINEAR | L4 | 10 km | MPC · JPL |
| 219845 | 2002 CZ_{178} | — | February 10, 2002 | Socorro | LINEAR | · | 1.7 km | MPC · JPL |
| 219846 | 2002 CL_{179} | — | February 10, 2002 | Socorro | LINEAR | · | 2.4 km | MPC · JPL |
| 219847 | 2002 CX_{198} | — | February 10, 2002 | Socorro | LINEAR | · | 2.6 km | MPC · JPL |
| 219848 | 2002 CO_{199} | — | February 10, 2002 | Socorro | LINEAR | · | 3.0 km | MPC · JPL |
| 219849 | 2002 CS_{204} | — | February 10, 2002 | Socorro | LINEAR | KOR | 1.8 km | MPC · JPL |
| 219850 | 2002 CA_{205} | — | February 10, 2002 | Socorro | LINEAR | · | 2.3 km | MPC · JPL |
| 219851 | 2002 CP_{210} | — | February 10, 2002 | Socorro | LINEAR | · | 2.7 km | MPC · JPL |
| 219852 | 2002 CL_{212} | — | February 10, 2002 | Socorro | LINEAR | · | 1.5 km | MPC · JPL |
| 219853 | 2002 CU_{212} | — | February 10, 2002 | Socorro | LINEAR | · | 2.8 km | MPC · JPL |
| 219854 | 2002 CS_{219} | — | February 10, 2002 | Socorro | LINEAR | · | 3.6 km | MPC · JPL |
| 219855 | 2002 CE_{220} | — | February 10, 2002 | Socorro | LINEAR | · | 2.6 km | MPC · JPL |
| 219856 | 2002 CN_{225} | — | February 8, 2002 | Palomar | NEAT | · | 2.4 km | MPC · JPL |
| 219857 | 2002 CB_{230} | — | February 11, 2002 | Kitt Peak | Spacewatch | L4 | 8.7 km | MPC · JPL |
| 219858 | 2002 CD_{232} | — | February 8, 2002 | Socorro | LINEAR | · | 2.3 km | MPC · JPL |
| 219859 | 2002 CX_{245} | — | February 14, 2002 | Haleakala | NEAT | · | 4.2 km | MPC · JPL |
| 219860 | 2002 CN_{246} | — | February 15, 2002 | Kitt Peak | Spacewatch | · | 3.2 km | MPC · JPL |
| 219861 Robertdecker | 2002 CP_{250} | Robertdecker | February 6, 2002 | Kitt Peak | M. W. Buie | KOR | 1.7 km | MPC · JPL |
| 219862 | 2002 CM_{251} | — | February 3, 2002 | Anderson Mesa | LONEOS | · | 2.8 km | MPC · JPL |
| 219863 | 2002 CV_{252} | — | February 4, 2002 | Anderson Mesa | LONEOS | · | 3.1 km | MPC · JPL |
| 219864 | 2002 CK_{254} | — | February 5, 2002 | Palomar | NEAT | AGN | 1.8 km | MPC · JPL |
| 219865 | 2002 CN_{254} | — | February 5, 2002 | Palomar | NEAT | · | 2.9 km | MPC · JPL |
| 219866 | 2002 CS_{266} | — | February 7, 2002 | Palomar | NEAT | L4 | 9.9 km | MPC · JPL |
| 219867 | 2002 CM_{270} | — | February 7, 2002 | Kitt Peak | Spacewatch | AGN | 1.3 km | MPC · JPL |
| 219868 | 2002 CV_{273} | — | February 8, 2002 | Kitt Peak | Spacewatch | · | 2.6 km | MPC · JPL |
| 219869 | 2002 CX_{277} | — | February 7, 2002 | Palomar | NEAT | AGN | 1.7 km | MPC · JPL |
| 219870 | 2002 CB_{283} | — | February 8, 2002 | Kitt Peak | Spacewatch | · | 2.8 km | MPC · JPL |
| 219871 | 2002 CC_{286} | — | February 10, 2002 | Socorro | LINEAR | · | 3.6 km | MPC · JPL |
| 219872 | 2002 CY_{301} | — | February 12, 2002 | Socorro | LINEAR | · | 2.5 km | MPC · JPL |
| 219873 | 2002 CG_{307} | — | February 8, 2002 | Socorro | LINEAR | · | 3.2 km | MPC · JPL |
| 219874 | 2002 CU_{314} | — | February 13, 2002 | Apache Point | SDSS | HOF | 2.8 km | MPC · JPL |
| 219875 | 2002 DX_{5} | — | February 16, 2002 | Palomar | NEAT | · | 1.9 km | MPC · JPL |
| 219876 | 2002 DK_{7} | — | February 19, 2002 | Socorro | LINEAR | EUN | 2.0 km | MPC · JPL |
| 219877 | 2002 DD_{15} | — | February 16, 2002 | Palomar | NEAT | HOF | 3.9 km | MPC · JPL |
| 219878 | 2002 EH_{2} | — | March 9, 2002 | Bohyunsan | Bohyunsan | KOR | 1.8 km | MPC · JPL |
| 219879 | 2002 ET_{4} | — | March 10, 2002 | Cima Ekar | ADAS | KOR | 1.6 km | MPC · JPL |
| 219880 | 2002 EO_{8} | — | March 11, 2002 | Cima Ekar | ADAS | EOS | 2.2 km | MPC · JPL |
| 219881 | 2002 ES_{32} | — | March 11, 2002 | Palomar | NEAT | L4 | 20 km | MPC · JPL |
| 219882 | 2002 EY_{36} | — | March 9, 2002 | Kitt Peak | Spacewatch | · | 2.8 km | MPC · JPL |
| 219883 | 2002 EB_{38} | — | March 10, 2002 | Kitt Peak | Spacewatch | KOR | 1.9 km | MPC · JPL |
| 219884 | 2002 EH_{49} | — | March 12, 2002 | Palomar | NEAT | · | 4.8 km | MPC · JPL |
| 219885 | 2002 EP_{58} | — | March 13, 2002 | Socorro | LINEAR | · | 3.2 km | MPC · JPL |
| 219886 | 2002 ER_{58} | — | March 13, 2002 | Socorro | LINEAR | · | 3.6 km | MPC · JPL |
| 219887 | 2002 EZ_{61} | — | March 13, 2002 | Socorro | LINEAR | · | 3.3 km | MPC · JPL |
| 219888 | 2002 EU_{64} | — | March 13, 2002 | Socorro | LINEAR | · | 2.9 km | MPC · JPL |
| 219889 | 2002 EJ_{66} | — | March 13, 2002 | Socorro | LINEAR | EOS | 2.9 km | MPC · JPL |
| 219890 | 2002 EO_{80} | — | March 12, 2002 | Palomar | NEAT | L4 | 10 km | MPC · JPL |
| 219891 | 2002 EK_{83} | — | March 13, 2002 | Palomar | NEAT | · | 6.0 km | MPC · JPL |
| 219892 | 2002 EF_{95} | — | March 14, 2002 | Socorro | LINEAR | L4 | 10 km | MPC · JPL |
| 219893 | 2002 EQ_{96} | — | March 11, 2002 | Kitt Peak | Spacewatch | · | 4.3 km | MPC · JPL |
| 219894 | 2002 EK_{108} | — | March 9, 2002 | Palomar | NEAT | · | 3.0 km | MPC · JPL |
| 219895 | 2002 EJ_{109} | — | March 9, 2002 | Kitt Peak | Spacewatch | · | 2.2 km | MPC · JPL |
| 219896 | 2002 EW_{111} | — | March 9, 2002 | Kitt Peak | Spacewatch | L4 | 10 km | MPC · JPL |
| 219897 | 2002 ET_{114} | — | March 10, 2002 | Kitt Peak | Spacewatch | L4 | 10 km | MPC · JPL |
| 219898 | 2002 ER_{118} | — | March 10, 2002 | Kitt Peak | Spacewatch | KOR | 2.2 km | MPC · JPL |
| 219899 | 2002 EH_{119} | — | March 10, 2002 | Kitt Peak | Spacewatch | · | 2.8 km | MPC · JPL |
| 219900 | 2002 ET_{125} | — | March 11, 2002 | Palomar | NEAT | · | 3.2 km | MPC · JPL |

== 219901–220000 ==
back to top

| Designation | | | Discovery | | | Properties | | Ref |
| Permanent | Provisional | Named after | Date | Site | Discoverer(s) | Category | Diam. | Ref |
|---|---|---|---|---|---|---|---|---|
| 219901 | 2002 EC_{132} | — | March 13, 2002 | Kitt Peak | Spacewatch | EOS | 2.3 km | MPC · JPL |
| 219902 | 2002 EG_{134} | — | March 13, 2002 | Palomar | NEAT | L4 | 10 km | MPC · JPL |
| 219903 | 2002 ES_{135} | — | March 14, 2002 | Anderson Mesa | LONEOS | · | 3.3 km | MPC · JPL |
| 219904 | 2002 EL_{136} | — | March 12, 2002 | Palomar | NEAT | KOR | 2.2 km | MPC · JPL |
| 219905 | 2002 ET_{140} | — | March 12, 2002 | Palomar | NEAT | L4 | 10 km | MPC · JPL |
| 219906 | 2002 ES_{148} | — | March 15, 2002 | Palomar | NEAT | · | 2.8 km | MPC · JPL |
| 219907 | 2002 EL_{160} | — | March 15, 2002 | Palomar | NEAT | L4 | 10 km | MPC · JPL |
| 219908 | 2002 ES_{161} | — | March 6, 2002 | Palomar | NEAT | L4 | 10 km | MPC · JPL |
| 219909 | 2002 FF_{8} | — | March 16, 2002 | Socorro | LINEAR | TIR | 4.6 km | MPC · JPL |
| 219910 | 2002 FX_{23} | — | March 18, 2002 | Kitt Peak | Spacewatch | · | 2.5 km | MPC · JPL |
| 219911 | 2002 FD_{25} | — | March 19, 2002 | Palomar | NEAT | · | 6.3 km | MPC · JPL |
| 219912 | 2002 FR_{41} | — | March 20, 2002 | Kitt Peak | Spacewatch | · | 4.1 km | MPC · JPL |
| 219913 | 2002 GE_{1} | — | April 3, 2002 | Drebach | G. Lehmann, J. Kandler | · | 3.9 km | MPC · JPL |
| 219914 | 2002 GX_{7} | — | April 14, 2002 | Desert Eagle | W. K. Y. Yeung | · | 980 m | MPC · JPL |
| 219915 | 2002 GB_{9} | — | April 14, 2002 | Desert Eagle | W. K. Y. Yeung | · | 2.8 km | MPC · JPL |
| 219916 | 2002 GZ_{13} | — | April 14, 2002 | Socorro | LINEAR | · | 4.9 km | MPC · JPL |
| 219917 | 2002 GP_{26} | — | April 8, 2002 | Palomar | NEAT | VER | 5.1 km | MPC · JPL |
| 219918 | 2002 GZ_{37} | — | April 3, 2002 | Kitt Peak | Spacewatch | THM | 3.0 km | MPC · JPL |
| 219919 | 2002 GA_{57} | — | April 8, 2002 | Kitt Peak | Spacewatch | · | 4.9 km | MPC · JPL |
| 219920 | 2002 GV_{61} | — | April 8, 2002 | Palomar | NEAT | EOS | 3.3 km | MPC · JPL |
| 219921 | 2002 GX_{65} | — | April 8, 2002 | Palomar | NEAT | EOS | 2.8 km | MPC · JPL |
| 219922 | 2002 GH_{66} | — | April 8, 2002 | Palomar | NEAT | LIX | 6.0 km | MPC · JPL |
| 219923 | 2002 GK_{71} | — | April 9, 2002 | Anderson Mesa | LONEOS | (13314) | 2.9 km | MPC · JPL |
| 219924 | 2002 GY_{71} | — | April 9, 2002 | Anderson Mesa | LONEOS | · | 4.3 km | MPC · JPL |
| 219925 | 2002 GB_{75} | — | April 9, 2002 | Palomar | NEAT | EOS | 3.2 km | MPC · JPL |
| 219926 | 2002 GZ_{76} | — | April 9, 2002 | Anderson Mesa | LONEOS | · | 3.7 km | MPC · JPL |
| 219927 | 2002 GK_{85} | — | April 10, 2002 | Socorro | LINEAR | · | 3.8 km | MPC · JPL |
| 219928 | 2002 GC_{87} | — | April 10, 2002 | Socorro | LINEAR | · | 5.3 km | MPC · JPL |
| 219929 | 2002 GZ_{90} | — | April 8, 2002 | Palomar | NEAT | THM | 3.3 km | MPC · JPL |
| 219930 | 2002 GO_{94} | — | April 9, 2002 | Socorro | LINEAR | · | 3.7 km | MPC · JPL |
| 219931 | 2002 GW_{94} | — | April 9, 2002 | Socorro | LINEAR | VER | 4.9 km | MPC · JPL |
| 219932 | 2002 GS_{96} | — | April 9, 2002 | Socorro | LINEAR | EOS | 3.4 km | MPC · JPL |
| 219933 | 2002 GF_{100} | — | April 10, 2002 | Socorro | LINEAR | · | 3.5 km | MPC · JPL |
| 219934 | 2002 GD_{109} | — | April 11, 2002 | Socorro | LINEAR | · | 4.2 km | MPC · JPL |
| 219935 | 2002 GH_{128} | — | April 12, 2002 | Socorro | LINEAR | · | 3.3 km | MPC · JPL |
| 219936 | 2002 GS_{131} | — | April 12, 2002 | Socorro | LINEAR | EOS | 2.8 km | MPC · JPL |
| 219937 | 2002 GQ_{132} | — | April 12, 2002 | Socorro | LINEAR | · | 710 m | MPC · JPL |
| 219938 | 2002 GY_{138} | — | April 13, 2002 | Palomar | NEAT | · | 3.3 km | MPC · JPL |
| 219939 | 2002 GN_{139} | — | April 13, 2002 | Palomar | NEAT | · | 3.3 km | MPC · JPL |
| 219940 | 2002 GD_{144} | — | April 11, 2002 | Socorro | LINEAR | EOS | 3.3 km | MPC · JPL |
| 219941 | 2002 GT_{145} | — | April 12, 2002 | Socorro | LINEAR | (5931) | 6.6 km | MPC · JPL |
| 219942 | 2002 GU_{145} | — | April 12, 2002 | Socorro | LINEAR | EOS | 3.1 km | MPC · JPL |
| 219943 | 2002 GS_{148} | — | April 14, 2002 | Socorro | LINEAR | · | 2.6 km | MPC · JPL |
| 219944 | 2002 GZ_{148} | — | April 14, 2002 | Palomar | NEAT | HYG | 4.9 km | MPC · JPL |
| 219945 | 2002 GN_{150} | — | April 14, 2002 | Socorro | LINEAR | · | 3.1 km | MPC · JPL |
| 219946 | 2002 GP_{158} | — | April 13, 2002 | Palomar | NEAT | EOS | 3.9 km | MPC · JPL |
| 219947 | 2002 GC_{160} | — | April 14, 2002 | Palomar | NEAT | · | 4.7 km | MPC · JPL |
| 219948 | 2002 GX_{164} | — | April 14, 2002 | Palomar | NEAT | · | 3.3 km | MPC · JPL |
| 219949 | 2002 GR_{167} | — | April 9, 2002 | Socorro | LINEAR | · | 4.6 km | MPC · JPL |
| 219950 | 2002 GA_{168} | — | April 9, 2002 | Socorro | LINEAR | · | 5.5 km | MPC · JPL |
| 219951 | 2002 GF_{173} | — | April 10, 2002 | Socorro | LINEAR | · | 3.1 km | MPC · JPL |
| 219952 | 2002 GA_{174} | — | April 10, 2002 | Socorro | LINEAR | · | 4.9 km | MPC · JPL |
| 219953 | 2002 GB_{180} | — | April 8, 2002 | Palomar | NEAT | EOS | 2.9 km | MPC · JPL |
| 219954 | 2002 GL_{184} | — | April 5, 2002 | Palomar | NEAT | L4 | 10 km | MPC · JPL |
| 219955 | 2002 HB_{1} | — | April 16, 2002 | Socorro | LINEAR | · | 4.3 km | MPC · JPL |
| 219956 | 2002 HM_{17} | — | April 21, 2002 | Kitt Peak | Spacewatch | · | 5.3 km | MPC · JPL |
| 219957 | 2002 JZ_{4} | — | May 5, 2002 | Desert Eagle | W. K. Y. Yeung | · | 3.7 km | MPC · JPL |
| 219958 | 2002 JG_{16} | — | May 9, 2002 | Nogales | Tenagra II | L4 | 17 km | MPC · JPL |
| 219959 | 2002 JC_{20} | — | May 6, 2002 | Palomar | NEAT | · | 5.2 km | MPC · JPL |
| 219960 | 2002 JD_{54} | — | May 9, 2002 | Socorro | LINEAR | · | 5.3 km | MPC · JPL |
| 219961 | 2002 JP_{60} | — | May 10, 2002 | Palomar | NEAT | EOS | 3.8 km | MPC · JPL |
| 219962 | 2002 JM_{72} | — | May 8, 2002 | Socorro | LINEAR | · | 5.7 km | MPC · JPL |
| 219963 | 2002 JO_{84} | — | May 11, 2002 | Socorro | LINEAR | · | 840 m | MPC · JPL |
| 219964 | 2002 JE_{85} | — | May 11, 2002 | Socorro | LINEAR | · | 5.3 km | MPC · JPL |
| 219965 | 2002 JG_{85} | — | May 11, 2002 | Socorro | LINEAR | THM | 3.1 km | MPC · JPL |
| 219966 | 2002 JP_{86} | — | May 11, 2002 | Socorro | LINEAR | VER | 4.8 km | MPC · JPL |
| 219967 | 2002 JX_{93} | — | May 11, 2002 | Socorro | LINEAR | · | 6.3 km | MPC · JPL |
| 219968 | 2002 JC_{95} | — | May 11, 2002 | Socorro | LINEAR | · | 5.3 km | MPC · JPL |
| 219969 | 2002 JB_{108} | — | May 14, 2002 | Palomar | NEAT | · | 6.0 km | MPC · JPL |
| 219970 | 2002 JR_{116} | — | May 4, 2002 | Palomar | NEAT | · | 5.0 km | MPC · JPL |
| 219971 | 2002 JC_{119} | — | May 5, 2002 | Anderson Mesa | LONEOS | TIR | 3.8 km | MPC · JPL |
| 219972 | 2002 JL_{119} | — | May 5, 2002 | Kitt Peak | Spacewatch | EOS | 2.9 km | MPC · JPL |
| 219973 | 2002 JU_{128} | — | May 7, 2002 | Palomar | NEAT | · | 750 m | MPC · JPL |
| 219974 | 2002 JM_{137} | — | May 9, 2002 | Palomar | NEAT | THM | 2.8 km | MPC · JPL |
| 219975 | 2002 KA_{11} | — | May 16, 2002 | Haleakala | NEAT | · | 5.2 km | MPC · JPL |
| 219976 | 2002 LD | — | June 1, 2002 | Palomar | NEAT | · | 5.4 km | MPC · JPL |
| 219977 | 2002 LM_{2} | — | June 2, 2002 | Anderson Mesa | LONEOS | · | 1.0 km | MPC · JPL |
| 219978 | 2002 LC_{22} | — | June 8, 2002 | Socorro | LINEAR | · | 2.8 km | MPC · JPL |
| 219979 | 2002 LT_{23} | — | June 8, 2002 | Socorro | LINEAR | · | 1.2 km | MPC · JPL |
| 219980 | 2002 LH_{37} | — | June 10, 2002 | Socorro | LINEAR | PHO | 2.6 km | MPC · JPL |
| 219981 | 2002 LL_{49} | — | June 6, 2002 | Haleakala | NEAT | · | 4.9 km | MPC · JPL |
| 219982 | 2002 LE_{50} | — | June 8, 2002 | Socorro | LINEAR | · | 1.1 km | MPC · JPL |
| 219983 Yangtongyu | 2002 LU_{61} | Yangtongyu | June 1, 2002 | Palomar | NEAT | fast | 720 m | MPC · JPL |
| 219984 | 2002 NJ_{23} | — | July 9, 2002 | Socorro | LINEAR | · | 970 m | MPC · JPL |
| 219985 | 2002 NO_{34} | — | July 9, 2002 | Socorro | LINEAR | · | 1.1 km | MPC · JPL |
| 219986 | 2002 NY_{42} | — | July 15, 2002 | Palomar | NEAT | · | 890 m | MPC · JPL |
| 219987 | 2002 NE_{44} | — | July 11, 2002 | Campo Imperatore | CINEOS | · | 5.9 km | MPC · JPL |
| 219988 | 2002 NA_{46} | — | July 13, 2002 | Palomar | NEAT | · | 900 m | MPC · JPL |
| 219989 | 2002 NK_{52} | — | July 14, 2002 | Palomar | NEAT | · | 850 m | MPC · JPL |
| 219990 | 2002 NN_{64} | — | July 2, 2002 | Palomar | NEAT | · | 1.1 km | MPC · JPL |
| 219991 | 2002 NC_{65} | — | July 9, 2002 | Palomar | NEAT | · | 900 m | MPC · JPL |
| 219992 | 2002 OO_{4} | — | July 18, 2002 | Palomar | NEAT | NYS | 820 m | MPC · JPL |
| 219993 | 2002 OL_{13} | — | July 18, 2002 | Socorro | LINEAR | · | 1.1 km | MPC · JPL |
| 219994 | 2002 OJ_{18} | — | July 18, 2002 | Socorro | LINEAR | · | 870 m | MPC · JPL |
| 219995 | 2002 PP_{12} | — | August 5, 2002 | Palomar | NEAT | · | 970 m | MPC · JPL |
| 219996 | 2002 PV_{13} | — | August 6, 2002 | Palomar | NEAT | · | 990 m | MPC · JPL |
| 219997 | 2002 PL_{16} | — | August 6, 2002 | Palomar | NEAT | · | 800 m | MPC · JPL |
| 219998 | 2002 PG_{23} | — | August 6, 2002 | Palomar | NEAT | V | 800 m | MPC · JPL |
| 219999 | 2002 PP_{26} | — | August 6, 2002 | Palomar | NEAT | (2076) | 730 m | MPC · JPL |
| 220000 | 2002 PQ_{30} | — | August 6, 2002 | Palomar | NEAT | · | 740 m | MPC · JPL |

back to top

== See also ==
- Meanings of minor-planet names: 219001–220000
