= Meanings of minor-planet names: 217001–218000 =

As minor planet discoveries are confirmed, they are given a permanent number by the IAU's Minor Planet Center (MPC), and the discoverers can then submit names for them, following the IAU's naming conventions. The list below concerns those minor planets in the specified number-range that have received names, and explains the meanings of those names.

Official naming citations of newly named small Solar System bodies are approved and published in a bulletin by IAU's Working Group for Small Bodies Nomenclature (WGSBN). Before May 2021, citations were published in MPC's Minor Planet Circulars for many decades. Recent citations can also be found on the JPL Small-Body Database (SBDB). Until his death in 2016, German astronomer Lutz D. Schmadel compiled these citations into the Dictionary of Minor Planet Names (DMP) and regularly updated the collection.

Based on Paul Herget's The Names of the Minor Planets, Schmadel also researched the unclear origin of numerous asteroids, most of which had been named prior to World War II. This article incorporates text from this source, which is in the public domain: SBDB New namings may only be added to this list below after official publication as the preannouncement of names is condemned. The WGSBN publishes a comprehensive guideline for the naming rules of non-cometary small Solar System bodies.

== 217001–217100 ==
Named minor planet	Provisional	This minor planet was named for...	Ref · Catalog
There are no named minor planets in this number range

== 217101–217200 ==
back to top

Named minor planet	Provisional	This minor planet was named for...	Ref · Catalog
217124 Michaelsalinas	2002 CQ_{262}	Michael J. Salinas (b. 1995), an American engineer at KinetX Aerospace.	IAU · 217124

== 217201–217300 ==
back to top

Named minor planet	Provisional	This minor planet was named for...	Ref · Catalog
217257 Valemangano	2003 WU_{26}	Valeria Mangano (born 1971), a planetary scientist at the Istituto di Fisica dello Spazio Interplanetario in Turin.	JPL · 217257

== 217301–217400 ==
back to top

Named minor planet	Provisional	This minor planet was named for...	Ref · Catalog
217366 Mayalin	2004 TW_{49}	Maya Lin (born 1959) designed the Vietnam Veterans Memorial in Washington, D.C. (1980–1982) and the Civil Rights Memorial (1988–1989) in Montgomery, Alabama, along with many other monuments and works of art. For a time, she created artificial "asteroids" out of her daughters' discarded toys.	JPL · 217366
217398 Tihany	2005 GC_{22}	Tihany, a historic village on the northern shore of Lake Balaton on the Tihany Peninsula.	JPL · 217398

== 217401–217500 ==
back to top

Named minor planet	Provisional	This minor planet was named for...	Ref · Catalog
217420 Olevsk	2005 QW_{148}	Olevsk, an ancient city founded in the times of Kievan Rus.	JPL · 217420
217472 Addams	2005 WV_{105}	Charles Addams, American cartoonist who created the characters for the 1960s sitcom The Addams Family.	IAU · 217472
217492 Howardtaylor	2006 HG_{127}	Howard W. Taylor (b. 1969) is an American electrical engineer from Johns Hopkins University Applied Physics Laboratory.	IAU · 217492

== 217501–217600 ==
back to top

Named minor planet	Provisional	This minor planet was named for...	Ref · Catalog
217510 Dewaldroode	2006 TY_{111}	Dewald Roode (1940–2009), a South African physicist, mathematician and computer scientist.	JPL · 217510
217576 Klausbirkner	2007 YX_{56}	Klaus Birkner (born 1959), a long-time amateur astronomer and co-founder of the AAEM Observatory near Velbert, Germany.	JPL · 217576

== 217601–217700 ==
back to top

Named minor planet	Provisional	This minor planet was named for...	Ref · Catalog
217603 Grove Creek	2008 JW_{20}	Grove Creek Observatory, a professional research facility located at Trunkey Creek, New South Wales, Australia.	JPL · 217603
217628 Lugh	1990 HA	Lugh (or Lugus), the Celtic God of the Sun and light.	JPL · 217628

== 217701–217800 ==
back to top

Named minor planet	Provisional	This minor planet was named for...	Ref · Catalog
217726 Kitabeppu	1999 WN	Manabu Kitabeppu (born 1957), born in Kagoshima prefecture, is a retired Japanese baseball player who played for the Hiroshima Toyo Carp. Famous for excellent ball control, Kitabeppu got 213 wins and 1757 strikeouts during his nineteen-year career as a starting pitcher.	IAU · 217726

== 217801–217900 ==
back to top

Named minor planet	Provisional	This minor planet was named for...	Ref · Catalog
There are no named minor planets in this number range

== 217901–218000 ==
back to top

Named minor planet	Provisional	This minor planet was named for...	Ref · Catalog
There are no named minor planets in this number range

back to top

Preceded by 216,001–217,000	Meanings of minor-planet names List of minor planets: 217,001–218,000	Succeeded by 218,001–219,000
