= Grove Creek Observatory =

Astronomical observatory in Australia

- Observatory code: E16
- Location: New South Wales, AUS
- Coordinates: 33°49′47″S 149°22′01″E
- Established: 1985
- Website: www.gco.org.au
- Location of Grove Creek Observatory

Grove Creek Observatory is an astronomical observatory in Trunkey Creek, New South Wales, Australia. The site also hosts remote-controlled telescopes in three separate enclosings. It is located about four hours' drive from Sydney, Australia. It is run by Jim Lynch and Greg Ford.

It is a non-profit research facility which also hosts one of the few privately owned radio telescopes in Australia. The Small Radio Telescope (SRT) is owned and operated by Andrew Mattingly and Greg Ford of Sydney and operates at the 21 cm (1420Mhz) spin flip line of atomic hydrogen. It is extensively used for southern hemisphere research by the Institute for Theoretical Physics and Astrophysics in Kiel, Germany.

Asteroid 217603 Grove Creek, discovered by Italian amateur astronomer Fabrizio Tozzi at Grove Creek in 2008, was named after the observatory. The official naming citation was published by the Minor Planet Center on 30 January 2010 (M.P.C. 68450). And in 2010, a small asteroid named 2010 AL30 was discovered there.

== See also ==
- List of astronomical observatories
