= Dewald Roode =

South African computer scientist

- Born: 16 July 1940
- Died: 27 September 2009 (aged 69)
- Occupation: Information Systems

Johannes Dewald Roode (July 16, 1940 – Sept 27, 2009) was a South African academic and Professor at the University of Pretoria, specializing in Information Systems research.

== Biography ==
Dewald Roode received a B.A. in theoretical physics, an M.A. in mathematics from the University of Potchefstroom in South Africa, another in physics from the same institute, and a PhD in operations research under the supervision of Guus Zoutendijk at the University of Leiden.

In 1988 Roode was appointed to head the new Department of Informatics at the University of Pretoria, while continuing on a part-time basis with consultancy work. Within five years of starting, the Department of Informatics at the University of Pretoria was internationally known, and welcomed a regular stream of international visitors who contributed tremendously to the continued development of the Department.

After his early retirement in 2001, Roode was a visiting professor in the Department of Information Systems at the University of Cape Town from 2003 till his death in 2009, and also at the Cape Peninsula University of Technology since 2004. Apart from his continued academic involvement with various universities, he completed a six-year term in 2007 as chair of Technical Committee 8 on Information Systems of the International Federation for Information Processing (IFIP), and was a member of the Steering Committee of IFIP’s World Information Technology Forum in Lithuania in 2003 and in Botswana in 2005. In 2008, he developed and presented a series of 14 seminars on research and innovation core skills for the South African Council for Scientific and Industrial Research (CSIR). Roode supervised more than 30 doctoral students to completion.

He was the recipient of the 2008 Association for Information Systems Leo Award for exceptional lifetime achievement in the Information Systems discipline. In 2008 Dewald Roode was also honoured by the International Federation for Information Processing (IFIP) with the highest accolade for service, the Silver Core.

== Work ==
His work embraced antipositivism since the positivist paradigm had failed to embrace the complexities inherent in african academic research. To share his insight, Roode exercised an early retirement option from the University of Pretoria in 2001 enabling him to work at different universities, and to devote more time to the high-level training of individuals in the computer industry who had not had the opportunity to receive formal tertiary education.

He published widely on the sociotechno divide in society and more broadly on the Information Systems discipline.

== See also ==
- 217510 Dewaldroode, asteroid

== Publications, a selection ==
- 1968. Generalized Lagrangian functions in mathematical programming
- 1972. Modelle, rekenaars en werklikheid
- 2008. Advances in Information Systems Research, Education and Practice: Ifip 20th World Computer Congress, Tc 8, Information Systems, September 7–10, 2008, Milano, Italy. David Avison, George M. Kasper, Barbara Pernici, Isabel Ramos, Dewald Roode. Springer, 2008.
