= Trunkey Creek, New South Wales =

Coordinates: 33°49′S 149°20′E

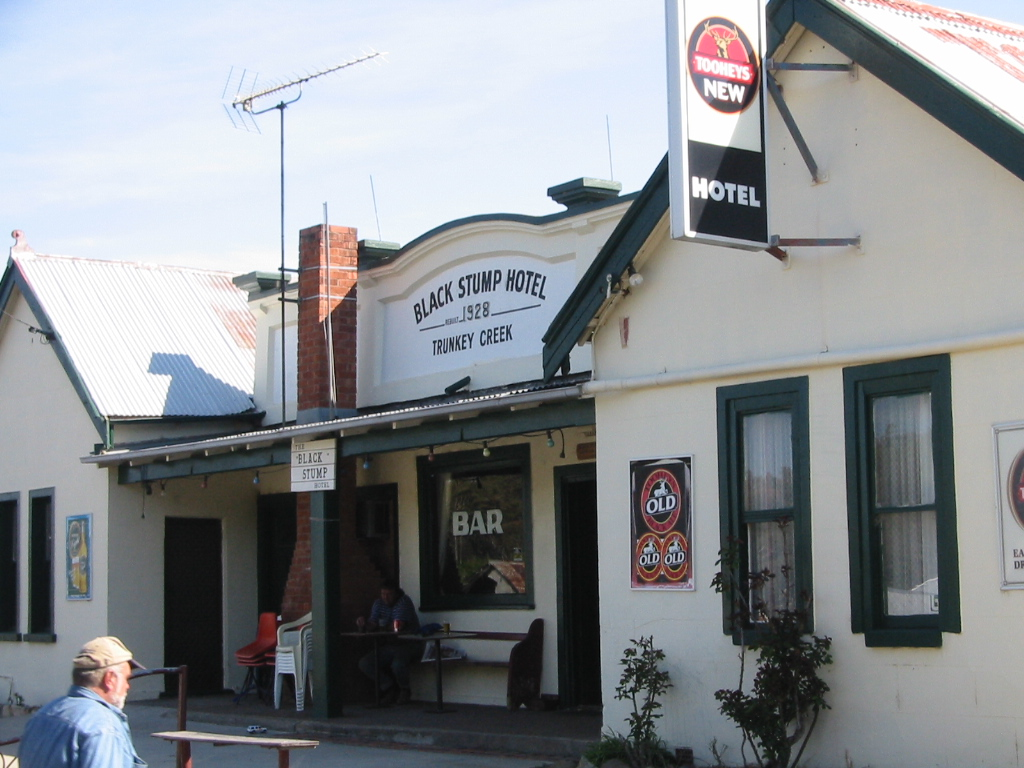
The Black Stump Hotel

Trunkey Creek is a rural village located in the Central West of New South Wales, Australia in Bathurst Regional Council. It is about 55 kilometres (34 mi) south of the city of Bathurst and about 130 kilometres (81 mi) north of the city of Goulburn on the Bathurst Goulburn Road. At the 2021 census, Trunkey Creek had a population of 118, almost unchanged from the figure of 122 at the 2006 census.

During the gold rush of 1851, sparked by Edward Hargraves' announcement that there was payable gold to be found at the junction of the Abercrombie River and Grove Creek near the village, its population is reputed to have swelled to 2500. The rivers near the village continue to provide gold for hobbyists and prospectors.

The village is said to have received its name from a prospector who had a particularly large nose and was given the nickname Trunkey. Although the village had received the official name of Arthur, the creek that the prospector was working on became known as Trunkey's Creek and the village — although officially called Arthur — was referred to as Trunkey Creek until it changed its name in 1988.

The town is endowed with a police station and courthouse built in 1879. The police station is still staffed today. The Golden Age Hotel built in 1869 still stands today, as does the original general store of 1879 and the Black Stump Hotel (originally the Commercial Hotel) which although destroyed by fire in 1928 was rebuilt and continues to serve the public.

On 2 March 2007, Local Gun Shearer Brett Molly set the world 24-hour shearing record by shearing 845 full wool Alpacas. It was the first time a record has been set in 24-hour Alpaca shearing. However, for the record to be officially recognised, it needs to be overseen by the World Shearing Records Committee. Brett was the only person to witness the event.

== Landmarks ==
- Abercrombie Caves, a major geological tourist attraction is situated very close to the town.
- Mulgunnia, colonial homestead
- Grove Creek Observatory
