= List of minor planets: 217001–218000 =

The following is a partial list of minor planets, running from minor-planet number 217001 through 218000, inclusive. The primary data for this and other partial lists is based on JPL's "Small-Body Orbital Elements" and data available from the Minor Planet Center. Critical list information is also provided by the MPC, unless otherwise specified from Lowell Observatory. A detailed description of the table's columns and additional sources are given on the main page including a complete list of every page in this series, and a statistical break-up on the dynamical classification of minor planets.

Also see the summary list of all named bodies in numerical and alphabetical order, and the corresponding naming citations for the number range of this particular list. New namings may only be added to this list after official publication, as the preannouncement of names is condemned by the Working Group for Small Bodies Nomenclature of the International Astronomical Union.

Near-Earth obj.	MBA (inner)	MBA (outer)	Centaur
Mars-crosser	MBA (middle)	Jupiter trojan	Trans-Neptunian obj.
Unclassified

== 217001–217100 ==
Designation			Discovery			Properties		Ref
Permanent	Provisional	Named after	Date	Site	Discoverer(s)	Category	Diam.	Ref
217001	2000 SX_{102}	—	September 24, 2000	Socorro	LINEAR	DOR	3.0 km	MPC · JPL
217002	2000 SQ_{130}	—	September 22, 2000	Socorro	LINEAR	·	3.9 km	MPC · JPL
217003	2000 SC_{137}	—	September 23, 2000	Socorro	LINEAR	·	3.2 km	MPC · JPL
217004	2000 SX_{153}	—	September 24, 2000	Socorro	LINEAR	·	3.2 km	MPC · JPL
217005	2000 SG_{254}	—	September 24, 2000	Socorro	LINEAR	AGN	2.0 km	MPC · JPL
217006	2000 UU_{78}	—	October 24, 2000	Socorro	LINEAR	(5)	3.1 km	MPC · JPL
217007	2000 WG_{39}	—	November 20, 2000	Socorro	LINEAR	THB	5.1 km	MPC · JPL
217008	2000 WQ_{127}	—	November 17, 2000	Kitt Peak	Spacewatch	·	2.4 km	MPC · JPL
217009	2000 XG_{4}	—	December 1, 2000	Socorro	LINEAR	ADE	3.2 km	MPC · JPL
217010	2000 XC_{19}	—	December 4, 2000	Socorro	LINEAR	·	7.3 km	MPC · JPL
217011	2000 YN_{50}	—	December 30, 2000	Socorro	LINEAR	·	2.1 km	MPC · JPL
217012	2000 YT_{56}	—	December 30, 2000	Socorro	LINEAR	·	4.7 km	MPC · JPL
217013	2001 AA_{50}	—	January 4, 2001	Socorro	LINEAR	AMO	620 m	MPC · JPL
217014	2001 BX_{1}	—	January 16, 2001	Haleakala	NEAT	·	3.5 km	MPC · JPL
217015	2001 BW_{31}	—	January 20, 2001	Socorro	LINEAR	·	6.3 km	MPC · JPL
217016	2001 BQ_{54}	—	January 18, 2001	Haleakala	NEAT	·	2.8 km	MPC · JPL
217017	2001 DN_{49}	—	February 16, 2001	Socorro	LINEAR	·	2.1 km	MPC · JPL
217018	2001 FW_{186}	—	March 18, 2001	Anderson Mesa	LONEOS	NYS	1.4 km	MPC · JPL
217019	2001 KP_{5}	—	May 17, 2001	Socorro	LINEAR	·	1.8 km	MPC · JPL
217020	2001 KS_{5}	—	May 17, 2001	Socorro	LINEAR	NYS	2.2 km	MPC · JPL
217021	2001 KH_{51}	—	May 24, 2001	Socorro	LINEAR	PHO	2.3 km	MPC · JPL
217022	2001 KE_{75}	—	May 29, 2001	Haleakala	NEAT	·	1.9 km	MPC · JPL
217023	2001 MV_{16}	—	June 27, 2001	Palomar	NEAT	HIL · 3:2	9.0 km	MPC · JPL
217024	2001 NJ_{14}	—	July 14, 2001	Haleakala	NEAT	T_{j} (2.98) · 3:2	8.2 km	MPC · JPL
217025	2001 OK_{14}	—	July 20, 2001	Socorro	LINEAR	·	2.0 km	MPC · JPL
217026	2001 OB_{56}	—	July 23, 2001	Palomar	NEAT	·	1.9 km	MPC · JPL
217027	2001 OJ_{56}	—	July 26, 2001	Palomar	NEAT	H	980 m	MPC · JPL
217028	2001 OK_{80}	—	July 29, 2001	Palomar	NEAT	·	1.7 km	MPC · JPL
217029	2001 OS_{91}	—	July 31, 2001	Palomar	NEAT	MAR	1.4 km	MPC · JPL
217030	2001 OZ_{97}	—	July 25, 2001	Haleakala	NEAT	·	1.3 km	MPC · JPL
217031	2001 OM_{111}	—	July 21, 2001	Kitt Peak	Spacewatch	PHO	1.3 km	MPC · JPL
217032	2001 PJ_{4}	—	August 7, 2001	Haleakala	NEAT	HIL · 3:2	9.0 km	MPC · JPL
217033	2001 PM_{27}	—	August 11, 2001	Haleakala	NEAT	·	1.4 km	MPC · JPL
217034	2001 PM_{57}	—	August 14, 2001	Haleakala	NEAT	(5)	2.1 km	MPC · JPL
217035	2001 PT_{62}	—	August 13, 2001	Haleakala	NEAT	·	1.9 km	MPC · JPL
217036	2001 QO_{4}	—	August 16, 2001	Socorro	LINEAR	·	1.5 km	MPC · JPL
217037	2001 QE_{11}	—	August 16, 2001	Socorro	LINEAR	·	1.2 km	MPC · JPL
217038	2001 QB_{39}	—	August 16, 2001	Socorro	LINEAR	·	1.3 km	MPC · JPL
217039	2001 QK_{43}	—	August 16, 2001	Socorro	LINEAR	3:2 · SHU	8.3 km	MPC · JPL
217040	2001 QT_{102}	—	August 19, 2001	Socorro	LINEAR	H	920 m	MPC · JPL
217041	2001 QH_{114}	—	August 17, 2001	Socorro	LINEAR	(5)	1.5 km	MPC · JPL
217042	2001 QT_{126}	—	August 20, 2001	Socorro	LINEAR	·	1.6 km	MPC · JPL
217043	2001 QC_{132}	—	August 20, 2001	Socorro	LINEAR	·	1.8 km	MPC · JPL
217044	2001 QA_{136}	—	August 22, 2001	Socorro	LINEAR	(5)	2.1 km	MPC · JPL
217045	2001 QM_{147}	—	August 20, 2001	Palomar	NEAT	·	2.3 km	MPC · JPL
217046	2001 QE_{152}	—	August 26, 2001	Socorro	LINEAR	·	3.1 km	MPC · JPL
217047	2001 QX_{189}	—	August 22, 2001	Socorro	LINEAR	EUN ·	1.8 km	MPC · JPL
217048	2001 QZ_{189}	—	August 22, 2001	Socorro	LINEAR	·	2.6 km	MPC · JPL
217049	2001 QX_{191}	—	August 22, 2001	Socorro	LINEAR	·	2.4 km	MPC · JPL
217050	2001 QT_{203}	—	August 23, 2001	Anderson Mesa	LONEOS	MAR	1.7 km	MPC · JPL
217051	2001 QP_{234}	—	August 24, 2001	Socorro	LINEAR	·	1.5 km	MPC · JPL
217052	2001 QK_{243}	—	August 24, 2001	Socorro	LINEAR	MAR	1.8 km	MPC · JPL
217053	2001 QO_{248}	—	August 24, 2001	Socorro	LINEAR	·	1.7 km	MPC · JPL
217054	2001 QY_{260}	—	August 25, 2001	Socorro	LINEAR	·	1.2 km	MPC · JPL
217055	2001 QZ_{264}	—	August 26, 2001	Socorro	LINEAR	·	1.8 km	MPC · JPL
217056	2001 QZ_{280}	—	August 19, 2001	Socorro	LINEAR	EUN	2.3 km	MPC · JPL
217057	2001 RF_{37}	—	September 8, 2001	Socorro	LINEAR	(5)	1.3 km	MPC · JPL
217058	2001 RU_{53}	—	September 12, 2001	Socorro	LINEAR	·	1.5 km	MPC · JPL
217059	2001 RK_{75}	—	September 10, 2001	Socorro	LINEAR	(5)	1.4 km	MPC · JPL
217060	2001 RP_{95}	—	September 12, 2001	Socorro	LINEAR	PHO	3.4 km	MPC · JPL
217061	2001 RE_{119}	—	September 12, 2001	Socorro	LINEAR	·	1.4 km	MPC · JPL
217062	2001 RS_{123}	—	September 12, 2001	Socorro	LINEAR	(5)	1.7 km	MPC · JPL
217063	2001 RF_{134}	—	September 12, 2001	Socorro	LINEAR	·	1.8 km	MPC · JPL
217064	2001 SM_{12}	—	September 16, 2001	Socorro	LINEAR	·	1.8 km	MPC · JPL
217065	2001 SO_{30}	—	September 16, 2001	Socorro	LINEAR	(5)	1.9 km	MPC · JPL
217066	2001 SB_{50}	—	September 16, 2001	Socorro	LINEAR	(5)	1.8 km	MPC · JPL
217067	2001 SA_{67}	—	September 17, 2001	Socorro	LINEAR	·	1.7 km	MPC · JPL
217068	2001 SW_{68}	—	September 17, 2001	Socorro	LINEAR	(5)	1.9 km	MPC · JPL
217069	2001 SQ_{107}	—	September 20, 2001	Socorro	LINEAR	·	2.7 km	MPC · JPL
217070	2001 SS_{127}	—	September 16, 2001	Socorro	LINEAR	·	1.2 km	MPC · JPL
217071	2001 SN_{142}	—	September 16, 2001	Socorro	LINEAR	·	1.5 km	MPC · JPL
217072	2001 SD_{264}	—	September 24, 2001	Socorro	LINEAR	(194)	2.1 km	MPC · JPL
217073	2001 SB_{276}	—	September 26, 2001	Socorro	LINEAR	·	3.1 km	MPC · JPL
217074	2001 SE_{276}	—	September 26, 2001	Socorro	LINEAR	H	1.0 km	MPC · JPL
217075	2001 SR_{289}	—	September 29, 2001	Palomar	NEAT	ADE ·	2.8 km	MPC · JPL
217076	2001 SW_{322}	—	September 25, 2001	Socorro	LINEAR	·	2.2 km	MPC · JPL
217077	2001 TT_{34}	—	October 14, 2001	Socorro	LINEAR	ADE	3.5 km	MPC · JPL
217078	2001 TF_{38}	—	October 14, 2001	Socorro	LINEAR	·	3.7 km	MPC · JPL
217079	2001 TJ_{57}	—	October 13, 2001	Socorro	LINEAR	·	1.5 km	MPC · JPL
217080	2001 TG_{79}	—	October 13, 2001	Socorro	LINEAR	·	3.0 km	MPC · JPL
217081	2001 TV_{120}	—	October 15, 2001	Socorro	LINEAR	·	2.4 km	MPC · JPL
217082	2001 TP_{126}	—	October 13, 2001	Kitt Peak	Spacewatch	·	1.5 km	MPC · JPL
217083	2001 TE_{132}	—	October 11, 2001	Palomar	NEAT	·	1.5 km	MPC · JPL
217084	2001 TK_{134}	—	October 12, 2001	Haleakala	NEAT	·	2.0 km	MPC · JPL
217085	2001 TH_{236}	—	October 15, 2001	Palomar	NEAT	RAF	1.3 km	MPC · JPL
217086	2001 TS_{240}	—	October 14, 2001	Socorro	LINEAR	·	2.3 km	MPC · JPL
217087	2001 UA_{78}	—	October 20, 2001	Socorro	LINEAR	KON	2.8 km	MPC · JPL
217088	2001 UO_{114}	—	October 22, 2001	Socorro	LINEAR	·	2.0 km	MPC · JPL
217089	2001 VZ_{18}	—	November 9, 2001	Socorro	LINEAR	ADE	2.7 km	MPC · JPL
217090	2001 VD_{44}	—	November 9, 2001	Socorro	LINEAR	EUN	2.1 km	MPC · JPL
217091	2001 VX_{56}	—	November 10, 2001	Socorro	LINEAR	RAF	1.7 km	MPC · JPL
217092	2001 VY_{64}	—	November 10, 2001	Socorro	LINEAR	·	2.4 km	MPC · JPL
217093	2001 VD_{75}	—	November 10, 2001	Palomar	NEAT	·	4.4 km	MPC · JPL
217094	2001 VY_{91}	—	November 15, 2001	Socorro	LINEAR	·	2.6 km	MPC · JPL
217095	2001 VO_{107}	—	November 12, 2001	Socorro	LINEAR	·	1.6 km	MPC · JPL
217096	2001 VX_{122}	—	November 11, 2001	Anderson Mesa	LONEOS	·	11 km	MPC · JPL
217097	2001 WA_{33}	—	November 17, 2001	Socorro	LINEAR	·	2.4 km	MPC · JPL
217098	2001 WH_{39}	—	November 17, 2001	Socorro	LINEAR	·	3.2 km	MPC · JPL
217099	2001 WH_{69}	—	November 20, 2001	Socorro	LINEAR	·	2.0 km	MPC · JPL
217100	2001 XQ_{9}	—	December 9, 2001	Socorro	LINEAR	·	2.4 km	MPC · JPL

== 217101–217200 ==
back to top

Designation			Discovery			Properties		Ref
Permanent	Provisional	Named after	Date	Site	Discoverer(s)	Category	Diam.	Ref
217101	2001 XM_{29}	—	December 11, 2001	Socorro	LINEAR	(5)	2.5 km	MPC · JPL
217102	2001 XM_{47}	—	December 9, 2001	Socorro	LINEAR	·	3.1 km	MPC · JPL
217103	2001 XV_{67}	—	December 10, 2001	Socorro	LINEAR	ADE	4.8 km	MPC · JPL
217104	2001 XD_{72}	—	December 11, 2001	Socorro	LINEAR	·	2.1 km	MPC · JPL
217105	2001 XS_{95}	—	December 10, 2001	Socorro	LINEAR	·	2.0 km	MPC · JPL
217106	2001 XG_{96}	—	December 10, 2001	Socorro	LINEAR	·	2.1 km	MPC · JPL
217107	2001 XV_{136}	—	December 14, 2001	Socorro	LINEAR	(12739)	2.2 km	MPC · JPL
217108	2001 XL_{185}	—	December 14, 2001	Socorro	LINEAR	·	1.9 km	MPC · JPL
217109	2001 XP_{251}	—	December 14, 2001	Socorro	LINEAR	·	3.3 km	MPC · JPL
217110	2001 YR_{15}	—	December 17, 2001	Socorro	LINEAR	·	1.2 km	MPC · JPL
217111	2001 YL_{53}	—	December 18, 2001	Socorro	LINEAR	ADE	3.6 km	MPC · JPL
217112	2001 YQ_{99}	—	December 17, 2001	Socorro	LINEAR	(194)	1.9 km	MPC · JPL
217113	2001 YZ_{104}	—	December 17, 2001	Socorro	LINEAR	EUN	2.1 km	MPC · JPL
217114	2001 YH_{115}	—	December 17, 2001	Socorro	LINEAR	·	2.2 km	MPC · JPL
217115	2001 YD_{117}	—	December 18, 2001	Socorro	LINEAR	NYS	1.9 km	MPC · JPL
217116	2001 YN_{132}	—	December 20, 2001	Socorro	LINEAR	·	3.4 km	MPC · JPL
217117	2001 YG_{139}	—	December 24, 2001	Haleakala	NEAT	·	3.9 km	MPC · JPL
217118	2001 YD_{156}	—	December 20, 2001	Palomar	NEAT	·	4.5 km	MPC · JPL
217119	2002 AK_{12}	—	January 10, 2002	Campo Imperatore	CINEOS	·	2.7 km	MPC · JPL
217120	2002 CN_{8}	—	February 5, 2002	Palomar	NEAT	slow	2.2 km	MPC · JPL
217121	2002 CA_{115}	—	February 8, 2002	Socorro	LINEAR	EUP	6.7 km	MPC · JPL
217122	2002 CV_{162}	—	February 8, 2002	Socorro	LINEAR	·	1.9 km	MPC · JPL
217123	2002 CU_{251}	—	February 4, 2002	Palomar	NEAT	·	3.6 km	MPC · JPL
217124 Michaelsalinas	2002 CQ_{262}	Michaelsalinas	February 6, 2002	Kitt Peak	M. W. Buie	KOR	1.8 km	MPC · JPL
217125	2002 CJ_{266}	—	February 7, 2002	Kitt Peak	Spacewatch	MAS	800 m	MPC · JPL
217126	2002 CH_{311}	—	February 10, 2002	Socorro	LINEAR	·	4.7 km	MPC · JPL
217127	2002 DE_{5}	—	February 22, 2002	Socorro	LINEAR	·	2.1 km	MPC · JPL
217128	2002 DV_{15}	—	February 16, 2002	Palomar	NEAT	·	3.0 km	MPC · JPL
217129	2002 EX_{46}	—	March 11, 2002	Palomar	NEAT	·	3.0 km	MPC · JPL
217130	2002 EH_{103}	—	March 9, 2002	Palomar	NEAT	·	1.6 km	MPC · JPL
217131	2002 EO_{105}	—	March 9, 2002	Kitt Peak	Spacewatch	·	1.5 km	MPC · JPL
217132	2002 ED_{132}	—	March 13, 2002	Kitt Peak	Spacewatch	·	4.7 km	MPC · JPL
217133	2002 FC_{40}	—	March 18, 2002	Socorro	LINEAR	·	4.0 km	MPC · JPL
217134	2002 GS_{62}	—	April 8, 2002	Palomar	NEAT	·	950 m	MPC · JPL
217135	2002 GE_{100}	—	April 10, 2002	Socorro	LINEAR	·	4.4 km	MPC · JPL
217136	2002 GT_{109}	—	April 11, 2002	Palomar	NEAT	PHO	1.1 km	MPC · JPL
217137	2002 GH_{133}	—	April 12, 2002	Socorro	LINEAR	·	810 m	MPC · JPL
217138	2002 GA_{156}	—	April 13, 2002	Palomar	NEAT	·	5.0 km	MPC · JPL
217139	2002 GY_{168}	—	April 9, 2002	Socorro	LINEAR	·	1.0 km	MPC · JPL
217140	2002 GL_{177}	—	April 3, 2002	Palomar	White, M., M. Collins	VER	4.0 km	MPC · JPL
217141	2002 GT_{180}	—	April 12, 2002	Palomar	NEAT	·	3.4 km	MPC · JPL
217142	2002 JY_{74}	—	May 9, 2002	Socorro	LINEAR	·	920 m	MPC · JPL
217143	2002 LK_{11}	—	June 5, 2002	Socorro	LINEAR	·	980 m	MPC · JPL
217144	2002 LD_{48}	—	June 12, 2002	Palomar	NEAT	·	1.1 km	MPC · JPL
217145	2002 ML_{2}	—	June 16, 2002	Palomar	NEAT	·	1.1 km	MPC · JPL
217146	2002 NJ	—	July 1, 2002	Palomar	NEAT	·	950 m	MPC · JPL
217147	2002 NA_{18}	—	July 9, 2002	Socorro	LINEAR	·	2.3 km	MPC · JPL
217148	2002 NH_{26}	—	July 9, 2002	Socorro	LINEAR	PHO	1.5 km	MPC · JPL
217149	2002 NL_{34}	—	July 9, 2002	Socorro	LINEAR	(2076)	1.2 km	MPC · JPL
217150	2002 NU_{51}	—	July 14, 2002	Socorro	LINEAR	·	1.2 km	MPC · JPL
217151	2002 NX_{52}	—	July 14, 2002	Palomar	NEAT	·	990 m	MPC · JPL
217152	2002 NX_{59}	—	July 3, 2002	Palomar	NEAT	·	1.1 km	MPC · JPL
217153	2002 OD_{13}	—	July 18, 2002	Socorro	LINEAR	·	1.1 km	MPC · JPL
217154	2002 OZ_{21}	—	July 29, 2002	Palomar	NEAT	·	1.4 km	MPC · JPL
217155	2002 OX_{29}	—	July 17, 2002	Palomar	NEAT	·	740 m	MPC · JPL
217156	2002 PP_{18}	—	August 6, 2002	Palomar	NEAT	·	2.7 km	MPC · JPL
217157	2002 PA_{19}	—	August 6, 2002	Palomar	NEAT	V	980 m	MPC · JPL
217158	2002 PU_{32}	—	August 6, 2002	Palomar	NEAT	·	1.3 km	MPC · JPL
217159	2002 PV_{71}	—	August 12, 2002	Socorro	LINEAR	·	920 m	MPC · JPL
217160	2002 PB_{84}	—	August 10, 2002	Socorro	LINEAR	·	1.2 km	MPC · JPL
217161	2002 PL_{88}	—	August 12, 2002	Socorro	LINEAR	·	1.6 km	MPC · JPL
217162	2002 PW_{96}	—	August 14, 2002	Socorro	LINEAR	·	1.4 km	MPC · JPL
217163	2002 PJ_{103}	—	August 12, 2002	Socorro	LINEAR	·	970 m	MPC · JPL
217164	2002 PK_{122}	—	August 14, 2002	Kitt Peak	Spacewatch	·	1.2 km	MPC · JPL
217165	2002 PG_{127}	—	August 14, 2002	Socorro	LINEAR	·	1.6 km	MPC · JPL
217166	2002 PW_{141}	—	August 12, 2002	Socorro	LINEAR	PHO	1.7 km	MPC · JPL
217167	2002 PH_{155}	—	August 8, 2002	Palomar	S. F. Hönig	THM	3.4 km	MPC · JPL
217168	2002 QH_{3}	—	August 16, 2002	Palomar	NEAT	·	1.6 km	MPC · JPL
217169	2002 QA_{10}	—	August 19, 2002	Kvistaberg	Uppsala-DLR Asteroid Survey	·	1.3 km	MPC · JPL
217170	2002 QL_{28}	—	August 29, 2002	Palomar	NEAT	·	940 m	MPC · JPL
217171	2002 QR_{71}	—	August 19, 2002	Palomar	NEAT	·	960 m	MPC · JPL
217172	2002 QG_{108}	—	August 17, 2002	Palomar	NEAT	·	990 m	MPC · JPL
217173	2002 QA_{125}	—	August 18, 2002	Palomar	NEAT	·	1.2 km	MPC · JPL
217174	2002 RM_{32}	—	September 4, 2002	Anderson Mesa	LONEOS	·	1.3 km	MPC · JPL
217175	2002 RE_{42}	—	September 5, 2002	Socorro	LINEAR	·	1.1 km	MPC · JPL
217176	2002 RG_{55}	—	September 5, 2002	Anderson Mesa	LONEOS	ERI	1.9 km	MPC · JPL
217177	2002 RL_{59}	—	September 5, 2002	Anderson Mesa	LONEOS	V	1.1 km	MPC · JPL
217178	2002 RF_{68}	—	September 4, 2002	Anderson Mesa	LONEOS	·	1.5 km	MPC · JPL
217179	2002 RW_{85}	—	September 5, 2002	Socorro	LINEAR	·	1.3 km	MPC · JPL
217180	2002 RT_{99}	—	September 5, 2002	Socorro	LINEAR	·	1.6 km	MPC · JPL
217181	2002 RX_{101}	—	September 5, 2002	Socorro	LINEAR	NYS	1.7 km	MPC · JPL
217182	2002 RD_{104}	—	September 5, 2002	Socorro	LINEAR	·	3.1 km	MPC · JPL
217183	2002 RN_{181}	—	September 13, 2002	Palomar	NEAT	PHO	1.4 km	MPC · JPL
217184	2002 RF_{204}	—	September 14, 2002	Palomar	NEAT	·	1.4 km	MPC · JPL
217185	2002 RZ_{225}	—	September 13, 2002	Palomar	NEAT	V	1.1 km	MPC · JPL
217186	2002 RL_{245}	—	September 14, 2002	Palomar	NEAT	·	1.1 km	MPC · JPL
217187	2002 SC_{4}	—	September 26, 2002	Haleakala	NEAT	ERI	2.4 km	MPC · JPL
217188	2002 SE_{6}	—	September 27, 2002	Palomar	NEAT	MAS	1.2 km	MPC · JPL
217189	2002 SX_{56}	—	September 30, 2002	Socorro	LINEAR	·	2.2 km	MPC · JPL
217190	2002 SM_{67}	—	September 16, 2002	Palomar	NEAT	·	1.5 km	MPC · JPL
217191	2002 TP_{2}	—	October 1, 2002	Anderson Mesa	LONEOS	·	1.6 km	MPC · JPL
217192	2002 TS_{29}	—	October 2, 2002	Socorro	LINEAR	NYS	1.6 km	MPC · JPL
217193	2002 TS_{61}	—	October 3, 2002	Campo Imperatore	CINEOS	EOS	3.2 km	MPC · JPL
217194	2002 TR_{71}	—	October 3, 2002	Palomar	NEAT	·	2.2 km	MPC · JPL
217195	2002 TG_{83}	—	October 2, 2002	Haleakala	NEAT	·	1.3 km	MPC · JPL
217196	2002 TY_{110}	—	October 2, 2002	Campo Imperatore	CINEOS	HIL · 3:2	7.3 km	MPC · JPL
217197	2002 TF_{135}	—	October 4, 2002	Palomar	NEAT	·	5.8 km	MPC · JPL
217198	2002 TQ_{141}	—	October 4, 2002	Socorro	LINEAR	·	2.2 km	MPC · JPL
217199	2002 TO_{155}	—	October 5, 2002	Palomar	NEAT	·	1.2 km	MPC · JPL
217200	2002 TR_{167}	—	October 3, 2002	Palomar	NEAT	·	1.9 km	MPC · JPL

== 217201–217300 ==
back to top

Designation			Discovery			Properties		Ref
Permanent	Provisional	Named after	Date	Site	Discoverer(s)	Category	Diam.	Ref
217201	2002 TM_{186}	—	October 4, 2002	Socorro	LINEAR	·	1.9 km	MPC · JPL
217202	2002 TP_{198}	—	October 5, 2002	Socorro	LINEAR	·	2.2 km	MPC · JPL
217203	2002 TV_{210}	—	October 7, 2002	Socorro	LINEAR	NYS	1.8 km	MPC · JPL
217204	2002 TD_{220}	—	October 5, 2002	Socorro	LINEAR	·	2.2 km	MPC · JPL
217205	2002 TE_{223}	—	October 7, 2002	Socorro	LINEAR	·	1.6 km	MPC · JPL
217206	2002 TG_{224}	—	October 8, 2002	Anderson Mesa	LONEOS	NYS	1.3 km	MPC · JPL
217207	2002 TF_{233}	—	October 6, 2002	Socorro	LINEAR	·	4.6 km	MPC · JPL
217208	2002 TV_{256}	—	October 9, 2002	Socorro	LINEAR	T_{j} (2.99) · 3:2 · SHU	7.0 km	MPC · JPL
217209	2002 TM_{264}	—	October 10, 2002	Socorro	LINEAR	·	3.3 km	MPC · JPL
217210	2002 TC_{295}	—	October 13, 2002	Palomar	NEAT	·	3.6 km	MPC · JPL
217211	2002 TQ_{351}	—	October 10, 2002	Apache Point	SDSS	·	1.2 km	MPC · JPL
217212	2002 TA_{376}	—	October 5, 2002	Socorro	LINEAR	V	1.3 km	MPC · JPL
217213	2002 UC_{3}	—	October 28, 2002	Socorro	LINEAR	·	3.2 km	MPC · JPL
217214	2002 UK_{26}	—	October 31, 2002	Socorro	LINEAR	·	1.8 km	MPC · JPL
217215	2002 UN_{74}	—	October 30, 2002	Palomar	NEAT	V	1.1 km	MPC · JPL
217216	2002 VR_{26}	—	November 5, 2002	Socorro	LINEAR	TIR	4.0 km	MPC · JPL
217217	2002 VD_{28}	—	November 5, 2002	Anderson Mesa	LONEOS	·	2.3 km	MPC · JPL
217218	2002 VY_{28}	—	November 5, 2002	Anderson Mesa	LONEOS	NYS	1.8 km	MPC · JPL
217219	2002 VH_{29}	—	November 5, 2002	Socorro	LINEAR	V	1.4 km	MPC · JPL
217220	2002 VM_{58}	—	November 6, 2002	Haleakala	NEAT	NYS	1.8 km	MPC · JPL
217221	2002 VB_{84}	—	November 7, 2002	Socorro	LINEAR	·	1.7 km	MPC · JPL
217222	2002 VQ_{86}	—	November 8, 2002	Socorro	LINEAR	·	2.9 km	MPC · JPL
217223	2002 VR_{109}	—	November 12, 2002	Socorro	LINEAR	·	1.5 km	MPC · JPL
217224	2002 XR_{5}	—	December 1, 2002	Socorro	LINEAR	·	3.5 km	MPC · JPL
217225	2002 XW_{14}	—	December 7, 2002	Desert Eagle	W. K. Y. Yeung	·	1.8 km	MPC · JPL
217226	2002 XX_{51}	—	December 10, 2002	Socorro	LINEAR	NYS	2.1 km	MPC · JPL
217227	2002 XC_{61}	—	December 10, 2002	Socorro	LINEAR	·	1.8 km	MPC · JPL
217228	2003 AL_{42}	—	January 7, 2003	Socorro	LINEAR	H	850 m	MPC · JPL
217229	2003 AJ_{86}	—	January 1, 2003	Socorro	LINEAR	·	2.8 km	MPC · JPL
217230	2003 BX_{43}	—	January 28, 2003	Palomar	NEAT	·	1.3 km	MPC · JPL
217231	2003 BY_{46}	—	January 31, 2003	Tebbutt	F. B. Zoltowski	·	2.8 km	MPC · JPL
217232	2003 BU_{48}	—	January 26, 2003	Kitt Peak	Spacewatch	NYS	1.6 km	MPC · JPL
217233	2003 BT_{61}	—	January 28, 2003	Socorro	LINEAR	H	980 m	MPC · JPL
217234	2003 EK_{47}	—	March 9, 2003	Anderson Mesa	LONEOS	H	750 m	MPC · JPL
217235	2003 FD_{12}	—	March 24, 2003	Kitt Peak	Spacewatch	·	2.8 km	MPC · JPL
217236	2003 FQ_{78}	—	March 27, 2003	Kitt Peak	Spacewatch	·	2.0 km	MPC · JPL
217237	2003 GD_{37}	—	April 6, 2003	Anderson Mesa	LONEOS	H	1.1 km	MPC · JPL
217238	2003 HT_{5}	—	April 21, 2003	Kvistaberg	Uppsala-DLR Asteroid Survey	BRA	2.1 km	MPC · JPL
217239	2003 HL_{21}	—	April 26, 2003	Kitt Peak	Spacewatch	·	1.3 km	MPC · JPL
217240	2003 HQ_{58}	—	April 30, 2003	Kitt Peak	Spacewatch	·	2.7 km	MPC · JPL
217241	2003 KK_{15}	—	May 25, 2003	Kitt Peak	Spacewatch	·	2.9 km	MPC · JPL
217242	2003 KY_{16}	—	May 25, 2003	Goodricke-Pigott	R. A. Tucker	·	5.1 km	MPC · JPL
217243	2003 MU_{2}	—	June 24, 2003	Anderson Mesa	LONEOS	EUP	7.0 km	MPC · JPL
217244	2003 ML_{7}	—	June 29, 2003	Socorro	LINEAR	·	4.6 km	MPC · JPL
217245	2003 OD_{12}	—	July 22, 2003	Palomar	NEAT	·	7.5 km	MPC · JPL
217246	2003 PH_{10}	—	August 5, 2003	Kitt Peak	Spacewatch	·	5.1 km	MPC · JPL
217247	2003 QF	—	August 18, 2003	Campo Imperatore	CINEOS	·	2.2 km	MPC · JPL
217248	2003 SG_{123}	—	September 18, 2003	Socorro	LINEAR	·	4.0 km	MPC · JPL
217249	2003 SQ_{305}	—	September 30, 2003	Socorro	LINEAR	VER	4.6 km	MPC · JPL
217250	2003 TP_{11}	—	October 14, 2003	Anderson Mesa	LONEOS	NYS	1.9 km	MPC · JPL
217251	2003 UM_{25}	—	October 24, 2003	Socorro	LINEAR	·	2.1 km	MPC · JPL
217252	2003 US_{118}	—	October 17, 2003	Kitt Peak	Spacewatch	·	1.2 km	MPC · JPL
217253	2003 UK_{153}	—	October 19, 2003	Kitt Peak	Spacewatch	EUN	5.6 km	MPC · JPL
217254	2003 UT_{191}	—	October 23, 2003	Anderson Mesa	LONEOS	·	2.3 km	MPC · JPL
217255	2003 UB_{277}	—	October 30, 2003	Haleakala	NEAT	·	1.3 km	MPC · JPL
217256	2003 UR_{315}	—	October 20, 2003	Socorro	LINEAR	·	1.9 km	MPC · JPL
217257 Valemangano	2003 WU_{26}	Valemangano	November 19, 2003	Campo Imperatore	CINEOS	·	920 m	MPC · JPL
217258	2003 WE_{41}	—	November 19, 2003	Kitt Peak	Spacewatch	·	820 m	MPC · JPL
217259	2003 WP_{43}	—	November 19, 2003	Palomar	NEAT	·	4.4 km	MPC · JPL
217260	2003 WK_{120}	—	November 20, 2003	Socorro	LINEAR	·	1.1 km	MPC · JPL
217261	2003 XZ_{28}	—	December 1, 2003	Kitt Peak	Spacewatch	·	1.1 km	MPC · JPL
217262	2003 YN_{3}	—	December 18, 2003	Socorro	LINEAR	·	1.0 km	MPC · JPL
217263	2003 YE_{51}	—	December 18, 2003	Socorro	LINEAR	V	1.1 km	MPC · JPL
217264	2003 YP_{58}	—	December 19, 2003	Socorro	LINEAR	·	2.9 km	MPC · JPL
217265	2003 YP_{66}	—	December 20, 2003	Socorro	LINEAR	EUP	8.5 km	MPC · JPL
217266	2003 YR_{67}	—	December 19, 2003	Kitt Peak	Spacewatch	·	920 m	MPC · JPL
217267	2003 YX_{68}	—	December 20, 2003	Socorro	LINEAR	·	2.2 km	MPC · JPL
217268	2003 YE_{75}	—	December 18, 2003	Socorro	LINEAR	·	1.1 km	MPC · JPL
217269	2003 YO_{88}	—	December 19, 2003	Socorro	LINEAR	·	1.6 km	MPC · JPL
217270	2003 YZ_{101}	—	December 19, 2003	Socorro	LINEAR	·	1.2 km	MPC · JPL
217271	2003 YK_{147}	—	December 29, 2003	Socorro	LINEAR	EUN	2.0 km	MPC · JPL
217272	2004 AQ_{2}	—	January 13, 2004	Anderson Mesa	LONEOS	·	1.9 km	MPC · JPL
217273	2004 BZ_{22}	—	January 17, 2004	Palomar	NEAT	·	3.1 km	MPC · JPL
217274	2004 BE_{51}	—	January 21, 2004	Socorro	LINEAR	·	2.7 km	MPC · JPL
217275	2004 BC_{99}	—	January 27, 2004	Kitt Peak	Spacewatch	·	1.8 km	MPC · JPL
217276	2004 BO_{129}	—	January 16, 2004	Kitt Peak	Spacewatch	·	1.4 km	MPC · JPL
217277	2004 CD_{53}	—	February 11, 2004	Kitt Peak	Spacewatch	·	1.4 km	MPC · JPL
217278	2004 DR_{16}	—	February 18, 2004	Kitt Peak	Spacewatch	·	2.0 km	MPC · JPL
217279	2004 DF_{23}	—	February 18, 2004	Catalina	CSS	·	4.5 km	MPC · JPL
217280	2004 DF_{28}	—	February 17, 2004	Palomar	NEAT	·	1.6 km	MPC · JPL
217281	2004 DU_{71}	—	February 16, 2004	Socorro	LINEAR	·	6.0 km	MPC · JPL
217282	2004 EX_{5}	—	March 11, 2004	Palomar	NEAT	·	2.4 km	MPC · JPL
217283	2004 EJ_{17}	—	March 12, 2004	Palomar	NEAT	·	4.7 km	MPC · JPL
217284	2004 EH_{25}	—	March 11, 2004	Palomar	NEAT	·	2.0 km	MPC · JPL
217285	2004 EP_{92}	—	March 15, 2004	Kitt Peak	Spacewatch	NYS	1.4 km	MPC · JPL
217286	2004 FP_{58}	—	March 17, 2004	Kitt Peak	Spacewatch	·	1.5 km	MPC · JPL
217287	2004 FO_{62}	—	March 19, 2004	Socorro	LINEAR	·	4.7 km	MPC · JPL
217288	2004 FT_{97}	—	March 23, 2004	Socorro	LINEAR	·	6.5 km	MPC · JPL
217289	2004 FD_{129}	—	March 28, 2004	Socorro	LINEAR	·	3.2 km	MPC · JPL
217290	2004 FF_{129}	—	March 28, 2004	Socorro	LINEAR	·	2.7 km	MPC · JPL
217291	2004 GW_{14}	—	April 13, 2004	Siding Spring	SSS	EUN ·	2.0 km	MPC · JPL
217292	2004 GU_{30}	—	April 12, 2004	Palomar	NEAT	·	3.0 km	MPC · JPL
217293	2004 GB_{31}	—	April 13, 2004	Kitt Peak	Spacewatch	ADE	2.6 km	MPC · JPL
217294	2004 GS_{42}	—	April 15, 2004	Anderson Mesa	LONEOS	·	2.1 km	MPC · JPL
217295	2004 HG_{5}	—	April 16, 2004	Palomar	NEAT	·	2.7 km	MPC · JPL
217296	2004 HK_{44}	—	April 21, 2004	Socorro	LINEAR	·	1.1 km	MPC · JPL
217297	2004 HD_{78}	—	April 16, 2004	Socorro	LINEAR	·	2.4 km	MPC · JPL
217298	2004 JY_{4}	—	May 11, 2004	Siding Spring	SSS	·	2.9 km	MPC · JPL
217299	2004 JQ_{10}	—	May 12, 2004	Catalina	CSS	·	3.1 km	MPC · JPL
217300	2004 JC_{12}	—	May 9, 2004	Catalina	CSS	·	2.9 km	MPC · JPL

== 217301–217400 ==
back to top

Designation			Discovery			Properties		Ref
Permanent	Provisional	Named after	Date	Site	Discoverer(s)	Category	Diam.	Ref
217301	2004 JQ_{12}	—	May 9, 2004	Kitt Peak	Spacewatch	·	2.6 km	MPC · JPL
217302	2004 JJ_{22}	—	May 9, 2004	Kitt Peak	Spacewatch	·	4.5 km	MPC · JPL
217303	2004 JB_{24}	—	May 15, 2004	Socorro	LINEAR	·	2.6 km	MPC · JPL
217304	2004 JT_{30}	—	May 15, 2004	Socorro	LINEAR	NYS	1.3 km	MPC · JPL
217305	2004 JA_{34}	—	May 15, 2004	Socorro	LINEAR	fast	3.2 km	MPC · JPL
217306	2004 LF_{3}	—	June 6, 2004	Palomar	NEAT	DOR	3.6 km	MPC · JPL
217307	2004 LM_{6}	—	June 9, 2004	Siding Spring	SSS	ADE	3.4 km	MPC · JPL
217308	2004 MK_{3}	—	June 20, 2004	Socorro	LINEAR	·	5.9 km	MPC · JPL
217309	2004 NR_{19}	—	July 14, 2004	Socorro	LINEAR	·	2.3 km	MPC · JPL
217310	2004 NB_{20}	—	July 14, 2004	Socorro	LINEAR	BRA	1.9 km	MPC · JPL
217311	2004 OH_{6}	—	July 20, 2004	Siding Spring	SSS	EUP	7.4 km	MPC · JPL
217312	2004 PP_{11}	—	August 7, 2004	Palomar	NEAT	·	2.9 km	MPC · JPL
217313	2004 PL_{15}	—	August 7, 2004	Palomar	NEAT	·	3.5 km	MPC · JPL
217314	2004 PQ_{35}	—	August 8, 2004	Anderson Mesa	LONEOS	·	4.2 km	MPC · JPL
217315	2004 PW_{39}	—	August 9, 2004	Socorro	LINEAR	H	840 m	MPC · JPL
217316	2004 PX_{52}	—	August 8, 2004	Socorro	LINEAR	·	3.5 km	MPC · JPL
217317	2004 PR_{57}	—	August 9, 2004	Socorro	LINEAR	·	2.6 km	MPC · JPL
217318	2004 PM_{67}	—	August 5, 2004	Palomar	NEAT	NAE	3.6 km	MPC · JPL
217319	2004 PD_{68}	—	August 6, 2004	Palomar	NEAT	·	2.8 km	MPC · JPL
217320	2004 PD_{78}	—	August 9, 2004	Socorro	LINEAR	EOS	3.0 km	MPC · JPL
217321	2004 PR_{88}	—	August 7, 2004	Campo Imperatore	CINEOS	·	1.1 km	MPC · JPL
217322	2004 PN_{102}	—	August 12, 2004	Socorro	LINEAR	·	6.2 km	MPC · JPL
217323	2004 PV_{108}	—	August 10, 2004	Socorro	LINEAR	·	4.1 km	MPC · JPL
217324	2004 QY_{13}	—	August 24, 2004	Socorro	LINEAR	·	6.0 km	MPC · JPL
217325	2004 RB_{43}	—	September 8, 2004	Socorro	LINEAR	EOS	2.8 km	MPC · JPL
217326	2004 RT_{50}	—	September 8, 2004	Socorro	LINEAR	·	3.4 km	MPC · JPL
217327	2004 RN_{51}	—	September 8, 2004	Socorro	LINEAR	THM	3.2 km	MPC · JPL
217328	2004 RV_{62}	—	September 8, 2004	Socorro	LINEAR	·	3.3 km	MPC · JPL
217329	2004 RS_{66}	—	September 8, 2004	Socorro	LINEAR	·	7.4 km	MPC · JPL
217330	2004 RU_{69}	—	September 8, 2004	Socorro	LINEAR	EOS	2.3 km	MPC · JPL
217331	2004 RE_{73}	—	September 8, 2004	Socorro	LINEAR	·	3.5 km	MPC · JPL
217332	2004 RS_{79}	—	September 8, 2004	Uccle	Uccle	EOS	2.7 km	MPC · JPL
217333	2004 RX_{80}	—	September 8, 2004	Socorro	LINEAR	·	2.5 km	MPC · JPL
217334	2004 RY_{81}	—	September 8, 2004	Palomar	NEAT	EOS	3.0 km	MPC · JPL
217335	2004 RG_{87}	—	September 7, 2004	Palomar	NEAT	·	3.5 km	MPC · JPL
217336	2004 RB_{93}	—	September 8, 2004	Socorro	LINEAR	·	2.9 km	MPC · JPL
217337	2004 RB_{140}	—	September 8, 2004	Socorro	LINEAR	·	2.7 km	MPC · JPL
217338	2004 RM_{150}	—	September 9, 2004	Socorro	LINEAR	·	2.7 km	MPC · JPL
217339	2004 RD_{153}	—	September 10, 2004	Socorro	LINEAR	·	3.1 km	MPC · JPL
217340	2004 RZ_{174}	—	September 10, 2004	Socorro	LINEAR	·	3.4 km	MPC · JPL
217341	2004 RT_{179}	—	September 10, 2004	Socorro	LINEAR	EOS	4.2 km	MPC · JPL
217342	2004 RX_{180}	—	September 10, 2004	Socorro	LINEAR	HYG	3.8 km	MPC · JPL
217343	2004 RX_{186}	—	September 10, 2004	Socorro	LINEAR	EOS	3.5 km	MPC · JPL
217344	2004 RV_{188}	—	September 10, 2004	Socorro	LINEAR	EOS	3.2 km	MPC · JPL
217345	2004 RR_{195}	—	September 10, 2004	Socorro	LINEAR	EOS	3.6 km	MPC · JPL
217346	2004 RV_{197}	—	September 10, 2004	Socorro	LINEAR	(31811)	4.2 km	MPC · JPL
217347	2004 RE_{202}	—	September 11, 2004	Socorro	LINEAR	EOS	3.1 km	MPC · JPL
217348	2004 RA_{213}	—	September 11, 2004	Socorro	LINEAR	·	5.5 km	MPC · JPL
217349	2004 RS_{217}	—	September 11, 2004	Socorro	LINEAR	·	4.9 km	MPC · JPL
217350	2004 RZ_{219}	—	September 11, 2004	Socorro	LINEAR	·	5.4 km	MPC · JPL
217351	2004 RD_{220}	—	September 11, 2004	Socorro	LINEAR	URS	5.4 km	MPC · JPL
217352	2004 RK_{256}	—	September 8, 2004	Socorro	LINEAR	·	2.0 km	MPC · JPL
217353	2004 RV_{284}	—	September 15, 2004	Kitt Peak	Spacewatch	·	2.6 km	MPC · JPL
217354	2004 RC_{290}	—	September 15, 2004	Socorro	LINEAR	H	870 m	MPC · JPL
217355	2004 RU_{290}	—	September 9, 2004	Socorro	LINEAR	·	4.3 km	MPC · JPL
217356	2004 RA_{294}	—	September 11, 2004	Palomar	NEAT	·	4.7 km	MPC · JPL
217357	2004 RL_{315}	—	September 15, 2004	Siding Spring	SSS	EOS	3.4 km	MPC · JPL
217358	2004 SW_{25}	—	September 22, 2004	Desert Eagle	W. K. Y. Yeung	·	1.9 km	MPC · JPL
217359	2004 SE_{47}	—	September 18, 2004	Socorro	LINEAR	·	3.7 km	MPC · JPL
217360	2004 SN_{50}	—	September 22, 2004	Socorro	LINEAR	·	3.1 km	MPC · JPL
217361	2004 TJ_{7}	—	October 5, 2004	Socorro	LINEAR	·	5.3 km	MPC · JPL
217362	2004 TT_{11}	—	October 7, 2004	Kitt Peak	Spacewatch	·	3.6 km	MPC · JPL
217363	2004 TV_{32}	—	October 4, 2004	Kitt Peak	Spacewatch	·	3.6 km	MPC · JPL
217364	2004 TW_{32}	—	October 4, 2004	Anderson Mesa	LONEOS	·	4.7 km	MPC · JPL
217365	2004 TY_{33}	—	October 4, 2004	Anderson Mesa	LONEOS	NYS	1.5 km	MPC · JPL
217366 Mayalin	2004 TW_{49}	Mayalin	October 4, 2004	Vail-Jarnac	Jarnac	·	1.8 km	MPC · JPL
217367	2004 TW_{65}	—	October 5, 2004	Anderson Mesa	LONEOS	HYG	4.3 km	MPC · JPL
217368	2004 TJ_{79}	—	October 4, 2004	Anderson Mesa	LONEOS	·	4.7 km	MPC · JPL
217369	2004 TC_{151}	—	October 6, 2004	Kitt Peak	Spacewatch	·	3.3 km	MPC · JPL
217370	2004 TQ_{166}	—	October 7, 2004	Kitt Peak	Spacewatch	·	2.9 km	MPC · JPL
217371	2004 TM_{169}	—	October 7, 2004	Socorro	LINEAR	·	4.3 km	MPC · JPL
217372	2004 TN_{171}	—	October 8, 2004	Socorro	LINEAR	TIR	3.7 km	MPC · JPL
217373	2004 TZ_{202}	—	October 7, 2004	Kitt Peak	Spacewatch	·	5.9 km	MPC · JPL
217374	2004 TZ_{221}	—	October 7, 2004	Socorro	LINEAR	·	4.8 km	MPC · JPL
217375	2004 TS_{282}	—	October 7, 2004	Palomar	NEAT	·	5.8 km	MPC · JPL
217376	2004 TB_{357}	—	October 14, 2004	Anderson Mesa	LONEOS	·	4.6 km	MPC · JPL
217377	2004 UF_{2}	—	October 18, 2004	Socorro	LINEAR	VER	5.1 km	MPC · JPL
217378	2004 UQ_{2}	—	October 18, 2004	Socorro	LINEAR	·	6.0 km	MPC · JPL
217379	2004 UK_{4}	—	October 16, 2004	Socorro	LINEAR	·	6.9 km	MPC · JPL
217380	2004 VE	—	November 1, 2004	Palomar	NEAT	·	4.8 km	MPC · JPL
217381	2004 VP_{54}	—	November 6, 2004	Socorro	LINEAR	·	2.6 km	MPC · JPL
217382	2004 VL_{58}	—	November 9, 2004	Catalina	CSS	·	4.0 km	MPC · JPL
217383	2004 WO_{9}	—	November 19, 2004	Socorro	LINEAR	·	2.0 km	MPC · JPL
217384	2004 XD_{1}	—	December 1, 2004	Catalina	CSS	H	870 m	MPC · JPL
217385	2004 XK_{1}	—	December 1, 2004	Catalina	CSS	·	5.6 km	MPC · JPL
217386	2004 XC_{80}	—	December 10, 2004	Anderson Mesa	LONEOS	·	4.2 km	MPC · JPL
217387	2004 XH_{103}	—	December 14, 2004	Catalina	CSS	H	860 m	MPC · JPL
217388	2004 XD_{128}	—	December 14, 2004	Socorro	LINEAR	·	3.5 km	MPC · JPL
217389	2005 BS_{26}	—	January 19, 2005	Socorro	LINEAR	DOR	3.4 km	MPC · JPL
217390	2005 CW_{25}	—	February 5, 2005	Palomar	NEAT	APO	610 m	MPC · JPL
217391	2005 EH_{19}	—	March 3, 2005	Kitt Peak	Spacewatch	VER	4.8 km	MPC · JPL
217392	2005 EL_{61}	—	March 4, 2005	Catalina	CSS	·	1.3 km	MPC · JPL
217393	2005 EU_{79}	—	March 3, 2005	Catalina	CSS	HYG	5.5 km	MPC · JPL
217394	2005 EL_{107}	—	March 4, 2005	Kitt Peak	Spacewatch	·	1.0 km	MPC · JPL
217395	2005 EA_{175}	—	March 8, 2005	Kitt Peak	Spacewatch	·	1.4 km	MPC · JPL
217396	2005 EA_{247}	—	March 12, 2005	Socorro	LINEAR	·	2.3 km	MPC · JPL
217397	2005 GK_{19}	—	April 2, 2005	Mount Lemmon	Mount Lemmon Survey	BAP	1.5 km	MPC · JPL
217398 Tihany	2005 GC_{22}	Tihany	April 5, 2005	Piszkéstető	K. Sárneczky	·	1.1 km	MPC · JPL
217399	2005 GV_{112}	—	April 6, 2005	Kitt Peak	Spacewatch	·	980 m	MPC · JPL
217400	2005 GT_{179}	—	April 1, 2005	Catalina	CSS	·	2.4 km	MPC · JPL

== 217401–217500 ==
back to top

Designation			Discovery			Properties		Ref
Permanent	Provisional	Named after	Date	Site	Discoverer(s)	Category	Diam.	Ref
217401	2005 GY_{223}	—	April 4, 2005	Mount Lemmon	Mount Lemmon Survey	·	1.2 km	MPC · JPL
217402	2005 HP_{5}	—	April 30, 2005	Campo Imperatore	CINEOS	·	1.3 km	MPC · JPL
217403	2005 JG	—	May 2, 2005	Reedy Creek	J. Broughton	PHO	2.8 km	MPC · JPL
217404	2005 JH_{36}	—	May 4, 2005	Kitt Peak	Spacewatch	·	1.3 km	MPC · JPL
217405	2005 JQ_{61}	—	May 8, 2005	Siding Spring	SSS	NYS	1.6 km	MPC · JPL
217406	2005 JN_{79}	—	May 10, 2005	Mount Lemmon	Mount Lemmon Survey	NYS	1.3 km	MPC · JPL
217407	2005 JX_{88}	—	May 11, 2005	Palomar	NEAT	EUN	2.0 km	MPC · JPL
217408	2005 KW	—	May 16, 2005	Kitt Peak	Spacewatch	V	670 m	MPC · JPL
217409	2005 LQ	—	June 1, 2005	Kitt Peak	Spacewatch	·	1.6 km	MPC · JPL
217410	2005 LJ_{46}	—	June 13, 2005	Mount Lemmon	Mount Lemmon Survey	·	2.5 km	MPC · JPL
217411	2005 LD_{50}	—	June 11, 2005	Catalina	CSS	fast?	2.4 km	MPC · JPL
217412	2005 MT_{1}	—	June 16, 2005	Catalina	CSS	·	2.6 km	MPC · JPL
217413	2005 ND_{87}	—	July 3, 2005	Mount Lemmon	Mount Lemmon Survey	NYS	1.4 km	MPC · JPL
217414	2005 NE_{96}	—	July 7, 2005	Socorro	LINEAR	·	3.2 km	MPC · JPL
217415	2005 OA_{12}	—	July 29, 2005	Palomar	NEAT	·	2.2 km	MPC · JPL
217416	2005 PW_{3}	—	August 6, 2005	Reedy Creek	J. Broughton	·	2.0 km	MPC · JPL
217417	2005 QB_{7}	—	August 24, 2005	Palomar	NEAT	·	1.9 km	MPC · JPL
217418	2005 QG_{39}	—	August 26, 2005	Anderson Mesa	LONEOS	EUN	1.3 km	MPC · JPL
217419	2005 QV_{83}	—	August 29, 2005	Anderson Mesa	LONEOS	JUN	1.4 km	MPC · JPL
217420 Olevsk	2005 QW_{148}	Olevsk	August 31, 2005	Andrushivka	Andrushivka	·	1.6 km	MPC · JPL
217421	2005 QO_{151}	—	August 30, 2005	Kitt Peak	Spacewatch	·	2.5 km	MPC · JPL
217422	2005 QC_{170}	—	August 29, 2005	Palomar	NEAT	·	3.6 km	MPC · JPL
217423	2005 QC_{171}	—	August 29, 2005	Palomar	NEAT	·	2.6 km	MPC · JPL
217424	2005 QO_{178}	—	August 27, 2005	Palomar	NEAT	·	2.1 km	MPC · JPL
217425	2005 RF	—	September 1, 2005	Wrightwood	J. W. Young	·	2.4 km	MPC · JPL
217426	2005 RR_{23}	—	September 10, 2005	Anderson Mesa	LONEOS	·	3.3 km	MPC · JPL
217427	2005 RL_{30}	—	September 9, 2005	Socorro	LINEAR	·	3.1 km	MPC · JPL
217428	2005 RY_{43}	—	September 11, 2005	Anderson Mesa	LONEOS	JUN	1.6 km	MPC · JPL
217429	2005 RK_{44}	—	September 10, 2005	Anderson Mesa	LONEOS	WIT	1.5 km	MPC · JPL
217430	2005 SN_{25}	—	September 28, 2005	Palomar	NEAT	APO · PHA	440 m	MPC · JPL
217431	2005 ST_{29}	—	September 23, 2005	Kitt Peak	Spacewatch	·	1.6 km	MPC · JPL
217432	2005 SF_{58}	—	September 26, 2005	Calvin-Rehoboth	Calvin College	·	1.9 km	MPC · JPL
217433	2005 SX_{65}	—	September 26, 2005	Catalina	CSS	·	4.5 km	MPC · JPL
217434	2005 SY_{95}	—	September 25, 2005	Kitt Peak	Spacewatch	MRX	1.9 km	MPC · JPL
217435	2005 SB_{96}	—	September 25, 2005	Kitt Peak	Spacewatch	·	2.1 km	MPC · JPL
217436	2005 SK_{99}	—	September 25, 2005	Kitt Peak	Spacewatch	NEM	3.4 km	MPC · JPL
217437	2005 SH_{151}	—	September 25, 2005	Kitt Peak	Spacewatch	·	2.5 km	MPC · JPL
217438	2005 SK_{157}	—	September 26, 2005	Palomar	NEAT	·	1.7 km	MPC · JPL
217439	2005 SR_{158}	—	September 26, 2005	Palomar	NEAT	·	2.2 km	MPC · JPL
217440	2005 SQ_{192}	—	September 29, 2005	Mount Lemmon	Mount Lemmon Survey	AST	2.3 km	MPC · JPL
217441	2005 SO_{194}	—	September 30, 2005	Kitt Peak	Spacewatch	NEM	3.1 km	MPC · JPL
217442	2005 SU_{204}	—	September 30, 2005	Anderson Mesa	LONEOS	NEM	3.1 km	MPC · JPL
217443	2005 SA_{206}	—	September 30, 2005	Anderson Mesa	LONEOS	·	1.8 km	MPC · JPL
217444	2005 SY_{240}	—	September 30, 2005	Kitt Peak	Spacewatch	NEM	3.5 km	MPC · JPL
217445	2005 SF_{243}	—	September 30, 2005	Palomar	NEAT	·	3.0 km	MPC · JPL
217446	2005 SD_{272}	—	September 27, 2005	Socorro	LINEAR	·	2.1 km	MPC · JPL
217447	2005 SP_{280}	—	September 27, 2005	Socorro	LINEAR	·	2.2 km	MPC · JPL
217448	2005 TZ_{4}	—	October 1, 2005	Catalina	CSS	·	1.9 km	MPC · JPL
217449	2005 TX_{5}	—	October 1, 2005	Catalina	CSS	·	2.6 km	MPC · JPL
217450	2005 TG_{56}	—	October 1, 2005	Socorro	LINEAR	HOF	3.8 km	MPC · JPL
217451	2005 TG_{104}	—	October 8, 2005	Socorro	LINEAR	·	3.1 km	MPC · JPL
217452	2005 TL_{165}	—	October 9, 2005	Kitt Peak	Spacewatch	·	2.7 km	MPC · JPL
217453	2005 TH_{172}	—	October 11, 2005	Anderson Mesa	LONEOS	·	2.8 km	MPC · JPL
217454	2005 TC_{175}	—	October 1, 2005	Anderson Mesa	LONEOS	·	2.6 km	MPC · JPL
217455	2005 TL_{180}	—	October 1, 2005	Catalina	CSS	·	1.9 km	MPC · JPL
217456	2005 UA_{42}	—	October 25, 2005	Catalina	CSS	·	2.6 km	MPC · JPL
217457	2005 UY_{45}	—	October 22, 2005	Catalina	CSS	·	2.7 km	MPC · JPL
217458	2005 UC_{109}	—	October 22, 2005	Palomar	NEAT	EOS	3.3 km	MPC · JPL
217459	2005 UR_{186}	—	October 26, 2005	Kitt Peak	Spacewatch	·	2.5 km	MPC · JPL
217460	2005 UF_{220}	—	October 25, 2005	Kitt Peak	Spacewatch	·	2.8 km	MPC · JPL
217461	2005 UZ_{274}	—	October 28, 2005	Mount Lemmon	Mount Lemmon Survey	·	3.1 km	MPC · JPL
217462	2005 UV_{322}	—	October 28, 2005	Kitt Peak	Spacewatch	DOR	3.6 km	MPC · JPL
217463	2005 UO_{385}	—	October 28, 2005	Catalina	CSS	·	2.7 km	MPC · JPL
217464	2005 UR_{386}	—	October 30, 2005	Catalina	CSS	·	2.9 km	MPC · JPL
217465	2005 UG_{477}	—	October 25, 2005	Mount Lemmon	Mount Lemmon Survey	KOR	1.8 km	MPC · JPL
217466	2005 VV_{4}	—	November 4, 2005	Kambah	Herald, D.	MAR	1.4 km	MPC · JPL
217467	2005 VQ_{49}	—	November 2, 2005	Socorro	LINEAR	HOF	3.4 km	MPC · JPL
217468	2005 VZ_{126}	—	November 1, 2005	Apache Point	A. C. Becker	·	1.2 km	MPC · JPL
217469	2005 WQ_{21}	—	November 21, 2005	Kitt Peak	Spacewatch	EOS	2.8 km	MPC · JPL
217470	2005 WZ_{25}	—	November 21, 2005	Kitt Peak	Spacewatch	·	2.4 km	MPC · JPL
217471	2005 WL_{97}	—	November 26, 2005	Mount Lemmon	Mount Lemmon Survey	KOR	1.9 km	MPC · JPL
217472 Addams	2005 WV_{105}	Addams	November 29, 2005	Catalina	CSS	·	2.8 km	MPC · JPL
217473	2005 WU_{111}	—	November 30, 2005	Socorro	LINEAR	·	4.2 km	MPC · JPL
217474	2005 WP_{113}	—	November 27, 2005	Socorro	LINEAR	·	3.6 km	MPC · JPL
217475	2005 WO_{157}	—	November 25, 2005	Mount Lemmon	Mount Lemmon Survey	V	840 m	MPC · JPL
217476	2005 WS_{191}	—	November 25, 2005	Catalina	CSS	·	2.1 km	MPC · JPL
217477	2005 XZ_{10}	—	December 1, 2005	Kitt Peak	Spacewatch	HYG	7.1 km	MPC · JPL
217478	2005 XE_{36}	—	December 4, 2005	Kitt Peak	Spacewatch	·	2.1 km	MPC · JPL
217479	2005 XV_{116}	—	December 1, 2005	Mount Lemmon	Mount Lemmon Survey	NYS	1.6 km	MPC · JPL
217480	2005 YM_{49}	—	December 22, 2005	Kitt Peak	Spacewatch	·	4.1 km	MPC · JPL
217481	2005 YW_{170}	—	December 30, 2005	Socorro	LINEAR	·	5.7 km	MPC · JPL
217482	2005 YS_{249}	—	December 28, 2005	Kitt Peak	Spacewatch	·	4.7 km	MPC · JPL
217483	2005 YG_{290}	—	December 25, 2005	Kitt Peak	Spacewatch	NYS	1.5 km	MPC · JPL
217484	2006 BK_{231}	—	January 31, 2006	Kitt Peak	Spacewatch	NYS	1.5 km	MPC · JPL
217485	2006 BT_{270}	—	January 31, 2006	Anderson Mesa	LONEOS	GAL	2.1 km	MPC · JPL
217486	2006 DX_{122}	—	February 27, 2006	Socorro	LINEAR	H	810 m	MPC · JPL
217487	2006 DD_{200}	—	February 24, 2006	Catalina	CSS	·	3.2 km	MPC · JPL
217488	2006 EB_{45}	—	March 3, 2006	Catalina	CSS	EOS	3.3 km	MPC · JPL
217489	2006 FP_{43}	—	March 22, 2006	Catalina	CSS	·	5.2 km	MPC · JPL
217490	2006 GV_{12}	—	April 2, 2006	Kitt Peak	Spacewatch	·	1.2 km	MPC · JPL
217491	2006 HB_{23}	—	April 20, 2006	Kitt Peak	Spacewatch	KOR	1.7 km	MPC · JPL
217492 Howardtaylor	2006 HG_{127}	Howardtaylor	April 28, 2006	Cerro Tololo	M. W. Buie	THM	3.1 km	MPC · JPL
217493	2006 KK_{69}	—	May 22, 2006	Kitt Peak	Spacewatch	MAR	1.5 km	MPC · JPL
217494	2006 RK_{2}	—	September 14, 2006	Hibiscus	S. F. Hönig	·	1.4 km	MPC · JPL
217495	2006 SU_{3}	—	September 16, 2006	Catalina	CSS	·	3.0 km	MPC · JPL
217496	2006 SK_{6}	—	September 16, 2006	Anderson Mesa	LONEOS	·	950 m	MPC · JPL
217497	2006 SJ_{55}	—	September 18, 2006	Catalina	CSS	GEF	2.1 km	MPC · JPL
217498	2006 SS_{63}	—	September 18, 2006	Catalina	CSS	·	970 m	MPC · JPL
217499	2006 SW_{63}	—	September 20, 2006	Palomar	NEAT	·	1.2 km	MPC · JPL
217500	2006 SA_{314}	—	September 27, 2006	Kitt Peak	Spacewatch	·	900 m	MPC · JPL

== 217501–217600 ==
back to top

Designation			Discovery			Properties		Ref
Permanent	Provisional	Named after	Date	Site	Discoverer(s)	Category	Diam.	Ref
217501	2006 SU_{351}	—	September 30, 2006	Catalina	CSS	·	700 m	MPC · JPL
217502	2006 SA_{392}	—	September 19, 2006	Kitt Peak	Spacewatch	·	920 m	MPC · JPL
217503	2006 SL_{406}	—	September 19, 2006	Kitt Peak	Spacewatch	·	1.7 km	MPC · JPL
217504	2006 TK_{4}	—	October 2, 2006	Mount Lemmon	Mount Lemmon Survey	V	880 m	MPC · JPL
217505	2006 TQ_{11}	—	October 3, 2006	Socorro	LINEAR	·	3.4 km	MPC · JPL
217506	2006 TM_{55}	—	October 12, 2006	Palomar	NEAT	·	1.0 km	MPC · JPL
217507	2006 TS_{62}	—	October 10, 2006	Palomar	NEAT	·	3.4 km	MPC · JPL
217508	2006 TE_{103}	—	October 15, 2006	Kitt Peak	Spacewatch	·	1.5 km	MPC · JPL
217509	2006 TG_{109}	—	October 3, 2006	Mount Lemmon	Mount Lemmon Survey	·	2.8 km	MPC · JPL
217510 Dewaldroode	2006 TY_{111}	Dewaldroode	October 1, 2006	Apache Point	A. C. Becker	PHO	1.9 km	MPC · JPL
217511	2006 UP_{1}	—	October 16, 2006	Goodricke-Pigott	R. A. Tucker	·	1.0 km	MPC · JPL
217512	2006 UU_{4}	—	October 16, 2006	Kitt Peak	Spacewatch	·	810 m	MPC · JPL
217513	2006 UC_{78}	—	October 17, 2006	Kitt Peak	Spacewatch	·	810 m	MPC · JPL
217514	2006 UQ_{99}	—	October 18, 2006	Kitt Peak	Spacewatch	·	880 m	MPC · JPL
217515	2006 UR_{99}	—	October 18, 2006	Kitt Peak	Spacewatch	·	1.2 km	MPC · JPL
217516	2006 UR_{140}	—	October 19, 2006	Kitt Peak	Spacewatch	·	1.1 km	MPC · JPL
217517	2006 UZ_{143}	—	October 19, 2006	Kitt Peak	Spacewatch	·	1.0 km	MPC · JPL
217518	2006 UL_{187}	—	October 19, 2006	Catalina	CSS	·	6.1 km	MPC · JPL
217519	2006 UB_{191}	—	October 19, 2006	Catalina	CSS	V	990 m	MPC · JPL
217520	2006 UC_{191}	—	October 19, 2006	Catalina	CSS	·	1.2 km	MPC · JPL
217521	2006 UL_{225}	—	October 19, 2006	Catalina	CSS	V	1.1 km	MPC · JPL
217522	2006 UN_{328}	—	October 18, 2006	Kitt Peak	Spacewatch	·	1.7 km	MPC · JPL
217523	2006 VV_{50}	—	November 10, 2006	Kitt Peak	Spacewatch	·	2.3 km	MPC · JPL
217524	2006 VA_{69}	—	November 11, 2006	Kitt Peak	Spacewatch	NYS	1.7 km	MPC · JPL
217525	2006 VJ_{151}	—	November 9, 2006	Palomar	NEAT	·	1.2 km	MPC · JPL
217526	2006 VB_{169}	—	November 1, 2006	Mount Lemmon	Mount Lemmon Survey	·	1.6 km	MPC · JPL
217527	2006 WS_{62}	—	November 17, 2006	Mount Lemmon	Mount Lemmon Survey	·	2.2 km	MPC · JPL
217528	2006 WW_{68}	—	November 17, 2006	Mount Lemmon	Mount Lemmon Survey	·	990 m	MPC · JPL
217529	2006 WA_{157}	—	November 22, 2006	Catalina	CSS	·	1.2 km	MPC · JPL
217530	2006 WJ_{188}	—	November 24, 2006	Kitt Peak	Spacewatch	NYS	1.7 km	MPC · JPL
217531	2006 WR_{190}	—	November 25, 2006	Kitt Peak	Spacewatch	·	2.1 km	MPC · JPL
217532	2006 WU_{201}	—	November 23, 2006	Mount Lemmon	Mount Lemmon Survey	·	2.1 km	MPC · JPL
217533	2006 XK_{61}	—	December 15, 2006	Socorro	LINEAR	·	2.7 km	MPC · JPL
217534	2006 YW_{33}	—	December 21, 2006	Kitt Peak	Spacewatch	·	2.1 km	MPC · JPL
217535	2006 YC_{42}	—	December 22, 2006	Socorro	LINEAR	·	2.4 km	MPC · JPL
217536	2006 YB_{48}	—	December 24, 2006	Mount Lemmon	Mount Lemmon Survey	·	5.5 km	MPC · JPL
217537	2006 YU_{48}	—	December 25, 2006	Catalina	CSS	·	3.6 km	MPC · JPL
217538	2006 YB_{49}	—	December 24, 2006	Kitt Peak	Spacewatch	·	2.0 km	MPC · JPL
217539	2007 AS_{13}	—	January 9, 2007	Mount Lemmon	Mount Lemmon Survey	·	3.8 km	MPC · JPL
217540	2007 BS_{3}	—	January 16, 2007	Socorro	LINEAR	·	2.8 km	MPC · JPL
217541	2007 BZ_{20}	—	January 18, 2007	Palomar	NEAT	PHO	5.2 km	MPC · JPL
217542	2007 BA_{21}	—	January 21, 2007	Socorro	LINEAR	GAL	2.3 km	MPC · JPL
217543	2007 CC_{29}	—	February 6, 2007	Mount Lemmon	Mount Lemmon Survey	GEF	2.1 km	MPC · JPL
217544	2007 CY_{38}	—	February 6, 2007	Mount Lemmon	Mount Lemmon Survey	·	3.6 km	MPC · JPL
217545	2007 DM_{1}	—	February 17, 2007	Mount Lemmon	Mount Lemmon Survey	·	4.8 km	MPC · JPL
217546	2007 DC_{65}	—	February 21, 2007	Kitt Peak	Spacewatch	·	4.3 km	MPC · JPL
217547	2007 DB_{86}	—	February 21, 2007	Mount Lemmon	Mount Lemmon Survey	·	5.3 km	MPC · JPL
217548	2007 EW_{209}	—	March 15, 2007	Catalina	CSS	L5	17 km	MPC · JPL
217549	2007 FP_{31}	—	March 20, 2007	Kitt Peak	Spacewatch	MAR	1.8 km	MPC · JPL
217550	2007 GB_{24}	—	April 11, 2007	Kitt Peak	Spacewatch	·	3.7 km	MPC · JPL
217551	2007 GC_{24}	—	April 11, 2007	Kitt Peak	Spacewatch	NYS	1.1 km	MPC · JPL
217552	2007 GA_{25}	—	April 12, 2007	Siding Spring	SSS	·	2.4 km	MPC · JPL
217553	2007 GA_{47}	—	April 14, 2007	Kitt Peak	Spacewatch	·	3.4 km	MPC · JPL
217554	2007 HJ_{21}	—	April 18, 2007	Kitt Peak	Spacewatch	·	5.9 km	MPC · JPL
217555	2007 HC_{28}	—	April 18, 2007	Kitt Peak	Spacewatch	·	3.1 km	MPC · JPL
217556	2007 HB_{63}	—	April 22, 2007	Mount Lemmon	Mount Lemmon Survey	·	880 m	MPC · JPL
217557	2007 JX_{4}	—	May 7, 2007	Kitt Peak	Spacewatch	·	1.7 km	MPC · JPL
217558	2007 JB_{22}	—	May 11, 2007	Kitt Peak	Spacewatch	·	5.8 km	MPC · JPL
217559	2007 MS_{14}	—	June 20, 2007	Kitt Peak	Spacewatch	·	1 km	MPC · JPL
217560	2007 OG	—	July 16, 2007	La Sagra	OAM	·	1.8 km	MPC · JPL
217561	2007 OQ_{2}	—	July 20, 2007	Tiki	S. F. Hönig, Teamo, N.	·	1.6 km	MPC · JPL
217562	2007 PO_{5}	—	August 6, 2007	Lulin	LUSS	·	2.1 km	MPC · JPL
217563	2007 PJ_{17}	—	August 9, 2007	Socorro	LINEAR	·	2.0 km	MPC · JPL
217564	2007 PC_{27}	—	August 9, 2007	Palomar	Palomar	·	2.1 km	MPC · JPL
217565	2007 RR_{32}	—	September 5, 2007	Catalina	CSS	SUL	3.1 km	MPC · JPL
217566	2007 RU_{36}	—	September 8, 2007	Anderson Mesa	LONEOS	THM	3.6 km	MPC · JPL
217567	2007 TS_{81}	—	October 7, 2007	Catalina	CSS	·	1.6 km	MPC · JPL
217568	2007 TC_{111}	—	October 8, 2007	Catalina	CSS	·	1.9 km	MPC · JPL
217569	2007 TQ_{324}	—	October 11, 2007	Kitt Peak	Spacewatch	·	1.4 km	MPC · JPL
217570	2007 TQ_{412}	—	October 14, 2007	Catalina	CSS	·	4.8 km	MPC · JPL
217571	2007 UJ_{63}	—	October 30, 2007	Mount Lemmon	Mount Lemmon Survey	THM	2.5 km	MPC · JPL
217572	2007 VM_{91}	—	November 8, 2007	Mount Lemmon	Mount Lemmon Survey	BAR	2.0 km	MPC · JPL
217573	2007 VE_{193}	—	November 4, 2007	Mount Lemmon	Mount Lemmon Survey	(12739)	2.2 km	MPC · JPL
217574	2007 VN_{279}	—	November 14, 2007	Kitt Peak	Spacewatch	THM	4.4 km	MPC · JPL
217575	2007 VK_{301}	—	November 15, 2007	Catalina	CSS	EUN	1.7 km	MPC · JPL
217576 Klausbirkner	2007 YX_{56}	Klausbirkner	December 29, 2007	Mülheim-Ruhr	Martin, A., Boeker, A.	·	2.6 km	MPC · JPL
217577	2008 AC_{114}	—	January 10, 2008	Kitt Peak	Spacewatch	MAS	930 m	MPC · JPL
217578	2008 AC_{128}	—	January 11, 2008	Mount Lemmon	Mount Lemmon Survey	·	1.1 km	MPC · JPL
217579	2008 BC_{32}	—	January 30, 2008	Mount Lemmon	Mount Lemmon Survey	NYS	1.7 km	MPC · JPL
217580	2008 CK_{8}	—	February 2, 2008	Kitt Peak	Spacewatch	MAS	1.0 km	MPC · JPL
217581	2008 CY_{24}	—	February 1, 2008	Kitt Peak	Spacewatch	·	2.0 km	MPC · JPL
217582	2008 CV_{25}	—	February 1, 2008	Kitt Peak	Spacewatch	·	4.1 km	MPC · JPL
217583	2008 CL_{86}	—	February 7, 2008	Mount Lemmon	Mount Lemmon Survey	·	1.5 km	MPC · JPL
217584	2008 CP_{86}	—	February 7, 2008	Mount Lemmon	Mount Lemmon Survey	·	2.8 km	MPC · JPL
217585	2008 CR_{181}	—	February 12, 2008	Kitt Peak	Spacewatch	TIN	2.6 km	MPC · JPL
217586	2008 CR_{193}	—	February 8, 2008	Kitt Peak	Spacewatch	MAS	1 km	MPC · JPL
217587	2008 DL_{26}	—	February 26, 2008	Kitt Peak	Spacewatch	·	1.2 km	MPC · JPL
217588	2008 DM_{28}	—	February 26, 2008	Kitt Peak	Spacewatch	·	4.4 km	MPC · JPL
217589	2008 EC_{43}	—	March 4, 2008	Mount Lemmon	Mount Lemmon Survey	·	2.9 km	MPC · JPL
217590	2008 EJ_{45}	—	March 5, 2008	Kitt Peak	Spacewatch	·	2.3 km	MPC · JPL
217591	2008 EJ_{49}	—	March 6, 2008	Kitt Peak	Spacewatch	·	2.3 km	MPC · JPL
217592	2008 EK_{89}	—	March 8, 2008	Socorro	LINEAR	·	2.6 km	MPC · JPL
217593	2008 FK_{3}	—	March 25, 2008	Kitt Peak	Spacewatch	·	1.6 km	MPC · JPL
217594	2008 FZ_{55}	—	March 28, 2008	Kitt Peak	Spacewatch	·	2.4 km	MPC · JPL
217595	2008 FL_{61}	—	March 30, 2008	Catalina	CSS	·	2.6 km	MPC · JPL
217596	2008 GA_{42}	—	April 4, 2008	Kitt Peak	Spacewatch	AGN	1.7 km	MPC · JPL
217597	2008 GA_{127}	—	April 14, 2008	Mount Lemmon	Mount Lemmon Survey	·	5.4 km	MPC · JPL
217598	2008 GF_{137}	—	April 4, 2008	Catalina	CSS	·	3.4 km	MPC · JPL
217599	2008 HV_{7}	—	April 24, 2008	Kitt Peak	Spacewatch	·	4.1 km	MPC · JPL
217600	2008 JD_{6}	—	May 1, 2008	Catalina	CSS	·	2.9 km	MPC · JPL

== 217601–217700 ==
back to top

Designation			Discovery			Properties		Ref
Permanent	Provisional	Named after	Date	Site	Discoverer(s)	Category	Diam.	Ref
217601	2008 JZ_{14}	—	May 6, 2008	Wildberg	R. Apitzsch	NEM	3.5 km	MPC · JPL
217602	2008 JH_{15}	—	May 1, 2008	Kitt Peak	Spacewatch	·	2.1 km	MPC · JPL
217603 Grove Creek	2008 JW_{20}	Grove Creek	May 9, 2008	Grove Creek	Tozzi, F.	·	5.6 km	MPC · JPL
217604	2008 KY_{24}	—	May 28, 2008	Kitt Peak	Spacewatch	T_{j} (2.95) · 3:2	8.5 km	MPC · JPL
217605	2008 KM_{27}	—	May 30, 2008	Kitt Peak	Spacewatch	·	2.3 km	MPC · JPL
217606	2008 RU_{89}	—	September 5, 2008	Kitt Peak	Spacewatch	V	1.0 km	MPC · JPL
217607	2008 RP_{119}	—	September 7, 2008	Catalina	CSS	EOS	3.2 km	MPC · JPL
217608	2008 SG_{184}	—	September 24, 2008	Mount Lemmon	Mount Lemmon Survey	·	4.2 km	MPC · JPL
217609	2008 SW_{254}	—	September 23, 2008	Catalina	CSS	·	2.9 km	MPC · JPL
217610	2008 TW_{19}	—	October 1, 2008	Mount Lemmon	Mount Lemmon Survey	MAS	880 m	MPC · JPL
217611	2008 TN_{20}	—	October 1, 2008	Mount Lemmon	Mount Lemmon Survey	·	2.5 km	MPC · JPL
217612	2008 TD_{126}	—	October 8, 2008	Mount Lemmon	Mount Lemmon Survey	L4	19 km	MPC · JPL
217613	2008 UU_{46}	—	October 20, 2008	Kitt Peak	Spacewatch	HOF	3.6 km	MPC · JPL
217614	2008 UG_{185}	—	October 24, 2008	Kitt Peak	Spacewatch	·	3.6 km	MPC · JPL
217615	2008 UW_{200}	—	October 27, 2008	Socorro	LINEAR	·	5.4 km	MPC · JPL
217616	2008 UY_{273}	—	October 28, 2008	Kitt Peak	Spacewatch	·	2.9 km	MPC · JPL
217617	2008 UA_{342}	—	October 28, 2008	Kitt Peak	Spacewatch	·	2.6 km	MPC · JPL
217618	2008 VA_{19}	—	November 1, 2008	Kitt Peak	Spacewatch	·	2.5 km	MPC · JPL
217619	2008 VX_{31}	—	November 2, 2008	Mount Lemmon	Mount Lemmon Survey	NEM	3.5 km	MPC · JPL
217620	2009 BH_{10}	—	January 21, 2009	Sierra Stars	Tozzi, F.	H	820 m	MPC · JPL
217621	2009 BG_{156}	—	January 31, 2009	Kitt Peak	Spacewatch	·	1.3 km	MPC · JPL
217622	2009 GL_{5}	—	April 3, 2009	Catalina	CSS	·	2.1 km	MPC · JPL
217623	2009 HY_{59}	—	April 22, 2009	Mount Lemmon	Mount Lemmon Survey	MAS	810 m	MPC · JPL
217624	5003 T-2	—	September 25, 1973	Palomar	C. J. van Houten, I. van Houten-Groeneveld, T. Gehrels	·	1.8 km	MPC · JPL
217625	5408 T-2	—	September 30, 1973	Palomar	C. J. van Houten, I. van Houten-Groeneveld, T. Gehrels	·	2.7 km	MPC · JPL
217626	1027 T-3	—	October 17, 1977	Palomar	C. J. van Houten, I. van Houten-Groeneveld, T. Gehrels	·	3.6 km	MPC · JPL
217627	1064 T-3	—	October 17, 1977	Palomar	C. J. van Houten, I. van Houten-Groeneveld, T. Gehrels	·	1.3 km	MPC · JPL
217628 Lugh	1990 HA	Lugh	April 17, 1990	Kleť	A. Mrkos	APO +1km · PHA	1.4 km	MPC · JPL
217629	1992 SJ_{5}	—	September 25, 1992	Kitt Peak	Spacewatch	·	2.6 km	MPC · JPL
217630	1993 BQ_{9}	—	January 22, 1993	Kitt Peak	Spacewatch	MAS	1.0 km	MPC · JPL
217631	1993 TG_{15}	—	October 9, 1993	La Silla	E. W. Elst	·	4.1 km	MPC · JPL
217632	1993 TA_{25}	—	October 9, 1993	La Silla	E. W. Elst	HYG	3.7 km	MPC · JPL
217633	1995 VQ_{4}	—	November 14, 1995	Kitt Peak	Spacewatch	·	1.2 km	MPC · JPL
217634	1995 VQ_{8}	—	November 14, 1995	Kitt Peak	Spacewatch	MAS	880 m	MPC · JPL
217635	1996 GV_{7}	—	April 12, 1996	Kitt Peak	Spacewatch	·	3.7 km	MPC · JPL
217636	1996 PH_{3}	—	August 14, 1996	Haleakala	AMOS	H	850 m	MPC · JPL
217637	1996 VT_{10}	—	November 4, 1996	Kitt Peak	Spacewatch	·	1.0 km	MPC · JPL
217638	1996 XS_{8}	—	December 7, 1996	Kitt Peak	Spacewatch	·	2.6 km	MPC · JPL
217639	1996 XH_{20}	—	December 4, 1996	Kitt Peak	Spacewatch	·	1.7 km	MPC · JPL
217640	1997 EQ_{26}	—	March 4, 1997	Kitt Peak	Spacewatch	NYS	1.7 km	MPC · JPL
217641	1997 ND_{6}	—	July 9, 1997	Kitt Peak	Spacewatch	HYG	3.8 km	MPC · JPL
217642	1997 UD_{22}	—	October 31, 1997	Xinglong	SCAP	·	1.7 km	MPC · JPL
217643	1997 WN_{10}	—	November 22, 1997	Kitt Peak	Spacewatch	·	1.7 km	MPC · JPL
217644	1998 DE_{31}	—	February 28, 1998	Kitt Peak	Spacewatch	·	2.2 km	MPC · JPL
217645	1998 FJ_{14}	—	March 22, 1998	Socorro	LINEAR	H	790 m	MPC · JPL
217646	1998 KQ_{26}	—	May 27, 1998	Kitt Peak	Spacewatch	·	4.2 km	MPC · JPL
217647	1998 OR_{11}	—	July 26, 1998	La Silla	E. W. Elst	PHO	1.4 km	MPC · JPL
217648	1998 QB_{20}	—	August 17, 1998	Socorro	LINEAR	·	5.3 km	MPC · JPL
217649	1998 QH_{20}	—	August 17, 1998	Socorro	LINEAR	LIX	5.5 km	MPC · JPL
217650	1998 QN_{29}	—	August 23, 1998	Xinglong	SCAP	TIR	3.8 km	MPC · JPL
217651	1998 QF_{35}	—	August 17, 1998	Socorro	LINEAR	TIR	4.2 km	MPC · JPL
217652	1998 QX_{41}	—	August 17, 1998	Socorro	LINEAR	·	2.3 km	MPC · JPL
217653	1998 QA_{75}	—	August 24, 1998	Socorro	LINEAR	THB	3.7 km	MPC · JPL
217654	1998 RM_{1}	—	September 14, 1998	Socorro	LINEAR	H	840 m	MPC · JPL
217655	1998 RW_{10}	—	September 13, 1998	Kitt Peak	Spacewatch	V	1 km	MPC · JPL
217656	1998 RY_{43}	—	September 14, 1998	Socorro	LINEAR	NYS	1.9 km	MPC · JPL
217657	1998 RF_{61}	—	September 14, 1998	Socorro	LINEAR	·	6.3 km	MPC · JPL
217658	1998 RB_{81}	—	September 15, 1998	Anderson Mesa	LONEOS	·	1.3 km	MPC · JPL
217659	1998 SP_{20}	—	September 21, 1998	Kitt Peak	Spacewatch	·	1.2 km	MPC · JPL
217660	1998 SD_{32}	—	September 21, 1998	Kitt Peak	Spacewatch	THM	3.6 km	MPC · JPL
217661	1998 SK_{54}	—	September 16, 1998	Anderson Mesa	LONEOS	LIX	6.5 km	MPC · JPL
217662	1998 SM_{68}	—	September 19, 1998	Socorro	LINEAR	·	1.8 km	MPC · JPL
217663	1998 SD_{77}	—	September 26, 1998	Socorro	LINEAR	HYG	5.0 km	MPC · JPL
217664	1998 SQ_{99}	—	September 26, 1998	Socorro	LINEAR	URS	4.5 km	MPC · JPL
217665	1998 SX_{109}	—	September 26, 1998	Socorro	LINEAR	EUP	4.7 km	MPC · JPL
217666	1998 SJ_{116}	—	September 26, 1998	Socorro	LINEAR	T_{j} (2.99)	7.9 km	MPC · JPL
217667	1998 ST_{127}	—	September 26, 1998	Socorro	LINEAR	·	1.9 km	MPC · JPL
217668	1998 UG_{1}	—	October 19, 1998	Catalina	CSS	EUP	7.5 km	MPC · JPL
217669	1998 UH_{6}	—	October 22, 1998	Caussols	ODAS	·	1.6 km	MPC · JPL
217670	1998 UQ_{6}	—	October 22, 1998	Dominion	D. D. Balam	L4	10 km	MPC · JPL
217671	1998 UH_{24}	—	October 17, 1998	Anderson Mesa	LONEOS	·	2.2 km	MPC · JPL
217672	1998 UD_{28}	—	October 29, 1998	Socorro	LINEAR	EUP	7.0 km	MPC · JPL
217673	1998 UP_{30}	—	October 18, 1998	La Silla	E. W. Elst	·	1.5 km	MPC · JPL
217674	1998 VU_{40}	—	November 14, 1998	Kitt Peak	Spacewatch	V	1.2 km	MPC · JPL
217675	1998 WL_{42}	—	November 19, 1998	Caussols	ODAS	·	3.9 km	MPC · JPL
217676	1999 AM_{18}	—	January 13, 1999	Kitt Peak	Spacewatch	·	4.3 km	MPC · JPL
217677	1999 BW_{30}	—	January 19, 1999	Kitt Peak	Spacewatch	·	1.9 km	MPC · JPL
217678	1999 CY_{10}	—	February 12, 1999	Socorro	LINEAR	·	3.2 km	MPC · JPL
217679	1999 CT_{80}	—	February 12, 1999	Socorro	LINEAR	·	3.1 km	MPC · JPL
217680	1999 CC_{86}	—	February 10, 1999	Socorro	LINEAR	·	2.6 km	MPC · JPL
217681	1999 JS_{29}	—	May 10, 1999	Socorro	LINEAR	·	3.1 km	MPC · JPL
217682	1999 RO_{26}	—	September 7, 1999	Socorro	LINEAR	PHO	1.9 km	MPC · JPL
217683	1999 RP_{36}	—	September 11, 1999	Anderson Mesa	LONEOS	·	490 m	MPC · JPL
217684	1999 RT_{61}	—	September 7, 1999	Socorro	LINEAR	·	1.0 km	MPC · JPL
217685	1999 RG_{78}	—	September 7, 1999	Socorro	LINEAR	·	1.3 km	MPC · JPL
217686	1999 RY_{90}	—	September 7, 1999	Socorro	LINEAR	·	1.3 km	MPC · JPL
217687	1999 RT_{91}	—	September 7, 1999	Socorro	LINEAR	·	1.4 km	MPC · JPL
217688	1999 RS_{164}	—	September 9, 1999	Socorro	LINEAR	·	980 m	MPC · JPL
217689	1999 RH_{181}	—	September 14, 1999	Kitt Peak	Spacewatch	KOR	2.0 km	MPC · JPL
217690	1999 RW_{207}	—	September 8, 1999	Socorro	LINEAR	·	2.5 km	MPC · JPL
217691	1999 RD_{209}	—	September 8, 1999	Socorro	LINEAR	(2076)	1.1 km	MPC · JPL
217692	1999 RZ_{210}	—	September 8, 1999	Socorro	LINEAR	·	4.6 km	MPC · JPL
217693	1999 RY_{217}	—	September 4, 1999	Catalina	CSS	·	2.7 km	MPC · JPL
217694	1999 RP_{225}	—	September 3, 1999	Kitt Peak	Spacewatch	·	2.7 km	MPC · JPL
217695	1999 RT_{242}	—	September 4, 1999	Anderson Mesa	LONEOS	PHO	2.4 km	MPC · JPL
217696	1999 SO_{3}	—	September 24, 1999	Socorro	LINEAR	·	3.2 km	MPC · JPL
217697	1999 SU_{15}	—	September 30, 1999	Catalina	CSS	V	1.3 km	MPC · JPL
217698	1999 TG_{9}	—	October 7, 1999	Višnjan	K. Korlević, M. Jurić	·	2.4 km	MPC · JPL
217699	1999 TD_{50}	—	October 4, 1999	Kitt Peak	Spacewatch	·	2.5 km	MPC · JPL
217700	1999 TA_{60}	—	October 7, 1999	Kitt Peak	Spacewatch	KOR	1.8 km	MPC · JPL

== 217701–217800 ==
back to top

Designation			Discovery			Properties		Ref
Permanent	Provisional	Named after	Date	Site	Discoverer(s)	Category	Diam.	Ref
217701	1999 TD_{82}	—	October 12, 1999	Kitt Peak	Spacewatch	·	850 m	MPC · JPL
217702	1999 TO_{108}	—	October 4, 1999	Socorro	LINEAR	·	3.2 km	MPC · JPL
217703	1999 TH_{130}	—	October 6, 1999	Socorro	LINEAR	EOS	3.3 km	MPC · JPL
217704	1999 TN_{137}	—	October 6, 1999	Socorro	LINEAR	·	730 m	MPC · JPL
217705	1999 TG_{184}	—	October 12, 1999	Socorro	LINEAR	·	3.1 km	MPC · JPL
217706	1999 TK_{189}	—	October 12, 1999	Socorro	LINEAR	·	3.8 km	MPC · JPL
217707	1999 TM_{192}	—	October 12, 1999	Socorro	LINEAR	EMA	4.8 km	MPC · JPL
217708	1999 TA_{196}	—	October 12, 1999	Socorro	LINEAR	·	1.4 km	MPC · JPL
217709	1999 TY_{213}	—	October 15, 1999	Socorro	LINEAR	·	2.0 km	MPC · JPL
217710	1999 TJ_{233}	—	October 3, 1999	Socorro	LINEAR	H	850 m	MPC · JPL
217711	1999 TA_{244}	—	October 7, 1999	Catalina	CSS	·	3.0 km	MPC · JPL
217712	1999 TV_{255}	—	October 9, 1999	Kitt Peak	Spacewatch	KOR	2.2 km	MPC · JPL
217713	1999 TX_{269}	—	October 3, 1999	Socorro	LINEAR	·	890 m	MPC · JPL
217714	1999 UG_{52}	—	October 31, 1999	Catalina	CSS	(2076)	1.1 km	MPC · JPL
217715	1999 VF_{15}	—	November 2, 1999	Kitt Peak	Spacewatch	·	3.0 km	MPC · JPL
217716	1999 VB_{80}	—	November 4, 1999	Socorro	LINEAR	·	970 m	MPC · JPL
217717	1999 VC_{81}	—	November 9, 1999	Catalina	CSS	TEL	2.7 km	MPC · JPL
217718	1999 VG_{97}	—	November 9, 1999	Socorro	LINEAR	·	1.5 km	MPC · JPL
217719	1999 VC_{101}	—	November 9, 1999	Socorro	LINEAR	·	4.1 km	MPC · JPL
217720	1999 VA_{105}	—	November 9, 1999	Socorro	LINEAR	·	5.1 km	MPC · JPL
217721	1999 VV_{119}	—	November 3, 1999	Kitt Peak	Spacewatch	·	3.4 km	MPC · JPL
217722	1999 VJ_{154}	—	November 12, 1999	Kitt Peak	Spacewatch	·	2.8 km	MPC · JPL
217723	1999 VJ_{165}	—	November 14, 1999	Socorro	LINEAR	·	890 m	MPC · JPL
217724	1999 VS_{170}	—	November 14, 1999	Socorro	LINEAR	·	4.4 km	MPC · JPL
217725	1999 VL_{178}	—	November 6, 1999	Socorro	LINEAR	·	980 m	MPC · JPL
217726 Kitabeppu	1999 WN	Kitabeppu	November 16, 1999	Kuma Kogen	A. Nakamura	·	1.2 km	MPC · JPL
217727	1999 XR_{56}	—	December 7, 1999	Socorro	LINEAR	·	1 km	MPC · JPL
217728	1999 XA_{64}	—	December 7, 1999	Socorro	LINEAR	·	4.6 km	MPC · JPL
217729	1999 XA_{79}	—	December 7, 1999	Socorro	LINEAR	EOS	3.3 km	MPC · JPL
217730	1999 XC_{114}	—	December 11, 1999	Socorro	LINEAR	·	3.6 km	MPC · JPL
217731	1999 XM_{118}	—	December 5, 1999	Catalina	CSS	·	6.7 km	MPC · JPL
217732	1999 XB_{148}	—	December 7, 1999	Kitt Peak	Spacewatch	(2076)	940 m	MPC · JPL
217733	1999 XP_{171}	—	December 10, 1999	Socorro	LINEAR	·	5.6 km	MPC · JPL
217734	1999 XF_{187}	—	December 12, 1999	Socorro	LINEAR	V	1.3 km	MPC · JPL
217735	2000 AG_{40}	—	January 3, 2000	Socorro	LINEAR	·	5.9 km	MPC · JPL
217736	2000 AE_{197}	—	January 8, 2000	Socorro	LINEAR	·	7.1 km	MPC · JPL
217737	2000 AF_{216}	—	January 8, 2000	Kitt Peak	Spacewatch	EOS	3.1 km	MPC · JPL
217738	2000 BO_{1}	—	January 27, 2000	Kitt Peak	Spacewatch	·	3.0 km	MPC · JPL
217739	2000 BY_{21}	—	January 29, 2000	Kitt Peak	Spacewatch	·	1.9 km	MPC · JPL
217740	2000 BQ_{30}	—	January 28, 2000	Kitt Peak	Spacewatch	fast	5.3 km	MPC · JPL
217741	2000 CC_{9}	—	February 2, 2000	Socorro	LINEAR	·	6.0 km	MPC · JPL
217742	2000 CU_{22}	—	February 2, 2000	Socorro	LINEAR	·	1.6 km	MPC · JPL
217743	2000 CK_{26}	—	February 2, 2000	Socorro	LINEAR	V	1.2 km	MPC · JPL
217744	2000 CK_{38}	—	February 3, 2000	Socorro	LINEAR	·	1.7 km	MPC · JPL
217745	2000 CU_{55}	—	February 4, 2000	Socorro	LINEAR	·	1.9 km	MPC · JPL
217746	2000 CU_{60}	—	February 2, 2000	Socorro	LINEAR	·	4.9 km	MPC · JPL
217747	2000 DS_{41}	—	February 29, 2000	Socorro	LINEAR	·	2.1 km	MPC · JPL
217748	2000 DQ_{88}	—	February 29, 2000	Socorro	LINEAR	H	820 m	MPC · JPL
217749	2000 EK_{66}	—	March 10, 2000	Socorro	LINEAR	·	2.0 km	MPC · JPL
217750	2000 EE_{138}	—	March 11, 2000	Socorro	LINEAR	·	2.2 km	MPC · JPL
217751	2000 GN_{24}	—	April 5, 2000	Socorro	LINEAR	V	870 m	MPC · JPL
217752	2000 GQ_{187}	—	April 12, 2000	Haleakala	NEAT	·	2.9 km	MPC · JPL
217753	2000 HT_{37}	—	April 29, 2000	Socorro	LINEAR	·	2.8 km	MPC · JPL
217754	2000 HA_{64}	—	April 26, 2000	Anderson Mesa	LONEOS	EUN	1.8 km	MPC · JPL
217755	2000 OP_{34}	—	July 30, 2000	Socorro	LINEAR	·	2.9 km	MPC · JPL
217756	2000 QW_{8}	—	August 25, 2000	Črni Vrh	Skvarč, J.	·	1.5 km	MPC · JPL
217757	2000 QO_{14}	—	August 24, 2000	Socorro	LINEAR	·	2.2 km	MPC · JPL
217758	2000 QP_{15}	—	August 24, 2000	Socorro	LINEAR	·	3.3 km	MPC · JPL
217759	2000 QP_{37}	—	August 24, 2000	Socorro	LINEAR	·	3.6 km	MPC · JPL
217760	2000 QY_{106}	—	August 29, 2000	Socorro	LINEAR	·	3.3 km	MPC · JPL
217761	2000 QW_{107}	—	August 29, 2000	Socorro	LINEAR	·	2.6 km	MPC · JPL
217762	2000 QY_{119}	—	August 25, 2000	Socorro	LINEAR	EUN	2.1 km	MPC · JPL
217763	2000 QL_{123}	—	August 25, 2000	Socorro	LINEAR	·	4.7 km	MPC · JPL
217764	2000 QC_{162}	—	August 31, 2000	Socorro	LINEAR	·	3.4 km	MPC · JPL
217765	2000 QK_{167}	—	August 31, 2000	Socorro	LINEAR	·	2.8 km	MPC · JPL
217766	2000 QF_{172}	—	August 31, 2000	Socorro	LINEAR	·	2.5 km	MPC · JPL
217767	2000 QU_{204}	—	August 31, 2000	Socorro	LINEAR	·	2.4 km	MPC · JPL
217768	2000 QD_{223}	—	August 21, 2000	Anderson Mesa	LONEOS	·	3.4 km	MPC · JPL
217769	2000 QN_{243}	—	August 20, 2000	Anderson Mesa	LONEOS	·	2.9 km	MPC · JPL
217770	2000 RB_{8}	—	September 2, 2000	Eskridge	G. Hug	·	3.2 km	MPC · JPL
217771	2000 RJ_{30}	—	September 1, 2000	Socorro	LINEAR	·	2.2 km	MPC · JPL
217772	2000 RJ_{48}	—	September 3, 2000	Socorro	LINEAR	·	3.6 km	MPC · JPL
217773	2000 RO_{76}	—	September 4, 2000	Socorro	LINEAR	(1547)	2.5 km	MPC · JPL
217774	2000 RV_{76}	—	September 4, 2000	Socorro	LINEAR	JUN · slow	2.8 km	MPC · JPL
217775	2000 RK_{83}	—	September 1, 2000	Socorro	LINEAR	·	5.4 km	MPC · JPL
217776	2000 RS_{107}	—	September 7, 2000	Kitt Peak	Spacewatch	·	2.7 km	MPC · JPL
217777	2000 SY_{17}	—	September 23, 2000	Socorro	LINEAR	·	3.1 km	MPC · JPL
217778	2000 SM_{18}	—	September 23, 2000	Socorro	LINEAR	·	3.3 km	MPC · JPL
217779	2000 SS_{18}	—	September 23, 2000	Socorro	LINEAR	·	2.9 km	MPC · JPL
217780	2000 SL_{53}	—	September 24, 2000	Socorro	LINEAR	·	3.0 km	MPC · JPL
217781	2000 SR_{56}	—	September 24, 2000	Socorro	LINEAR	·	3.5 km	MPC · JPL
217782	2000 ST_{58}	—	September 24, 2000	Socorro	LINEAR	·	2.1 km	MPC · JPL
217783	2000 SE_{116}	—	September 24, 2000	Socorro	LINEAR	·	2.5 km	MPC · JPL
217784	2000 SF_{165}	—	September 23, 2000	Socorro	LINEAR	·	3.3 km	MPC · JPL
217785	2000 SZ_{196}	—	September 24, 2000	Socorro	LINEAR	·	2.5 km	MPC · JPL
217786	2000 SS_{206}	—	September 24, 2000	Socorro	LINEAR	·	3.2 km	MPC · JPL
217787	2000 SC_{262}	—	September 25, 2000	Socorro	LINEAR	·	2.2 km	MPC · JPL
217788	2000 SV_{280}	—	September 25, 2000	Socorro	LINEAR	·	4.7 km	MPC · JPL
217789	2000 SE_{281}	—	September 23, 2000	Socorro	LINEAR	·	2.7 km	MPC · JPL
217790	2000 SD_{301}	—	September 28, 2000	Socorro	LINEAR	·	3.1 km	MPC · JPL
217791	2000 SW_{311}	—	September 27, 2000	Socorro	LINEAR	·	4.4 km	MPC · JPL
217792	2000 SO_{352}	—	September 30, 2000	Anderson Mesa	LONEOS	·	3.4 km	MPC · JPL
217793	2000 TX_{37}	—	October 1, 2000	Socorro	LINEAR	·	3.0 km	MPC · JPL
217794	2000 TU_{40}	—	October 1, 2000	Socorro	LINEAR	·	3.8 km	MPC · JPL
217795	2000 TE_{46}	—	October 1, 2000	Anderson Mesa	LONEOS	AGN	1.7 km	MPC · JPL
217796	2000 TO_{64}	—	October 7, 2000	Anderson Mesa	LONEOS	T_{j} (2.8) · AMO +1km	1.3 km	MPC · JPL
217797	2000 UH_{48}	—	October 24, 2000	Socorro	LINEAR	·	3.1 km	MPC · JPL
217798	2000 UB_{69}	—	October 25, 2000	Socorro	LINEAR	·	3.6 km	MPC · JPL
217799	2000 UN_{71}	—	October 25, 2000	Socorro	LINEAR	·	4.3 km	MPC · JPL
217800	2000 UV_{93}	—	October 25, 2000	Socorro	LINEAR	·	3.3 km	MPC · JPL

== 217801–217900 ==
back to top

Designation			Discovery			Properties		Ref
Permanent	Provisional	Named after	Date	Site	Discoverer(s)	Category	Diam.	Ref
217801	2000 UM_{95}	—	October 25, 2000	Socorro	LINEAR	·	4.0 km	MPC · JPL
217802	2000 US_{96}	—	October 25, 2000	Socorro	LINEAR	·	3.5 km	MPC · JPL
217803	2000 WU_{13}	—	November 20, 2000	Socorro	LINEAR	·	4.1 km	MPC · JPL
217804	2000 WY_{119}	—	November 20, 2000	Socorro	LINEAR	·	3.4 km	MPC · JPL
217805	2000 XX_{8}	—	December 1, 2000	Socorro	LINEAR	·	3.9 km	MPC · JPL
217806	2000 XS_{43}	—	December 5, 2000	Socorro	LINEAR	MAR	2.0 km	MPC · JPL
217807	2000 XK_{44}	—	December 5, 2000	Socorro	LINEAR	AMO	750 m	MPC · JPL
217808	2000 YP_{58}	—	December 30, 2000	Socorro	LINEAR	·	1.1 km	MPC · JPL
217809	2000 YY_{110}	—	December 30, 2000	Socorro	LINEAR	·	3.4 km	MPC · JPL
217810	2000 YS_{127}	—	December 29, 2000	Haleakala	NEAT	·	3.0 km	MPC · JPL
217811	2001 AB_{19}	—	January 4, 2001	Haleakala	NEAT	·	5.3 km	MPC · JPL
217812	2001 AA_{32}	—	January 4, 2001	Socorro	LINEAR	·	3.1 km	MPC · JPL
217813	2001 BD_{19}	—	January 19, 2001	Socorro	LINEAR	·	1.2 km	MPC · JPL
217814	2001 BO_{46}	—	January 21, 2001	Socorro	LINEAR	·	3.1 km	MPC · JPL
217815	2001 BS_{54}	—	January 18, 2001	Haleakala	NEAT	EOS	3.4 km	MPC · JPL
217816	2001 DG_{14}	—	February 19, 2001	Socorro	LINEAR	PHO	1.9 km	MPC · JPL
217817	2001 DQ_{41}	—	February 19, 2001	Socorro	LINEAR	·	4.7 km	MPC · JPL
217818	2001 DC_{46}	—	February 19, 2001	Socorro	LINEAR	EOS	2.9 km	MPC · JPL
217819	2001 DJ_{53}	—	February 19, 2001	Socorro	LINEAR	·	4.5 km	MPC · JPL
217820	2001 DS_{68}	—	February 19, 2001	Socorro	LINEAR	·	5.6 km	MPC · JPL
217821	2001 DK_{111}	—	February 22, 2001	Kitt Peak	Spacewatch	·	1.6 km	MPC · JPL
217822	2001 FK_{47}	—	March 18, 2001	Socorro	LINEAR	·	1.9 km	MPC · JPL
217823	2001 FB_{66}	—	March 19, 2001	Socorro	LINEAR	·	1.4 km	MPC · JPL
217824	2001 FT_{76}	—	March 19, 2001	Socorro	LINEAR	ERI	3.1 km	MPC · JPL
217825	2001 FU_{88}	—	March 26, 2001	Kitt Peak	Spacewatch	NYS	1.3 km	MPC · JPL
217826	2001 FW_{119}	—	March 28, 2001	Kitt Peak	Spacewatch	·	4.6 km	MPC · JPL
217827	2001 FQ_{176}	—	March 16, 2001	Socorro	LINEAR	·	2.2 km	MPC · JPL
217828	2001 GT	—	April 13, 2001	Socorro	LINEAR	PHO	1.9 km	MPC · JPL
217829	2001 HJ_{20}	—	April 26, 2001	Socorro	LINEAR	H	950 m	MPC · JPL
217830	2001 HK_{47}	—	April 18, 2001	Haleakala	NEAT	·	1.7 km	MPC · JPL
217831	2001 JJ_{9}	—	May 15, 2001	Haleakala	NEAT	MAS	1.1 km	MPC · JPL
217832	2001 KN_{26}	—	May 17, 2001	Socorro	LINEAR	·	1.6 km	MPC · JPL
217833	2001 KC_{33}	—	May 23, 2001	Ondřejov	P. Pravec, P. Kušnirák	NYS	1.5 km	MPC · JPL
217834	2001 KB_{34}	—	May 18, 2001	Socorro	LINEAR	NYS	1.5 km	MPC · JPL
217835	2001 KO_{40}	—	May 23, 2001	Socorro	LINEAR	PHO	3.2 km	MPC · JPL
217836	2001 KS_{67}	—	May 30, 2001	Socorro	LINEAR	H	1.0 km	MPC · JPL
217837	2001 LC	—	June 1, 2001	Socorro	LINEAR	APO	500 m	MPC · JPL
217838	2001 LX_{7}	—	June 15, 2001	Palomar	NEAT	·	2.3 km	MPC · JPL
217839	2001 OC_{12}	—	July 20, 2001	Palomar	NEAT	H	1.0 km	MPC · JPL
217840	2001 OP_{14}	—	July 20, 2001	Socorro	LINEAR	·	2.0 km	MPC · JPL
217841	2001 OX_{23}	—	July 16, 2001	Anderson Mesa	LONEOS	·	2.4 km	MPC · JPL
217842	2001 OW_{31}	—	July 23, 2001	Palomar	NEAT	H	850 m	MPC · JPL
217843	2001 OV_{36}	—	July 20, 2001	Palomar	NEAT	·	2.0 km	MPC · JPL
217844	2001 OK_{77}	—	July 24, 2001	Palomar	NEAT	T_{j} (2.96) · 3:2	8.1 km	MPC · JPL
217845	2001 OK_{85}	—	July 20, 2001	Anderson Mesa	LONEOS	·	1.6 km	MPC · JPL
217846	2001 OO_{110}	—	July 16, 2001	Anderson Mesa	LONEOS	KON	3.9 km	MPC · JPL
217847	2001 PR_{41}	—	August 11, 2001	Palomar	NEAT	·	2.0 km	MPC · JPL
217848	2001 PW_{53}	—	August 14, 2001	Haleakala	NEAT	3:2	7.4 km	MPC · JPL
217849	2001 PC_{54}	—	August 14, 2001	Haleakala	NEAT	T_{j} (2.99) · 3:2	6.3 km	MPC · JPL
217850	2001 PC_{60}	—	August 13, 2001	Palomar	NEAT	·	1.5 km	MPC · JPL
217851	2001 QA_{35}	—	August 16, 2001	Socorro	LINEAR	H	770 m	MPC · JPL
217852	2001 QU_{49}	—	August 16, 2001	Socorro	LINEAR	·	1.5 km	MPC · JPL
217853	2001 QT_{56}	—	August 16, 2001	Socorro	LINEAR	3:2	9.5 km	MPC · JPL
217854	2001 QA_{80}	—	August 16, 2001	Socorro	LINEAR	·	1.8 km	MPC · JPL
217855	2001 QO_{80}	—	August 17, 2001	Socorro	LINEAR	·	1.6 km	MPC · JPL
217856	2001 QH_{87}	—	August 17, 2001	Palomar	NEAT	H	830 m	MPC · JPL
217857	2001 QW_{90}	—	August 22, 2001	Socorro	LINEAR	H	910 m	MPC · JPL
217858	2001 QV_{91}	—	August 19, 2001	Socorro	LINEAR	·	2.0 km	MPC · JPL
217859	2001 QC_{115}	—	August 17, 2001	Socorro	LINEAR	·	1.5 km	MPC · JPL
217860	2001 QB_{119}	—	August 17, 2001	Socorro	LINEAR	·	1.9 km	MPC · JPL
217861	2001 QY_{127}	—	August 20, 2001	Socorro	LINEAR	·	1.8 km	MPC · JPL
217862	2001 QL_{128}	—	August 20, 2001	Socorro	LINEAR	H	900 m	MPC · JPL
217863	2001 QF_{134}	—	August 21, 2001	Socorro	LINEAR	H	910 m	MPC · JPL
217864	2001 QT_{136}	—	August 22, 2001	Socorro	LINEAR	·	2.6 km	MPC · JPL
217865	2001 QF_{139}	—	August 22, 2001	Socorro	LINEAR	·	4.4 km	MPC · JPL
217866	2001 QP_{141}	—	August 24, 2001	Socorro	LINEAR	·	2.7 km	MPC · JPL
217867	2001 QD_{151}	—	August 23, 2001	Socorro	LINEAR	H	1.1 km	MPC · JPL
217868	2001 QT_{153}	—	August 26, 2001	Ondřejov	P. Kušnirák	·	1.6 km	MPC · JPL
217869	2001 QW_{159}	—	August 23, 2001	Anderson Mesa	LONEOS	·	1.6 km	MPC · JPL
217870	2001 QB_{191}	—	August 22, 2001	Socorro	LINEAR	·	2.7 km	MPC · JPL
217871	2001 QG_{191}	—	August 22, 2001	Goodricke-Pigott	R. A. Tucker	·	2.3 km	MPC · JPL
217872	2001 QF_{195}	—	August 22, 2001	Socorro	LINEAR	·	2.1 km	MPC · JPL
217873	2001 QN_{204}	—	August 23, 2001	Anderson Mesa	LONEOS	·	1.1 km	MPC · JPL
217874	2001 QQ_{208}	—	August 23, 2001	Anderson Mesa	LONEOS	·	2.7 km	MPC · JPL
217875	2001 QV_{219}	—	August 23, 2001	Socorro	LINEAR	EUN	2.2 km	MPC · JPL
217876	2001 QE_{221}	—	August 24, 2001	Anderson Mesa	LONEOS	·	1.8 km	MPC · JPL
217877	2001 QR_{225}	—	August 24, 2001	Anderson Mesa	LONEOS	T_{j} (2.98) · 3:2	10 km	MPC · JPL
217878	2001 QV_{245}	—	August 24, 2001	Socorro	LINEAR	(5)	1.5 km	MPC · JPL
217879	2001 QS_{248}	—	August 24, 2001	Socorro	LINEAR	(5)	2.0 km	MPC · JPL
217880	2001 QX_{269}	—	August 19, 2001	Socorro	LINEAR	H	790 m	MPC · JPL
217881	2001 QZ_{285}	—	August 23, 2001	Goodricke-Pigott	R. A. Tucker	·	1.9 km	MPC · JPL
217882	2001 QJ_{289}	—	August 16, 2001	Palomar	NEAT	·	1.5 km	MPC · JPL
217883	2001 QD_{295}	—	August 24, 2001	Socorro	LINEAR	·	2.9 km	MPC · JPL
217884	2001 RK_{42}	—	September 11, 2001	Socorro	LINEAR	EUN	1.3 km	MPC · JPL
217885	2001 RW_{73}	—	September 10, 2001	Socorro	LINEAR	KON	4.1 km	MPC · JPL
217886	2001 RM_{89}	—	September 11, 2001	Anderson Mesa	LONEOS	(5)	1.7 km	MPC · JPL
217887	2001 RV_{92}	—	September 11, 2001	Anderson Mesa	LONEOS	·	1.9 km	MPC · JPL
217888	2001 RA_{94}	—	September 11, 2001	Anderson Mesa	LONEOS	MAS	1.2 km	MPC · JPL
217889	2001 RH_{95}	—	September 7, 2001	Socorro	LINEAR	·	1.5 km	MPC · JPL
217890	2001 RG_{105}	—	September 12, 2001	Socorro	LINEAR	·	1.9 km	MPC · JPL
217891	2001 RN_{118}	—	September 12, 2001	Socorro	LINEAR	3:2 · SHU	7.4 km	MPC · JPL
217892	2001 RR_{119}	—	September 12, 2001	Socorro	LINEAR	·	1.4 km	MPC · JPL
217893	2001 RY_{121}	—	September 12, 2001	Socorro	LINEAR	·	1.5 km	MPC · JPL
217894	2001 RE_{143}	—	September 15, 2001	Palomar	NEAT	·	1.7 km	MPC · JPL
217895	2001 RV_{151}	—	September 11, 2001	Anderson Mesa	LONEOS	MAR	1.8 km	MPC · JPL
217896	2001 SB_{36}	—	September 16, 2001	Socorro	LINEAR	·	1.5 km	MPC · JPL
217897	2001 SW_{36}	—	September 16, 2001	Socorro	LINEAR	·	2.1 km	MPC · JPL
217898	2001 SH_{49}	—	September 16, 2001	Socorro	LINEAR	·	1.5 km	MPC · JPL
217899	2001 SQ_{49}	—	September 16, 2001	Socorro	LINEAR	(5)	1.4 km	MPC · JPL
217900	2001 SE_{65}	—	September 17, 2001	Socorro	LINEAR	·	1.1 km	MPC · JPL

== 217901–218000 ==
back to top

Designation			Discovery			Properties		Ref
Permanent	Provisional	Named after	Date	Site	Discoverer(s)	Category	Diam.	Ref
217901	2001 SJ_{70}	—	September 17, 2001	Socorro	LINEAR	·	1.6 km	MPC · JPL
217902	2001 SC_{73}	—	September 18, 2001	Socorro	LINEAR	H	880 m	MPC · JPL
217903	2001 SU_{82}	—	September 20, 2001	Socorro	LINEAR	·	1.5 km	MPC · JPL
217904	2001 SD_{107}	—	September 20, 2001	Socorro	LINEAR	EUN	1.8 km	MPC · JPL
217905	2001 SG_{109}	—	September 20, 2001	Socorro	LINEAR	·	3.9 km	MPC · JPL
217906	2001 SB_{125}	—	September 16, 2001	Socorro	LINEAR	3:2	9.6 km	MPC · JPL
217907	2001 SC_{141}	—	September 16, 2001	Socorro	LINEAR	·	1.9 km	MPC · JPL
217908	2001 SR_{142}	—	September 16, 2001	Socorro	LINEAR	·	1.1 km	MPC · JPL
217909	2001 SH_{148}	—	September 17, 2001	Socorro	LINEAR	(5)	1.2 km	MPC · JPL
217910	2001 SX_{157}	—	September 17, 2001	Socorro	LINEAR	(5)	1.8 km	MPC · JPL
217911	2001 SK_{175}	—	September 16, 2001	Socorro	LINEAR	·	1.0 km	MPC · JPL
217912	2001 SA_{178}	—	September 17, 2001	Socorro	LINEAR	KON	3.0 km	MPC · JPL
217913	2001 SC_{197}	—	September 19, 2001	Socorro	LINEAR	·	1.3 km	MPC · JPL
217914	2001 SR_{213}	—	September 19, 2001	Socorro	LINEAR	·	1.2 km	MPC · JPL
217915	2001 SY_{228}	—	September 19, 2001	Socorro	LINEAR	·	1.3 km	MPC · JPL
217916	2001 SD_{271}	—	September 20, 2001	Socorro	LINEAR	KON	3.1 km	MPC · JPL
217917	2001 SN_{313}	—	September 21, 2001	Socorro	LINEAR	·	2.2 km	MPC · JPL
217918	2001 SY_{315}	—	September 25, 2001	Socorro	LINEAR	·	2.7 km	MPC · JPL
217919	2001 SH_{316}	—	September 25, 2001	Socorro	LINEAR	·	4.5 km	MPC · JPL
217920	2001 ST_{316}	—	September 25, 2001	Socorro	LINEAR	EUN	2.0 km	MPC · JPL
217921	2001 SN_{324}	—	September 16, 2001	Socorro	LINEAR	·	1.4 km	MPC · JPL
217922	2001 SG_{339}	—	September 21, 2001	Palomar	NEAT	H	720 m	MPC · JPL
217923	2001 SR_{345}	—	September 23, 2001	Haleakala	NEAT	·	2.2 km	MPC · JPL
217924	2001 TK	—	October 6, 2001	Palomar	NEAT	·	1.3 km	MPC · JPL
217925	2001 TO_{3}	—	October 7, 2001	Palomar	NEAT	·	1.6 km	MPC · JPL
217926	2001 TW_{5}	—	October 10, 2001	Palomar	NEAT	·	1.5 km	MPC · JPL
217927	2001 TU_{13}	—	October 12, 2001	Goodricke-Pigott	R. A. Tucker	·	2.5 km	MPC · JPL
217928	2001 TL_{21}	—	October 11, 2001	Socorro	LINEAR	·	1.7 km	MPC · JPL
217929	2001 TT_{22}	—	October 13, 2001	Socorro	LINEAR	·	1.8 km	MPC · JPL
217930	2001 TG_{23}	—	October 14, 2001	Socorro	LINEAR	·	1.7 km	MPC · JPL
217931	2001 TL_{40}	—	October 14, 2001	Socorro	LINEAR	·	3.4 km	MPC · JPL
217932	2001 TP_{49}	—	October 15, 2001	Desert Eagle	W. K. Y. Yeung	(5)	1.6 km	MPC · JPL
217933	2001 TX_{69}	—	October 13, 2001	Socorro	LINEAR	·	1.9 km	MPC · JPL
217934	2001 TG_{74}	—	October 13, 2001	Socorro	LINEAR	(5)	1.9 km	MPC · JPL
217935	2001 TZ_{78}	—	October 13, 2001	Socorro	LINEAR	H	840 m	MPC · JPL
217936	2001 TJ_{96}	—	October 14, 2001	Socorro	LINEAR	·	2.0 km	MPC · JPL
217937	2001 TW_{106}	—	October 13, 2001	Socorro	LINEAR	·	2.3 km	MPC · JPL
217938	2001 TS_{107}	—	October 13, 2001	Socorro	LINEAR	(5)	2.6 km	MPC · JPL
217939	2001 TO_{123}	—	October 12, 2001	Haleakala	NEAT	·	1.8 km	MPC · JPL
217940	2001 TO_{132}	—	October 12, 2001	Haleakala	NEAT	·	2.1 km	MPC · JPL
217941	2001 TL_{141}	—	October 10, 2001	Palomar	NEAT	·	1.6 km	MPC · JPL
217942	2001 TF_{146}	—	October 10, 2001	Palomar	NEAT	·	1.9 km	MPC · JPL
217943	2001 TU_{191}	—	October 14, 2001	Socorro	LINEAR	·	1.9 km	MPC · JPL
217944	2001 TX_{210}	—	October 13, 2001	Palomar	NEAT	MAR	1.7 km	MPC · JPL
217945	2001 TG_{212}	—	October 13, 2001	Palomar	NEAT	(194)	2.3 km	MPC · JPL
217946	2001 TS_{217}	—	October 14, 2001	Socorro	LINEAR	·	1.4 km	MPC · JPL
217947	2001 TY_{226}	—	October 15, 2001	Palomar	NEAT	·	1.8 km	MPC · JPL
217948	2001 TT_{231}	—	October 15, 2001	Socorro	LINEAR	·	2.1 km	MPC · JPL
217949	2001 UN_{5}	—	October 21, 2001	Desert Eagle	W. K. Y. Yeung	·	2.2 km	MPC · JPL
217950	2001 UM_{15}	—	October 25, 2001	Desert Eagle	W. K. Y. Yeung	·	1.8 km	MPC · JPL
217951	2001 UC_{26}	—	October 18, 2001	Socorro	LINEAR	·	1.7 km	MPC · JPL
217952	2001 UK_{29}	—	October 16, 2001	Socorro	LINEAR	(5)	1.6 km	MPC · JPL
217953	2001 UG_{37}	—	October 17, 2001	Socorro	LINEAR	·	1.6 km	MPC · JPL
217954	2001 UP_{73}	—	October 17, 2001	Socorro	LINEAR	·	1.5 km	MPC · JPL
217955	2001 UV_{108}	—	October 20, 2001	Socorro	LINEAR	(5)	2.0 km	MPC · JPL
217956	2001 UJ_{109}	—	October 20, 2001	Socorro	LINEAR	(5)	1.7 km	MPC · JPL
217957	2001 UF_{131}	—	October 20, 2001	Socorro	LINEAR	·	1.7 km	MPC · JPL
217958	2001 UW_{140}	—	October 23, 2001	Socorro	LINEAR	·	1.6 km	MPC · JPL
217959	2001 UM_{154}	—	October 23, 2001	Socorro	LINEAR	·	2.3 km	MPC · JPL
217960	2001 UO_{157}	—	October 23, 2001	Socorro	LINEAR	·	1.9 km	MPC · JPL
217961	2001 UO_{167}	—	October 19, 2001	Socorro	LINEAR	·	2.3 km	MPC · JPL
217962	2001 UK_{193}	—	October 18, 2001	Socorro	LINEAR	·	2.7 km	MPC · JPL
217963	2001 UC_{204}	—	October 19, 2001	Palomar	NEAT	·	1.7 km	MPC · JPL
217964	2001 UZ_{212}	—	October 22, 2001	Socorro	LINEAR	EUN	1.3 km	MPC · JPL
217965	2001 UJ_{221}	—	October 23, 2001	Socorro	LINEAR	(5)	2.1 km	MPC · JPL
217966	2001 VT_{10}	—	November 10, 2001	Socorro	LINEAR	·	2.2 km	MPC · JPL
217967	2001 VQ_{20}	—	November 9, 2001	Socorro	LINEAR	·	1.7 km	MPC · JPL
217968	2001 VW_{23}	—	November 9, 2001	Socorro	LINEAR	·	1.8 km	MPC · JPL
217969	2001 VB_{24}	—	November 9, 2001	Socorro	LINEAR	·	1.8 km	MPC · JPL
217970	2001 VK_{25}	—	November 9, 2001	Socorro	LINEAR	·	1.8 km	MPC · JPL
217971	2001 VY_{25}	—	November 9, 2001	Socorro	LINEAR	·	5.4 km	MPC · JPL
217972	2001 VD_{26}	—	November 9, 2001	Socorro	LINEAR	EUN	2.1 km	MPC · JPL
217973	2001 VA_{31}	—	November 9, 2001	Socorro	LINEAR	·	2.7 km	MPC · JPL
217974	2001 VJ_{35}	—	November 9, 2001	Socorro	LINEAR	·	1.9 km	MPC · JPL
217975	2001 VY_{42}	—	November 9, 2001	Socorro	LINEAR	MAR	2.0 km	MPC · JPL
217976	2001 VR_{44}	—	November 9, 2001	Socorro	LINEAR	·	2.7 km	MPC · JPL
217977	2001 VK_{51}	—	November 10, 2001	Socorro	LINEAR	·	1.7 km	MPC · JPL
217978	2001 VQ_{73}	—	November 12, 2001	Kitt Peak	Spacewatch	·	2.3 km	MPC · JPL
217979	2001 VG_{78}	—	November 15, 2001	Haleakala	NEAT	·	4.9 km	MPC · JPL
217980	2001 VJ_{85}	—	November 12, 2001	Socorro	LINEAR	·	2.6 km	MPC · JPL
217981	2001 VN_{88}	—	November 15, 2001	Palomar	NEAT	EUN	1.5 km	MPC · JPL
217982	2001 VY_{94}	—	November 15, 2001	Socorro	LINEAR	·	2.9 km	MPC · JPL
217983	2001 VT_{98}	—	November 15, 2001	Socorro	LINEAR	·	2.5 km	MPC · JPL
217984	2001 VD_{108}	—	November 12, 2001	Socorro	LINEAR	·	2.8 km	MPC · JPL
217985	2001 VB_{116}	—	November 12, 2001	Socorro	LINEAR	·	3.4 km	MPC · JPL
217986	2001 VN_{124}	—	November 9, 2001	Socorro	LINEAR	·	2.2 km	MPC · JPL
217987	2001 VG_{131}	—	November 11, 2001	Apache Point	SDSS	slow	2.9 km	MPC · JPL
217988	2001 WT_{19}	—	November 17, 2001	Socorro	LINEAR	·	3.2 km	MPC · JPL
217989	2001 WU_{46}	—	November 19, 2001	Socorro	LINEAR	·	2.6 km	MPC · JPL
217990	2001 WA_{55}	—	November 19, 2001	Socorro	LINEAR	·	1.8 km	MPC · JPL
217991	2001 WN_{55}	—	November 19, 2001	Socorro	LINEAR	HIL · 3:2	7.3 km	MPC · JPL
217992	2001 WM_{64}	—	November 19, 2001	Socorro	LINEAR	PAD	2.7 km	MPC · JPL
217993	2001 WE_{84}	—	November 20, 2001	Socorro	LINEAR	WIT	1.3 km	MPC · JPL
217994	2001 WD_{100}	—	November 24, 2001	Socorro	LINEAR	·	2.0 km	MPC · JPL
217995	2001 WE_{100}	—	November 24, 2001	Socorro	LINEAR	·	3.3 km	MPC · JPL
217996	2001 XD_{14}	—	December 9, 2001	Socorro	LINEAR	JUN	1.9 km	MPC · JPL
217997	2001 XY_{14}	—	December 9, 2001	Socorro	LINEAR	RAF	1.9 km	MPC · JPL
217998	2001 XU_{16}	—	December 9, 2001	Socorro	LINEAR	·	3.0 km	MPC · JPL
217999	2001 XH_{54}	—	December 11, 2001	Socorro	LINEAR	EUN	2.0 km	MPC · JPL
218000	2001 XD_{71}	—	December 11, 2001	Socorro	LINEAR	·	1.7 km	MPC · JPL

back to top

== See also ==
- Meanings of minor-planet names: 217001–218000
