= Tang Aoqing =

Chinese chemist (1915–2008)

- 唐敖庆

President of Jilin University
- In office July 1978 – January 1986
- Preceded by: Yang Guofeng
- Succeeded by: Wu Zhuoqun

Personal details
- Born: 18 November 1915 Yixing County, Jiangsu, China
- Died: 15 July 2008 (aged 92) Beijing, China
- Party: Chinese Communist Party
- Education: Peking University; National Southwestern Associated University; Columbia University
- Scientific career
- Fields: Theoretical chemistry
- Workplaces: Jilin University

Chinese name
- Simplified Chinese: 唐敖庆
- Traditional Chinese: 唐敖慶
Transcriptions
Standard Mandarin
- Hanyu Pinyin: Táng áoqìng
- Wade–Giles: T'ang Ao-ch'ing

Tang Aoqing (Chinese: 唐敖庆; Wade–Giles: T'ang Ao-ch'ing; 18 November 1915 – 15 July 2008), or Au-Chin Tang, was a Chinese theoretical chemist and educator, known as the "Father of Quantum Chemistry" in China. He established the Department of Chemistry of Jilin University, and served as President of the university from 1978 to 1986. He was a founding member of the Chinese Academy of Sciences and a member of the International Academy of Quantum Molecular Science (IAQMS). He established the National Natural Science Foundation of China in 1986 and served as its first president.

== Life and career ==
Tang was born on 18 November 1915 in Yixing, Jiangsu, Republic of China. He entered the Department of Chemistry of Peking University in the summer of 1936. When the Second Sino-Japanese War broke out in 1937, Beijing came under Japanese attack and Peking University, together with Tsinghua and Nankai universities, evacuated to Kunming in Southwest China. In Kunming, the universities combined their diminished resources to form the temporary National Southwestern Associated University, where Tang continued his studies. After graduating in 1940, he was hired by the university as a faculty member.

After the end of World War II, Tang was sent to the United States in 1946 to study nuclear physics, together with Tsung-Dao Lee, who would win the Nobel Prize in 1957, and other distinguished scientists. However, Sino-American relations deteriorated after the Chinese Civil War broke out, and Tang studied chemistry at Columbia University instead of nuclear physics.

After earning his Ph.D. from Columbia in 1949, Tang returned to the newly established People's Republic of China in early 1950 and became a professor of Peking University. In 1952, he moved to Changchun to help establish Jilin University (initially called the Northeast People's University). He founded the university's Department of Chemistry, and served as Vice President of the university from 1956. After the Cultural Revolution, he served as President of Jilin University from 1978 to 1986, and as President Emeritus afterwards until his death. He was elected a founding member of the Chinese Academy of Sciences in 1955 and a member of the International Academy of Quantum Molecular Science (IAQMS) in 1981.

== Scientific contributions ==
Tang's research was mainly focused on quantum chemistry, polymer chemistry, and polymer physics. In the 1950s, he pioneered a method to calculate the "potential function of molecular internal rotation". He later made contributions to the ligand field theory and developed three graph theorems of molecular orbital. He co-authored eight monographs and was conferred four consecutive State Natural Science Awards (including two first-class awards), an unprecedented achievement.

Tang is widely considered the "Father of Quantum Chemistry" in China. Five of his students were elected academicians of the Chinese Academy of Sciences in 1991 and 1993, and many of his students became leaders of theoretical chemistry in major Chinese universities, including Peking, Nanjing, Xiamen, and Beijing Normal University.

In 1986, Tang established the National Natural Science Foundation of China and served as its first president.

== Death and legacy ==
Tang died on 15 July 2008 in Beijing, at the age of 92. In 2011, the Chinese Chemical Society established the Tang Au-Chin Youth Award on Theoretical Chemistry in his memory. Asteroid 218914 Tangauchin, discovered by astronomers with the PMO NEO Survey Program at Purple Mountain Observatory in 2007, was named in his memory. The official naming citation was published by the Minor Planet Center on 9 January 2020 (M.P.C. 120069).

He was a delegate to the 2nd and 3rd National People's Congress. He was a member of 6th National Committee of the Chinese People's Political Consultative Conference and a member of the 7th and 8th Standing Committee of the Chinese People's Political Consultative Conference. He was a deputy to the 10th, 11th and 12th National Congress of the Chinese Communist Party.

== Honors and awards ==
- 1955 Member of the Chinese Academy of Sciences (CAS)
- 1982 State Natural Science Award (First Class) for coordination field theory method
- 1987 State Natural Science Award (First Class) for molecular orbital graph theory and its application
- 1989 State Natural Science Award (Second Class) for statistical theory of polymer polycondensation, addition polymerization and crosslinking reaction
- 1994 Chen Jiageng Chemistry Award
- 1995 Science and Technology Achievement Award of the Ho Leung Ho Lee Foundation
- 2000 State Natural Science Award (Second Class) for structure, chemical bonds and structural rules of atomic clusters

Educational offices
Preceded by Yang Guofeng	President of Jilin University; 1978–1986	Succeeded by Wu Zhuoqun
