= Meanings of minor-planet names: 218001–219000 =

As minor planet discoveries are confirmed, they are given a permanent number by the IAU's Minor Planet Center (MPC), and the discoverers can then submit names for them, following the IAU's naming conventions. The list below concerns those minor planets in the specified number-range that have received names, and explains the meanings of those names.

Official naming citations of newly named small Solar System bodies are approved and published in a bulletin by IAU's Working Group for Small Bodies Nomenclature (WGSBN). Before May 2021, citations were published in MPC's Minor Planet Circulars for many decades. Recent citations can also be found on the JPL Small-Body Database (SBDB). Until his death in 2016, German astronomer Lutz D. Schmadel compiled these citations into the Dictionary of Minor Planet Names (DMP) and regularly updated the collection.

Based on Paul Herget's The Names of the Minor Planets, Schmadel also researched the unclear origin of numerous asteroids, most of which had been named prior to World War II. This article incorporates text from this source, which is in the public domain: SBDB New namings may only be added to this list below after official publication as the preannouncement of names is condemned. The WGSBN publishes a comprehensive guideline for the naming rules of non-cometary small Solar System bodies.

== 218001–218100 ==
Named minor planet	Provisional	This minor planet was named for...	Ref · Catalog
218069 Lisaturner	2002 FN_{19}	Lisa S. Turner (b. 1975) served as an Administrative Assistant for the New Horizons spacecraft flyby of the Kuiper Belt object Arrokoth. She later served as a Program Manager Assistant for the mission.	IAU · 218069
218087 Kaniansky	2002 GZ_{184}	Stanislav Kaniansky (b. 1968), a Slovak astronomer and passionate astrophotographer.	IAU · 218087
218097 Maoxianxin	2002 LO_{61}	Xianxin Mao (born 1980) of Suzhou, Jiangsu, was a classmate of T. Chen, who located this object in images from NEAT, at Suzhou Pingjiang Experimental Primary School.	JPL · 218097

== 218101–218200 ==
back to top

Named minor planet	Provisional	This minor planet was named for...	Ref · Catalog
There are no named minor planets in this number range

== 218201–218300 ==
back to top

Named minor planet	Provisional	This minor planet was named for...	Ref · Catalog
218268 Pierremariepelé	2003 DF	Pierre-Marie Pelé (b. 1970), a French meteorite hunter.	IAU · 218268
218274 Albertferenc	2003 FL_{7}	Ferenc Albert (1811–1883), a Hungarian astronomer.	IAU · 218274

== 218301–218400 ==
back to top

Named minor planet	Provisional	This minor planet was named for...	Ref · Catalog
218400 Marquardt	2004 QG_{7}	Daniel Marquardt (born 1983), a writer and educator.	JPL · 218400

== 218401–218500 ==
back to top

Named minor planet	Provisional	This minor planet was named for...	Ref · Catalog
There are no named minor planets in this number range

== 218501–218600 ==
back to top

Named minor planet	Provisional	This minor planet was named for...	Ref · Catalog
218570 Jonvandegriff	2005 GO_{204}	Jon D. Vandegriff (b. 1969), an American senior software engineer at the Johns Hopkins University Applied Physics Laboratory.	IAU · 218570

== 218601–218700 ==
back to top

Named minor planet	Provisional	This minor planet was named for...	Ref · Catalog
218636 Calabria	2005 SN_{4}	Calabria is a southern Italian region. The region is at the tip of the Italian peninsula and is predominantly hilly. Between the 8th and 4th centuries BCE, Calabria was a thriving Greek colony.	JPL · 218636
218679 Sagamorehill	2005 TQ_{13}	Sagamore Hill (also known as the "Summer White House", located in Cove Neck, New York) was the home of former US President Theodore Roosevelt. Now a National Historic Site, Sagamore Hill was the location of the first negotiations in 1905 to end the Russo-Japanese War.	JPL · 218679
218692 Leesnyder	2005 TW_{76}	LeRoy F. Snyder (born 1928) is an accomplished variable-star researcher, having published numerous papers in AAVSO and IAPPP journals. He was a cofounder of the IAPPP-Western Wing, now the Society for Astronomical Sciences, and has served as its president for many years.	JPL · 218692

== 218701–218800 ==
back to top

Named minor planet	Provisional	This minor planet was named for...	Ref · Catalog
218752 Tentlingen	2007 EO_{9}	The Swiss municipality of Tentlingen (French: Tinterin) in the canton of Fribourg, no far from the discovering Observatory Naef Épendes	JPL · 218752

== 218801–218900 ==
back to top

Named minor planet	Provisional	This minor planet was named for...	Ref · Catalog
218866 Alexantioch	2006 XL_{4}	Alexandros of Antioch was a Greek sculptor of the 1st century BCE, known today for the Venus de Milo (Aphrodite of Milos), which is on display at the Louvre Museum in Paris, France.	JPL · 218866
218900 Gabybuchholz	2007 EO_{9}	Gabriele Buchholz (née Schöpf, b. 1952), who provides medical care, from classical therapy to acupuncture, for the people of Nagold, in southern Germany.	JPL · 218900

== 218901–219000 ==
back to top

Named minor planet	Provisional	This minor planet was named for...	Ref · Catalog
218901 Gerdbuchholz	2007 EO_{9}	Gerhard Buchholz (born 1950) provides medical care, from classical therapy to acupuncture, for the people of Nagold, in southern Germany.	JPL · 218901
218914 Tangauchin	2007 KG_{9}	Tang Aoqing (1915–2008), was a Chinese theoretical chemist, widely known as "The Father of Quantum Chemistry in China". He was an academician of Chinese Academy of Sciences and a member of the International Academy of Quantum Molecular Science. (Alternative spellings of his name include Au-Chin Tang and Tang Au-chin.)	JPL · 218914
218987 Heidenhain	2008 HV_{2}	Johannes Heidenhain (1898–1980), a German entrepreneur and amateur astronomer.	JPL · 218987
218998 Navi	2008 JZ_{2}	Navi Kocher (born 2009), grandchild of Swiss discoverer Peter Kocher	JPL · 218998

back to top

Preceded by 217,001–218,000	Meanings of minor-planet names List of minor planets: 218,001–219,000	Succeeded by 219,001–220,000
