= List of minor planets: 218001–219000 =

The following is a partial list of minor planets, running from minor-planet number 218001 through 219000, inclusive. The primary data for this and other partial lists is based on JPL's "Small-Body Orbital Elements" and data available from the Minor Planet Center. Critical list information is also provided by the MPC, unless otherwise specified from Lowell Observatory. A detailed description of the table's columns and additional sources are given on the main page including a complete list of every page in this series, and a statistical break-up on the dynamical classification of minor planets.

Also see the summary list of all named bodies in numerical and alphabetical order, and the corresponding naming citations for the number range of this particular list. New namings may only be added to this list after official publication, as the preannouncement of names is condemned by the Working Group for Small Bodies Nomenclature of the International Astronomical Union.

Near-Earth obj.	MBA (inner)	MBA (outer)	Centaur
Mars-crosser	MBA (middle)	Jupiter trojan	Trans-Neptunian obj.
Unclassified

== 218001–218100 ==
Designation			Discovery			Properties		Ref
Permanent	Provisional	Named after	Date	Site	Discoverer(s)	Category	Diam.	Ref
218001	2001 XQ_{72}	—	December 11, 2001	Socorro	LINEAR	·	2.0 km	MPC · JPL
218002	2001 XK_{75}	—	December 11, 2001	Socorro	LINEAR	·	2.6 km	MPC · JPL
218003	2001 XL_{80}	—	December 11, 2001	Socorro	LINEAR	·	2.4 km	MPC · JPL
218004	2001 XO_{86}	—	December 11, 2001	Socorro	LINEAR	·	1.3 km	MPC · JPL
218005	2001 XN_{104}	—	December 15, 2001	Socorro	LINEAR	H	980 m	MPC · JPL
218006	2001 XU_{113}	—	December 11, 2001	Socorro	LINEAR	·	1.9 km	MPC · JPL
218007	2001 XZ_{127}	—	December 14, 2001	Socorro	LINEAR	·	1.4 km	MPC · JPL
218008	2001 XQ_{157}	—	December 14, 2001	Socorro	LINEAR	·	1.8 km	MPC · JPL
218009	2001 XU_{202}	—	December 11, 2001	Socorro	LINEAR	(5)	1.8 km	MPC · JPL
218010	2001 XF_{217}	—	December 14, 2001	Socorro	LINEAR	·	4.4 km	MPC · JPL
218011	2001 XS_{224}	—	December 15, 2001	Socorro	LINEAR	·	2.7 km	MPC · JPL
218012	2001 XD_{227}	—	December 15, 2001	Socorro	LINEAR	·	2.0 km	MPC · JPL
218013	2001 XL_{227}	—	December 15, 2001	Socorro	LINEAR	·	3.0 km	MPC · JPL
218014	2001 XO_{228}	—	December 15, 2001	Socorro	LINEAR	·	3.2 km	MPC · JPL
218015	2001 XR_{228}	—	December 15, 2001	Socorro	LINEAR	EUN	1.9 km	MPC · JPL
218016	2001 XV_{238}	—	December 15, 2001	Socorro	LINEAR	·	1.9 km	MPC · JPL
218017	2001 XV_{266}	—	December 9, 2001	Mauna Kea	D. J. Tholen	APO	450 m	MPC · JPL
218018	2001 YR_{7}	—	December 17, 2001	Socorro	LINEAR	MAR	1.9 km	MPC · JPL
218019	2001 YX_{14}	—	December 17, 2001	Socorro	LINEAR	H	850 m	MPC · JPL
218020	2001 YN_{32}	—	December 18, 2001	Socorro	LINEAR	·	2.3 km	MPC · JPL
218021	2001 YY_{32}	—	December 18, 2001	Socorro	LINEAR	PAD	2.7 km	MPC · JPL
218022	2001 YK_{42}	—	December 18, 2001	Socorro	LINEAR	·	1.8 km	MPC · JPL
218023	2001 YL_{45}	—	December 18, 2001	Socorro	LINEAR	·	3.2 km	MPC · JPL
218024	2001 YC_{56}	—	December 18, 2001	Socorro	LINEAR	·	3.2 km	MPC · JPL
218025	2001 YC_{59}	—	December 18, 2001	Socorro	LINEAR	MRX	1.5 km	MPC · JPL
218026	2001 YN_{89}	—	December 18, 2001	Socorro	LINEAR	JUN	2.1 km	MPC · JPL
218027	2001 YA_{108}	—	December 17, 2001	Socorro	LINEAR	JUN	1.8 km	MPC · JPL
218028	2001 YQ_{109}	—	December 18, 2001	Socorro	LINEAR	·	2.1 km	MPC · JPL
218029	2001 YJ_{137}	—	December 22, 2001	Socorro	LINEAR	·	3.7 km	MPC · JPL
218030	2001 YQ_{143}	—	December 17, 2001	Socorro	LINEAR	·	2.6 km	MPC · JPL
218031	2002 AL_{2}	—	January 5, 2002	Socorro	LINEAR	·	2.8 km	MPC · JPL
218032	2002 AU_{9}	—	January 11, 2002	Desert Eagle	W. K. Y. Yeung	·	2.7 km	MPC · JPL
218033	2002 AB_{15}	—	January 6, 2002	Socorro	LINEAR	·	2.8 km	MPC · JPL
218034	2002 AJ_{36}	—	January 9, 2002	Socorro	LINEAR	·	2.7 km	MPC · JPL
218035	2002 AA_{43}	—	January 9, 2002	Socorro	LINEAR	AGN	1.9 km	MPC · JPL
218036	2002 AP_{104}	—	January 9, 2002	Socorro	LINEAR	·	4.1 km	MPC · JPL
218037	2002 AU_{133}	—	January 9, 2002	Socorro	LINEAR	·	2.6 km	MPC · JPL
218038	2002 AE_{137}	—	January 9, 2002	Socorro	LINEAR	·	2.7 km	MPC · JPL
218039	2002 AS_{145}	—	January 13, 2002	Socorro	LINEAR	AGN	1.7 km	MPC · JPL
218040	2002 AY_{206}	—	January 13, 2002	Apache Point	SDSS	·	1.8 km	MPC · JPL
218041	2002 BC_{3}	—	January 18, 2002	Anderson Mesa	LONEOS	·	3.8 km	MPC · JPL
218042	2002 BB_{25}	—	January 23, 2002	Socorro	LINEAR	V	860 m	MPC · JPL
218043	2002 BX_{29}	—	January 21, 2002	Anderson Mesa	LONEOS	EUN	2.4 km	MPC · JPL
218044	2002 CO_{44}	—	February 11, 2002	Socorro	LINEAR	·	1.8 km	MPC · JPL
218045	2002 CM_{68}	—	February 7, 2002	Socorro	LINEAR	·	2.3 km	MPC · JPL
218046	2002 CP_{120}	—	February 7, 2002	Socorro	LINEAR	·	2.3 km	MPC · JPL
218047	2002 CS_{120}	—	February 7, 2002	Socorro	LINEAR	·	3.0 km	MPC · JPL
218048	2002 CH_{176}	—	February 10, 2002	Socorro	LINEAR	·	2.6 km	MPC · JPL
218049	2002 CO_{213}	—	February 10, 2002	Socorro	LINEAR	KOR	1.8 km	MPC · JPL
218050	2002 CM_{226}	—	February 3, 2002	Haleakala	NEAT	TIN	2.2 km	MPC · JPL
218051	2002 CZ_{303}	—	February 13, 2002	Socorro	LINEAR	·	7.4 km	MPC · JPL
218052	2002 CT_{311}	—	February 11, 2002	Socorro	LINEAR	·	2.7 km	MPC · JPL
218053	2002 DT_{1}	—	February 20, 2002	Kitt Peak	Spacewatch	·	1.4 km	MPC · JPL
218054	2002 DG_{15}	—	February 16, 2002	Palomar	NEAT	·	3.2 km	MPC · JPL
218055	2002 EF_{4}	—	March 10, 2002	Cima Ekar	ADAS	·	2.6 km	MPC · JPL
218056	2002 ET_{35}	—	March 9, 2002	Kitt Peak	Spacewatch	·	3.1 km	MPC · JPL
218057	2002 ET_{41}	—	March 12, 2002	Socorro	LINEAR	·	5.2 km	MPC · JPL
218058	2002 EA_{45}	—	March 10, 2002	Haleakala	NEAT	·	4.0 km	MPC · JPL
218059	2002 EW_{46}	—	March 11, 2002	Palomar	NEAT	·	5.2 km	MPC · JPL
218060	2002 EJ_{54}	—	March 13, 2002	Socorro	LINEAR	·	4.8 km	MPC · JPL
218061	2002 EG_{65}	—	March 13, 2002	Socorro	LINEAR	KOR	2.1 km	MPC · JPL
218062	2002 EQ_{70}	—	March 13, 2002	Socorro	LINEAR	·	3.1 km	MPC · JPL
218063	2002 EB_{101}	—	March 6, 2002	Socorro	LINEAR	EUP	6.8 km	MPC · JPL
218064	2002 EL_{105}	—	March 9, 2002	Kitt Peak	Spacewatch	·	5.8 km	MPC · JPL
218065	2002 EO_{106}	—	March 9, 2002	Anderson Mesa	LONEOS	·	970 m	MPC · JPL
218066	2002 EF_{135}	—	March 13, 2002	Palomar	NEAT	EOS	2.8 km	MPC · JPL
218067	2002 EC_{148}	—	March 15, 2002	Palomar	NEAT	KOR	2.0 km	MPC · JPL
218068	2002 FX_{1}	—	March 18, 2002	Ondřejov	L. Kotková	·	2.9 km	MPC · JPL
218069 Lisaturner	2002 FN_{19}	Lisaturner	March 18, 2002	Kitt Peak	M. W. Buie	KOR	1.7 km	MPC · JPL
218070	2002 FL_{37}	—	March 31, 2002	Palomar	NEAT	L4	20 km	MPC · JPL
218071	2002 GO_{44}	—	April 4, 2002	Haleakala	NEAT	·	3.5 km	MPC · JPL
218072	2002 GO_{58}	—	April 8, 2002	Palomar	NEAT	EOS	3.1 km	MPC · JPL
218073	2002 GQ_{65}	—	April 8, 2002	Palomar	NEAT	·	4.5 km	MPC · JPL
218074	2002 GR_{70}	—	April 8, 2002	Palomar	NEAT	·	8.6 km	MPC · JPL
218075	2002 GY_{70}	—	April 8, 2002	Bergisch Gladbach	W. Bickel	HYG	4.9 km	MPC · JPL
218076	2002 GK_{77}	—	April 9, 2002	Anderson Mesa	LONEOS	·	3.6 km	MPC · JPL
218077	2002 GY_{88}	—	April 10, 2002	Socorro	LINEAR	·	5.2 km	MPC · JPL
218078	2002 GT_{89}	—	April 8, 2002	Palomar	NEAT	·	870 m	MPC · JPL
218079	2002 GQ_{91}	—	April 9, 2002	Anderson Mesa	LONEOS	·	4.7 km	MPC · JPL
218080	2002 GY_{101}	—	April 10, 2002	Socorro	LINEAR	EOS	2.9 km	MPC · JPL
218081	2002 GS_{117}	—	April 11, 2002	Socorro	LINEAR	·	4.5 km	MPC · JPL
218082	2002 GU_{118}	—	April 12, 2002	Palomar	NEAT	·	1.1 km	MPC · JPL
218083	2002 GQ_{134}	—	April 12, 2002	Socorro	LINEAR	·	5.9 km	MPC · JPL
218084	2002 GO_{136}	—	April 12, 2002	Socorro	LINEAR	·	3.9 km	MPC · JPL
218085	2002 GJ_{143}	—	April 13, 2002	Palomar	NEAT	·	6.1 km	MPC · JPL
218086	2002 GM_{148}	—	April 14, 2002	Socorro	LINEAR	HYG	4.5 km	MPC · JPL
218087 Kaniansky	2002 GZ_{184}	Kaniansky	April 8, 2002	Palomar	NEAT	·	4.5 km	MPC · JPL
218088	2002 HT_{6}	—	April 18, 2002	Palomar	NEAT	·	5.0 km	MPC · JPL
218089	2002 HY_{13}	—	April 21, 2002	Socorro	LINEAR	EUP · fast	5.7 km	MPC · JPL
218090	2002 JS_{7}	—	May 4, 2002	Palomar	NEAT	·	5.2 km	MPC · JPL
218091	2002 JR_{10}	—	May 7, 2002	Socorro	LINEAR	·	1.0 km	MPC · JPL
218092	2002 JQ_{19}	—	May 7, 2002	Palomar	NEAT	·	5.1 km	MPC · JPL
218093	2002 JV_{38}	—	May 9, 2002	Palomar	NEAT	·	1.0 km	MPC · JPL
218094	2002 JD_{79}	—	May 11, 2002	Socorro	LINEAR	·	870 m	MPC · JPL
218095	2002 JC_{123}	—	May 6, 2002	Palomar	NEAT	·	4.6 km	MPC · JPL
218096	2002 KB_{14}	—	May 30, 2002	Palomar	NEAT	·	1.0 km	MPC · JPL
218097 Maoxianxin	2002 LO_{61}	Maoxianxin	June 1, 2002	Palomar	NEAT	·	4.8 km	MPC · JPL
218098	2002 MG	—	June 17, 2002	Socorro	LINEAR	·	2.0 km	MPC · JPL
218099	2002 MH_{3}	—	June 26, 2002	Palomar	NEAT	·	1.7 km	MPC · JPL
218100	2002 NY_{3}	—	July 6, 2002	Needville	P. G. A. Garossino, J. Dellinger	·	860 m	MPC · JPL

== 218101–218200 ==
back to top

Designation			Discovery			Properties		Ref
Permanent	Provisional	Named after	Date	Site	Discoverer(s)	Category	Diam.	Ref
218101	2002 NH_{27}	—	July 9, 2002	Socorro	LINEAR	·	1.1 km	MPC · JPL
218102	2002 NL_{35}	—	July 9, 2002	Socorro	LINEAR	·	1.0 km	MPC · JPL
218103	2002 NJ_{49}	—	July 14, 2002	Socorro	LINEAR	·	1.4 km	MPC · JPL
218104	2002 NO_{55}	—	July 9, 2002	Socorro	LINEAR	·	1.2 km	MPC · JPL
218105	2002 NN_{62}	—	July 4, 2002	Palomar	NEAT	·	840 m	MPC · JPL
218106	2002 OO_{15}	—	July 18, 2002	Socorro	LINEAR	·	1.5 km	MPC · JPL
218107	2002 OM_{16}	—	July 18, 2002	Socorro	LINEAR	·	1.0 km	MPC · JPL
218108	2002 OC_{22}	—	July 22, 2002	Palomar	NEAT	·	840 m	MPC · JPL
218109	2002 OU_{22}	—	July 31, 2002	Socorro	LINEAR	PHO	1.9 km	MPC · JPL
218110	2002 OP_{27}	—	July 21, 2002	Palomar	NEAT	V	860 m	MPC · JPL
218111	2002 PW_{16}	—	August 6, 2002	Palomar	NEAT	·	820 m	MPC · JPL
218112	2002 PQ_{21}	—	August 6, 2002	Palomar	NEAT	·	1.1 km	MPC · JPL
218113	2002 PS_{53}	—	August 8, 2002	Palomar	NEAT	·	1.4 km	MPC · JPL
218114	2002 PP_{59}	—	August 10, 2002	Socorro	LINEAR	·	2.0 km	MPC · JPL
218115	2002 PL_{60}	—	August 10, 2002	Socorro	LINEAR	·	1.1 km	MPC · JPL
218116	2002 PG_{68}	—	August 6, 2002	Palomar	NEAT	·	830 m	MPC · JPL
218117	2002 PT_{71}	—	August 12, 2002	Socorro	LINEAR	V	720 m	MPC · JPL
218118	2002 PP_{79}	—	August 11, 2002	Palomar	NEAT	·	1.1 km	MPC · JPL
218119	2002 PV_{105}	—	August 12, 2002	Socorro	LINEAR	·	1.0 km	MPC · JPL
218120	2002 PR_{110}	—	August 13, 2002	Socorro	LINEAR	·	1.0 km	MPC · JPL
218121	2002 PB_{112}	—	August 3, 2002	Campo Imperatore	CINEOS	PHO	3.3 km	MPC · JPL
218122	2002 PF_{113}	—	August 13, 2002	Palomar	NEAT	PHO	3.0 km	MPC · JPL
218123	2002 PR_{114}	—	August 13, 2002	Anderson Mesa	LONEOS	·	1.4 km	MPC · JPL
218124	2002 PS_{120}	—	August 13, 2002	Anderson Mesa	LONEOS	·	1.4 km	MPC · JPL
218125	2002 PZ_{125}	—	August 14, 2002	Socorro	LINEAR	·	1.2 km	MPC · JPL
218126	2002 PY_{132}	—	August 14, 2002	Socorro	LINEAR	·	910 m	MPC · JPL
218127	2002 PK_{139}	—	August 12, 2002	Socorro	LINEAR	PHO	1.4 km	MPC · JPL
218128	2002 PQ_{178}	—	August 11, 2002	Socorro	LINEAR	·	1.5 km	MPC · JPL
218129	2002 QU_{20}	—	August 28, 2002	Palomar	NEAT	·	1.1 km	MPC · JPL
218130	2002 QQ_{27}	—	August 28, 2002	Palomar	NEAT	·	860 m	MPC · JPL
218131	2002 QT_{45}	—	August 31, 2002	Kitt Peak	Spacewatch	·	1.1 km	MPC · JPL
218132	2002 QU_{45}	—	August 31, 2002	Kitt Peak	Spacewatch	·	1.4 km	MPC · JPL
218133	2002 QG_{89}	—	August 27, 2002	Palomar	NEAT	·	710 m	MPC · JPL
218134	2002 QU_{121}	—	August 16, 2002	Palomar	NEAT	·	3.5 km	MPC · JPL
218135	2002 QC_{126}	—	August 16, 2002	Palomar	NEAT	·	960 m	MPC · JPL
218136	2002 QA_{133}	—	August 18, 2002	Palomar	NEAT	·	900 m	MPC · JPL
218137	2002 RB_{21}	—	September 4, 2002	Anderson Mesa	LONEOS	·	880 m	MPC · JPL
218138	2002 RT_{29}	—	September 3, 2002	Haleakala	NEAT	·	1.7 km	MPC · JPL
218139	2002 RV_{29}	—	September 4, 2002	Anderson Mesa	LONEOS	(2076)	890 m	MPC · JPL
218140	2002 RP_{33}	—	September 4, 2002	Anderson Mesa	LONEOS	·	5.6 km	MPC · JPL
218141	2002 RV_{44}	—	September 5, 2002	Socorro	LINEAR	·	1.2 km	MPC · JPL
218142	2002 RY_{47}	—	September 5, 2002	Socorro	LINEAR	·	4.7 km	MPC · JPL
218143	2002 RC_{60}	—	September 5, 2002	Anderson Mesa	LONEOS	·	1.6 km	MPC · JPL
218144	2002 RL_{66}	—	September 6, 2002	Socorro	LINEAR	moon · slow	2.6 km	MPC · JPL
218145	2002 RZ_{71}	—	September 5, 2002	Socorro	LINEAR	·	3.7 km	MPC · JPL
218146	2002 RD_{72}	—	September 5, 2002	Socorro	LINEAR	V	1.1 km	MPC · JPL
218147	2002 RU_{75}	—	September 5, 2002	Socorro	LINEAR	·	1.4 km	MPC · JPL
218148	2002 RT_{85}	—	September 5, 2002	Socorro	LINEAR	NYS	1.2 km	MPC · JPL
218149	2002 RA_{98}	—	September 5, 2002	Socorro	LINEAR	·	1.8 km	MPC · JPL
218150	2002 RC_{106}	—	September 5, 2002	Socorro	LINEAR	·	2.4 km	MPC · JPL
218151	2002 RF_{111}	—	September 6, 2002	Socorro	LINEAR	·	1.8 km	MPC · JPL
218152	2002 RU_{116}	—	September 7, 2002	Socorro	LINEAR	·	2.0 km	MPC · JPL
218153	2002 RS_{123}	—	September 9, 2002	Campo Imperatore	CINEOS	·	2.2 km	MPC · JPL
218154	2002 RK_{133}	—	September 9, 2002	Haleakala	NEAT	·	1.8 km	MPC · JPL
218155	2002 RT_{141}	—	September 10, 2002	Haleakala	NEAT	·	1.2 km	MPC · JPL
218156	2002 RB_{148}	—	September 11, 2002	Palomar	NEAT	NYS	1.0 km	MPC · JPL
218157	2002 RS_{150}	—	September 11, 2002	Haleakala	NEAT	V	860 m	MPC · JPL
218158	2002 RL_{164}	—	September 12, 2002	Palomar	NEAT	·	1.2 km	MPC · JPL
218159	2002 RK_{171}	—	September 13, 2002	Socorro	LINEAR	·	1.3 km	MPC · JPL
218160	2002 RX_{175}	—	September 13, 2002	Palomar	NEAT	·	1.1 km	MPC · JPL
218161	2002 RX_{179}	—	September 14, 2002	Kitt Peak	Spacewatch	·	1.0 km	MPC · JPL
218162	2002 RO_{213}	—	September 13, 2002	Anderson Mesa	LONEOS	·	1.6 km	MPC · JPL
218163	2002 RH_{225}	—	September 13, 2002	Palomar	NEAT	V	750 m	MPC · JPL
218164	2002 RA_{229}	—	September 14, 2002	Haleakala	NEAT	·	1.3 km	MPC · JPL
218165	2002 RG_{245}	—	September 15, 2002	Palomar	NEAT	·	1.3 km	MPC · JPL
218166	2002 RG_{264}	—	September 13, 2002	Palomar	NEAT	·	980 m	MPC · JPL
218167	2002 SN_{5}	—	September 27, 2002	Palomar	NEAT	·	1.1 km	MPC · JPL
218168	2002 SF_{7}	—	September 27, 2002	Palomar	NEAT	·	1.2 km	MPC · JPL
218169	2002 SM_{16}	—	September 27, 2002	Palomar	NEAT	·	2.9 km	MPC · JPL
218170	2002 SN_{23}	—	September 27, 2002	Palomar	NEAT	·	4.5 km	MPC · JPL
218171	2002 ST_{38}	—	September 30, 2002	Socorro	LINEAR	·	1.6 km	MPC · JPL
218172	2002 SN_{43}	—	September 28, 2002	Haleakala	NEAT	NYS	1.6 km	MPC · JPL
218173	2002 SL_{45}	—	September 29, 2002	Haleakala	NEAT	V	1.1 km	MPC · JPL
218174	2002 SO_{67}	—	September 16, 2002	Palomar	NEAT	V	830 m	MPC · JPL
218175	2002 SU_{71}	—	September 28, 2002	Haleakala	NEAT	·	1.5 km	MPC · JPL
218176	2002 TN_{2}	—	October 1, 2002	Anderson Mesa	LONEOS	NYS	1.3 km	MPC · JPL
218177	2002 TV_{6}	—	October 1, 2002	Anderson Mesa	LONEOS	·	1.9 km	MPC · JPL
218178	2002 TJ_{14}	—	October 1, 2002	Anderson Mesa	LONEOS	MAS	830 m	MPC · JPL
218179	2002 TK_{24}	—	October 2, 2002	Socorro	LINEAR	V	1.2 km	MPC · JPL
218180	2002 TM_{29}	—	October 2, 2002	Socorro	LINEAR	NYS	1.5 km	MPC · JPL
218181	2002 TX_{29}	—	October 2, 2002	Socorro	LINEAR	NYS	1.6 km	MPC · JPL
218182	2002 TG_{35}	—	October 2, 2002	Socorro	LINEAR	·	1.5 km	MPC · JPL
218183	2002 TQ_{40}	—	October 2, 2002	Socorro	LINEAR	·	1.5 km	MPC · JPL
218184	2002 TA_{41}	—	October 2, 2002	Socorro	LINEAR	·	2.0 km	MPC · JPL
218185	2002 TF_{47}	—	October 2, 2002	Socorro	LINEAR	·	1.8 km	MPC · JPL
218186	2002 TQ_{52}	—	October 2, 2002	Socorro	LINEAR	·	2.0 km	MPC · JPL
218187	2002 TD_{63}	—	October 3, 2002	Campo Imperatore	CINEOS	·	1.7 km	MPC · JPL
218188	2002 TG_{67}	—	October 7, 2002	Socorro	LINEAR	PHO	1.8 km	MPC · JPL
218189	2002 TC_{68}	—	October 7, 2002	Socorro	LINEAR	PHO	1.5 km	MPC · JPL
218190	2002 TR_{78}	—	October 1, 2002	Socorro	LINEAR	·	1.6 km	MPC · JPL
218191	2002 TW_{84}	—	October 2, 2002	Haleakala	NEAT	V	920 m	MPC · JPL
218192	2002 TA_{88}	—	October 3, 2002	Socorro	LINEAR	·	3.6 km	MPC · JPL
218193	2002 TQ_{91}	—	October 3, 2002	Palomar	NEAT	·	1.7 km	MPC · JPL
218194	2002 TT_{91}	—	October 3, 2002	Palomar	NEAT	V	1.1 km	MPC · JPL
218195	2002 TD_{99}	—	October 3, 2002	Campo Imperatore	CINEOS	·	1.7 km	MPC · JPL
218196	2002 TH_{102}	—	October 4, 2002	Socorro	LINEAR	·	1.3 km	MPC · JPL
218197	2002 TH_{111}	—	October 2, 2002	Campo Imperatore	CINEOS	·	1.9 km	MPC · JPL
218198	2002 TZ_{130}	—	October 4, 2002	Socorro	LINEAR	·	1.4 km	MPC · JPL
218199	2002 TW_{134}	—	October 4, 2002	Palomar	NEAT	·	1.9 km	MPC · JPL
218200	2002 TO_{146}	—	October 4, 2002	Socorro	LINEAR	·	1.6 km	MPC · JPL

== 218201–218300 ==
back to top

Designation			Discovery			Properties		Ref
Permanent	Provisional	Named after	Date	Site	Discoverer(s)	Category	Diam.	Ref
218201	2002 TM_{183}	—	October 4, 2002	Socorro	LINEAR	·	2.4 km	MPC · JPL
218202	2002 TU_{184}	—	October 4, 2002	Socorro	LINEAR	·	1.7 km	MPC · JPL
218203	2002 TS_{186}	—	October 4, 2002	Socorro	LINEAR	·	1.7 km	MPC · JPL
218204	2002 TN_{213}	—	October 3, 2002	Socorro	LINEAR	EOS	2.9 km	MPC · JPL
218205	2002 TR_{215}	—	October 5, 2002	Socorro	LINEAR	·	1.2 km	MPC · JPL
218206	2002 TP_{217}	—	October 8, 2002	Anderson Mesa	LONEOS	NYS	1.4 km	MPC · JPL
218207	2002 TA_{219}	—	October 5, 2002	Socorro	LINEAR	·	1.5 km	MPC · JPL
218208	2002 TD_{253}	—	October 8, 2002	Anderson Mesa	LONEOS	MAS	960 m	MPC · JPL
218209	2002 TL_{257}	—	October 9, 2002	Socorro	LINEAR	NYS	1.4 km	MPC · JPL
218210	2002 TR_{266}	—	October 10, 2002	Socorro	LINEAR	·	2.8 km	MPC · JPL
218211	2002 TH_{278}	—	October 10, 2002	Socorro	LINEAR	·	1.5 km	MPC · JPL
218212	2002 TK_{278}	—	October 10, 2002	Socorro	LINEAR	·	2.1 km	MPC · JPL
218213	2002 TC_{286}	—	October 10, 2002	Socorro	LINEAR	·	1.5 km	MPC · JPL
218214	2002 TY_{298}	—	October 12, 2002	Socorro	LINEAR	·	2.1 km	MPC · JPL
218215	2002 TZ_{332}	—	October 5, 2002	Apache Point	SDSS	·	1.6 km	MPC · JPL
218216	2002 UJ_{31}	—	October 30, 2002	Haleakala	NEAT	·	1.3 km	MPC · JPL
218217	2002 UB_{39}	—	October 31, 2002	Palomar	NEAT	MAS	800 m	MPC · JPL
218218	2002 VG_{7}	—	November 4, 2002	Palomar	NEAT	·	1.6 km	MPC · JPL
218219	2002 VO_{11}	—	November 1, 2002	Palomar	NEAT	·	1.5 km	MPC · JPL
218220	2002 VS_{16}	—	November 5, 2002	Socorro	LINEAR	·	1.6 km	MPC · JPL
218221	2002 VZ_{29}	—	November 5, 2002	Socorro	LINEAR	·	1.8 km	MPC · JPL
218222	2002 VF_{32}	—	November 5, 2002	Socorro	LINEAR	·	1.8 km	MPC · JPL
218223	2002 VB_{34}	—	November 5, 2002	Socorro	LINEAR	NYS	1.7 km	MPC · JPL
218224	2002 VY_{64}	—	November 7, 2002	Socorro	LINEAR	V	1.1 km	MPC · JPL
218225	2002 VT_{65}	—	November 7, 2002	Anderson Mesa	LONEOS	PHO	2.7 km	MPC · JPL
218226	2002 VN_{67}	—	November 7, 2002	Socorro	LINEAR	NYS	1.8 km	MPC · JPL
218227	2002 VD_{76}	—	November 7, 2002	Socorro	LINEAR	·	1.9 km	MPC · JPL
218228	2002 VU_{77}	—	November 7, 2002	Socorro	LINEAR	·	1.5 km	MPC · JPL
218229	2002 VM_{78}	—	November 7, 2002	Socorro	LINEAR	·	2.2 km	MPC · JPL
218230	2002 VS_{79}	—	November 7, 2002	Socorro	LINEAR	·	2.7 km	MPC · JPL
218231	2002 VM_{89}	—	November 11, 2002	Socorro	LINEAR	PHO	1.9 km	MPC · JPL
218232	2002 VB_{93}	—	November 11, 2002	Socorro	LINEAR	·	2.1 km	MPC · JPL
218233	2002 VR_{112}	—	November 13, 2002	Palomar	NEAT	CLA	2.3 km	MPC · JPL
218234	2002 VY_{113}	—	November 13, 2002	Palomar	NEAT	MAS	1.0 km	MPC · JPL
218235	2002 VP_{128}	—	November 14, 2002	Socorro	LINEAR	·	1.9 km	MPC · JPL
218236	2002 WV_{4}	—	November 21, 2002	Palomar	NEAT	V	940 m	MPC · JPL
218237	2002 WG_{25}	—	November 22, 2002	Palomar	NEAT	·	1.5 km	MPC · JPL
218238	2002 WT_{26}	—	November 22, 2002	Palomar	NEAT	MAS	820 m	MPC · JPL
218239	2002 XA_{4}	—	December 1, 2002	Haleakala	NEAT	MAS	910 m	MPC · JPL
218240	2002 XN_{25}	—	December 5, 2002	Socorro	LINEAR	·	2.1 km	MPC · JPL
218241	2002 XF_{45}	—	December 9, 2002	Kitt Peak	Spacewatch	3:2 · SHU	7.5 km	MPC · JPL
218242	2002 XD_{59}	—	December 11, 2002	Socorro	LINEAR	·	2.4 km	MPC · JPL
218243	2002 XM_{72}	—	December 11, 2002	Socorro	LINEAR	MAS	1.3 km	MPC · JPL
218244	2002 XJ_{75}	—	December 11, 2002	Socorro	LINEAR	·	1.8 km	MPC · JPL
218245	2002 XN_{79}	—	December 11, 2002	Socorro	LINEAR	NYS	2.0 km	MPC · JPL
218246	2002 XU_{81}	—	December 11, 2002	Socorro	LINEAR	·	1.6 km	MPC · JPL
218247	2002 XU_{96}	—	December 5, 2002	Socorro	LINEAR	MAS	1.0 km	MPC · JPL
218248	2002 XF_{110}	—	December 6, 2002	Socorro	LINEAR	·	3.3 km	MPC · JPL
218249	2002 XL_{111}	—	December 6, 2002	Socorro	LINEAR	·	2.0 km	MPC · JPL
218250	2002 XV_{119}	—	December 10, 2002	Palomar	NEAT	·	1.8 km	MPC · JPL
218251	2003 AE_{1}	—	January 2, 2003	Socorro	LINEAR	·	2.3 km	MPC · JPL
218252	2003 AW_{5}	—	January 1, 2003	Socorro	LINEAR	·	3.0 km	MPC · JPL
218253	2003 AD_{26}	—	January 4, 2003	Socorro	LINEAR	·	1.9 km	MPC · JPL
218254	2003 AN_{26}	—	January 4, 2003	Socorro	LINEAR	·	1.8 km	MPC · JPL
218255	2003 AP_{36}	—	January 7, 2003	Socorro	LINEAR	·	3.3 km	MPC · JPL
218256	2003 AR_{38}	—	January 7, 2003	Socorro	LINEAR	·	1.7 km	MPC · JPL
218257	2003 AZ_{38}	—	January 7, 2003	Socorro	LINEAR	EUN	2.0 km	MPC · JPL
218258	2003 AE_{55}	—	January 5, 2003	Socorro	LINEAR	·	2.7 km	MPC · JPL
218259	2003 AJ_{61}	—	January 7, 2003	Socorro	LINEAR	PHO	1.5 km	MPC · JPL
218260	2003 AU_{81}	—	January 11, 2003	Socorro	LINEAR	H	1.1 km	MPC · JPL
218261	2003 BB_{6}	—	January 23, 2003	Kvistaberg	Uppsala-DLR Asteroid Survey	·	3.4 km	MPC · JPL
218262	2003 BT_{11}	—	January 26, 2003	Anderson Mesa	LONEOS	·	1.5 km	MPC · JPL
218263	2003 BO_{29}	—	January 27, 2003	Socorro	LINEAR	·	2.3 km	MPC · JPL
218264	2003 BO_{35}	—	January 28, 2003	Socorro	LINEAR	·	3.3 km	MPC · JPL
218265	2003 BB_{76}	—	January 29, 2003	Palomar	NEAT	·	2.8 km	MPC · JPL
218266	2003 CQ_{6}	—	February 1, 2003	Socorro	LINEAR	·	1.1 km	MPC · JPL
218267	2003 CX_{17}	—	February 7, 2003	Palomar	NEAT	·	3.2 km	MPC · JPL
218268 Pierremariepelé	2003 DF	Pierremariepelé	February 20, 2003	Vicques	M. Ory	·	1.7 km	MPC · JPL
218269	2003 DT	—	February 21, 2003	Palomar	NEAT	·	2.2 km	MPC · JPL
218270	2003 EK	—	March 3, 2003	Haleakala	NEAT	H	870 m	MPC · JPL
218271	2003 ED_{4}	—	March 6, 2003	Socorro	LINEAR	·	2.7 km	MPC · JPL
218272	2003 EH_{23}	—	March 6, 2003	Socorro	LINEAR	·	3.3 km	MPC · JPL
218273	2003 EW_{61}	—	March 9, 2003	Socorro	LINEAR	·	3.7 km	MPC · JPL
218274 Albertferenc	2003 FL_{7}	Albertferenc	March 29, 2003	Piszkéstető	K. Sárneczky	PAD	2.2 km	MPC · JPL
218275	2003 FW_{23}	—	March 23, 2003	Kitt Peak	Spacewatch	·	1.8 km	MPC · JPL
218276	2003 FC_{24}	—	March 23, 2003	Kitt Peak	Spacewatch	·	2.5 km	MPC · JPL
218277	2003 FK_{27}	—	March 24, 2003	Kitt Peak	Spacewatch	·	2.3 km	MPC · JPL
218278	2003 FV_{59}	—	March 26, 2003	Palomar	NEAT	BRA	2.2 km	MPC · JPL
218279	2003 FV_{60}	—	March 26, 2003	Palomar	NEAT	·	3.2 km	MPC · JPL
218280	2003 FR_{62}	—	March 26, 2003	Kitt Peak	Spacewatch	GEF	1.9 km	MPC · JPL
218281	2003 FX_{62}	—	March 26, 2003	Palomar	NEAT	·	1.3 km	MPC · JPL
218282	2003 FE_{65}	—	March 26, 2003	Palomar	NEAT	·	2.9 km	MPC · JPL
218283	2003 FZ_{90}	—	March 29, 2003	Anderson Mesa	LONEOS	·	3.3 km	MPC · JPL
218284	2003 GS_{37}	—	April 7, 2003	Palomar	NEAT	WIT	1.7 km	MPC · JPL
218285	2003 HF_{42}	—	April 27, 2003	Socorro	LINEAR	EUP	7.3 km	MPC · JPL
218286	2003 JP_{8}	—	May 2, 2003	Socorro	LINEAR	·	5.9 km	MPC · JPL
218287	2003 MK_{1}	—	June 23, 2003	Socorro	LINEAR	·	4.3 km	MPC · JPL
218288	2003 MD_{5}	—	June 26, 2003	Socorro	LINEAR	T_{j} (2.99)	7.7 km	MPC · JPL
218289	2003 OV_{4}	—	July 22, 2003	Haleakala	NEAT	·	5.8 km	MPC · JPL
218290	2003 OJ_{6}	—	July 22, 2003	Campo Imperatore	CINEOS	·	5.5 km	MPC · JPL
218291	2003 OA_{12}	—	July 22, 2003	Palomar	NEAT	ELF	5.6 km	MPC · JPL
218292	2003 OQ_{28}	—	July 24, 2003	Palomar	NEAT	·	5.8 km	MPC · JPL
218293	2003 PP_{11}	—	August 8, 2003	Kvistaberg	Uppsala-DLR Asteroid Survey	·	6.0 km	MPC · JPL
218294	2003 QD_{12}	—	August 22, 2003	Socorro	LINEAR	·	5.8 km	MPC · JPL
218295	2003 QG_{12}	—	August 22, 2003	Palomar	NEAT	T_{j} (2.99)	7.1 km	MPC · JPL
218296	2003 QN_{54}	—	August 23, 2003	Socorro	LINEAR	·	9.7 km	MPC · JPL
218297	2003 QP_{60}	—	August 23, 2003	Socorro	LINEAR	·	5.8 km	MPC · JPL
218298	2003 QQ_{65}	—	August 25, 2003	Palomar	NEAT	·	6.3 km	MPC · JPL
218299	2003 RK_{12}	—	September 13, 2003	Haleakala	NEAT	URS	5.8 km	MPC · JPL
218300	2003 SD_{123}	—	September 18, 2003	Socorro	LINEAR	TIR	3.5 km	MPC · JPL

== 218301–218400 ==
back to top

Designation			Discovery			Properties		Ref
Permanent	Provisional	Named after	Date	Site	Discoverer(s)	Category	Diam.	Ref
218301	2003 SG_{198}	—	September 21, 2003	Anderson Mesa	LONEOS	SYL · CYB	7.5 km	MPC · JPL
218302	2003 SW_{238}	—	September 27, 2003	Socorro	LINEAR	·	1.3 km	MPC · JPL
218303	2003 SC_{258}	—	September 28, 2003	Kitt Peak	Spacewatch	·	1.6 km	MPC · JPL
218304	2003 SV_{293}	—	September 28, 2003	Socorro	LINEAR	·	6.9 km	MPC · JPL
218305	2003 SU_{306}	—	September 30, 2003	Socorro	LINEAR	·	4.0 km	MPC · JPL
218306	2003 SW_{407}	—	September 27, 2003	Apache Point	SDSS	HNS	2.0 km	MPC · JPL
218307	2003 UZ_{9}	—	October 20, 2003	Kitt Peak	Spacewatch	·	1.5 km	MPC · JPL
218308	2003 UR_{35}	—	October 16, 2003	Anderson Mesa	LONEOS	·	5.1 km	MPC · JPL
218309	2003 UJ_{53}	—	October 18, 2003	Palomar	NEAT	·	990 m	MPC · JPL
218310	2003 UG_{262}	—	October 26, 2003	Kitt Peak	Spacewatch	·	1.0 km	MPC · JPL
218311	2003 UN_{274}	—	October 30, 2003	Socorro	LINEAR	·	2.3 km	MPC · JPL
218312	2003 WH_{16}	—	November 16, 2003	Kitt Peak	Spacewatch	·	870 m	MPC · JPL
218313	2003 WL_{131}	—	November 21, 2003	Palomar	NEAT	(5)	1.8 km	MPC · JPL
218314	2003 XE_{14}	—	December 13, 2003	Socorro	LINEAR	PHO	1.6 km	MPC · JPL
218315	2003 YM_{13}	—	December 17, 2003	Anderson Mesa	LONEOS	·	1.2 km	MPC · JPL
218316	2003 YT_{18}	—	December 17, 2003	Kitt Peak	Spacewatch	·	840 m	MPC · JPL
218317	2003 YO_{21}	—	December 17, 2003	Kitt Peak	Spacewatch	·	1.4 km	MPC · JPL
218318	2003 YJ_{26}	—	December 18, 2003	Socorro	LINEAR	·	1.1 km	MPC · JPL
218319	2003 YK_{31}	—	December 18, 2003	Socorro	LINEAR	·	790 m	MPC · JPL
218320	2003 YL_{37}	—	December 17, 2003	Kitt Peak	Spacewatch	·	1.2 km	MPC · JPL
218321	2003 YD_{55}	—	December 19, 2003	Socorro	LINEAR	·	980 m	MPC · JPL
218322	2003 YC_{65}	—	December 19, 2003	Socorro	LINEAR	·	1.2 km	MPC · JPL
218323	2003 YM_{117}	—	December 27, 2003	Socorro	LINEAR	·	1.2 km	MPC · JPL
218324	2003 YT_{130}	—	December 28, 2003	Socorro	LINEAR	·	1.3 km	MPC · JPL
218325	2003 YN_{143}	—	December 28, 2003	Socorro	LINEAR	·	1.2 km	MPC · JPL
218326	2003 YL_{144}	—	December 28, 2003	Kitt Peak	Spacewatch	·	1.3 km	MPC · JPL
218327	2004 BF_{3}	—	January 16, 2004	Palomar	NEAT	·	1.2 km	MPC · JPL
218328	2004 BS_{7}	—	January 16, 2004	Kitt Peak	Spacewatch	·	1.8 km	MPC · JPL
218329	2004 BJ_{10}	—	January 16, 2004	Nogales	Tenagra II	·	2.1 km	MPC · JPL
218330	2004 BL_{36}	—	January 19, 2004	Kitt Peak	Spacewatch	·	1.6 km	MPC · JPL
218331	2004 BJ_{42}	—	January 21, 2004	Socorro	LINEAR	·	1.9 km	MPC · JPL
218332	2004 BK_{49}	—	January 21, 2004	Socorro	LINEAR	·	1.2 km	MPC · JPL
218333	2004 BX_{70}	—	January 22, 2004	Socorro	LINEAR	·	1.2 km	MPC · JPL
218334	2004 BM_{73}	—	January 24, 2004	Socorro	LINEAR	GEF	1.9 km	MPC · JPL
218335	2004 BW_{77}	—	January 22, 2004	Socorro	LINEAR	NYS	1.9 km	MPC · JPL
218336	2004 BS_{84}	—	January 27, 2004	Anderson Mesa	LONEOS	·	4.0 km	MPC · JPL
218337	2004 BX_{87}	—	January 23, 2004	Socorro	LINEAR	·	1.4 km	MPC · JPL
218338	2004 BO_{99}	—	January 27, 2004	Kitt Peak	Spacewatch	·	1.1 km	MPC · JPL
218339	2004 BF_{121}	—	January 30, 2004	Modra	A. Galád, L. Kornoš	·	1.0 km	MPC · JPL
218340	2004 BU_{129}	—	January 16, 2004	Kitt Peak	Spacewatch	·	1.3 km	MPC · JPL
218341	2004 CQ_{3}	—	February 10, 2004	Palomar	NEAT	·	1.5 km	MPC · JPL
218342	2004 CA_{12}	—	February 11, 2004	Palomar	NEAT	PHO	1.0 km	MPC · JPL
218343	2004 DR_{8}	—	February 17, 2004	Kitt Peak	Spacewatch	·	1.9 km	MPC · JPL
218344	2004 DE_{14}	—	February 16, 2004	Socorro	LINEAR	·	2.8 km	MPC · JPL
218345	2004 EO_{10}	—	March 15, 2004	Catalina	CSS	·	1.5 km	MPC · JPL
218346	2004 FN_{4}	—	March 18, 2004	Needville	J. Dellinger, D. Wells	·	1.7 km	MPC · JPL
218347	2004 FD_{8}	—	March 16, 2004	Palomar	NEAT	JUN	1.5 km	MPC · JPL
218348	2004 FY_{17}	—	March 27, 2004	Junk Bond	D. Healy	·	2.4 km	MPC · JPL
218349	2004 FW_{50}	—	March 18, 2004	Kitt Peak	Spacewatch	·	2.5 km	MPC · JPL
218350	2004 FK_{94}	—	March 23, 2004	Socorro	LINEAR	·	2.2 km	MPC · JPL
218351	2004 FC_{107}	—	March 20, 2004	Socorro	LINEAR	·	1.8 km	MPC · JPL
218352	2004 FB_{110}	—	March 24, 2004	Anderson Mesa	LONEOS	·	2.3 km	MPC · JPL
218353	2004 FZ_{110}	—	March 25, 2004	Anderson Mesa	LONEOS	·	2.0 km	MPC · JPL
218354	2004 FQ_{123}	—	March 26, 2004	Socorro	LINEAR	·	3.0 km	MPC · JPL
218355	2004 FD_{134}	—	March 26, 2004	Anderson Mesa	LONEOS	·	1.5 km	MPC · JPL
218356	2004 FP_{142}	—	March 27, 2004	Socorro	LINEAR	EUN	2.0 km	MPC · JPL
218357	2004 GH	—	April 8, 2004	Siding Spring	SSS	·	2.1 km	MPC · JPL
218358	2004 GB_{10}	—	April 12, 2004	Palomar	NEAT	·	2.0 km	MPC · JPL
218359	2004 GC_{15}	—	April 12, 2004	Reedy Creek	J. Broughton	·	2.4 km	MPC · JPL
218360	2004 GS_{33}	—	April 12, 2004	Kitt Peak	Spacewatch	·	2.0 km	MPC · JPL
218361	2004 GZ_{37}	—	April 14, 2004	Palomar	NEAT	·	6.4 km	MPC · JPL
218362	2004 GX_{77}	—	April 15, 2004	Palomar	NEAT	(194)	2.9 km	MPC · JPL
218363	2004 GW_{87}	—	April 15, 2004	Palomar	NEAT	EUN	1.9 km	MPC · JPL
218364	2004 HR_{38}	—	April 23, 2004	Haleakala	NEAT	MAR	1.6 km	MPC · JPL
218365	2004 HB_{50}	—	April 23, 2004	Socorro	LINEAR	·	3.4 km	MPC · JPL
218366	2004 HU_{62}	—	April 30, 2004	Kitt Peak	Spacewatch	·	1.5 km	MPC · JPL
218367	2004 JE_{1}	—	May 9, 2004	Haleakala	NEAT	·	2.4 km	MPC · JPL
218368	2004 JS_{1}	—	May 10, 2004	Reedy Creek	J. Broughton	·	2.6 km	MPC · JPL
218369	2004 JS_{6}	—	May 10, 2004	Palomar	NEAT	·	3.3 km	MPC · JPL
218370	2004 JG_{11}	—	May 12, 2004	Catalina	CSS	·	2.4 km	MPC · JPL
218371	2004 JN_{22}	—	May 9, 2004	Kitt Peak	Spacewatch	·	1.8 km	MPC · JPL
218372	2004 JZ_{25}	—	May 15, 2004	Socorro	LINEAR	ADE	3.7 km	MPC · JPL
218373	2004 JC_{29}	—	May 15, 2004	Socorro	LINEAR	·	2.7 km	MPC · JPL
218374	2004 JT_{31}	—	May 11, 2004	Catalina	CSS	·	2.8 km	MPC · JPL
218375	2004 JC_{34}	—	May 15, 2004	Socorro	LINEAR	·	2.8 km	MPC · JPL
218376	2004 JA_{45}	—	May 15, 2004	Bergisch Gladbach	W. Bickel	·	2.6 km	MPC · JPL
218377	2004 KB_{15}	—	May 22, 2004	Goodricke-Pigott	Goodricke-Pigott	JUN	1.9 km	MPC · JPL
218378	2004 LS_{18}	—	June 11, 2004	Kitt Peak	Spacewatch	·	2.3 km	MPC · JPL
218379	2004 LJ_{26}	—	June 12, 2004	Kitt Peak	Spacewatch	EUN	2.1 km	MPC · JPL
218380	2004 NF_{11}	—	July 11, 2004	Socorro	LINEAR	·	1.8 km	MPC · JPL
218381	2004 NT_{13}	—	July 11, 2004	Socorro	LINEAR	·	2.9 km	MPC · JPL
218382	2004 NO_{16}	—	July 11, 2004	Socorro	LINEAR	EOS	3.3 km	MPC · JPL
218383	2004 ND_{24}	—	July 14, 2004	Socorro	LINEAR	·	5.6 km	MPC · JPL
218384	2004 OL_{8}	—	July 16, 2004	Socorro	LINEAR	·	3.5 km	MPC · JPL
218385	2004 OQ_{8}	—	July 16, 2004	Socorro	LINEAR	·	6.5 km	MPC · JPL
218386	2004 PC	—	August 4, 2004	Needville	J. Dellinger, W. G. Dillon	·	2.8 km	MPC · JPL
218387	2004 PH_{13}	—	August 7, 2004	Palomar	NEAT	·	2.9 km	MPC · JPL
218388	2004 PD_{16}	—	August 7, 2004	Palomar	NEAT	EOS	2.9 km	MPC · JPL
218389	2004 PH_{21}	—	August 7, 2004	Palomar	NEAT	·	6.2 km	MPC · JPL
218390	2004 PH_{40}	—	August 9, 2004	Socorro	LINEAR	·	4.6 km	MPC · JPL
218391	2004 PE_{46}	—	August 7, 2004	Siding Spring	SSS	·	4.0 km	MPC · JPL
218392	2004 PB_{53}	—	August 8, 2004	Socorro	LINEAR	EOS	4.0 km	MPC · JPL
218393	2004 PQ_{60}	—	August 9, 2004	Socorro	LINEAR	EOS	2.6 km	MPC · JPL
218394	2004 PE_{64}	—	August 10, 2004	Socorro	LINEAR	·	4.6 km	MPC · JPL
218395	2004 PB_{81}	—	August 10, 2004	Socorro	LINEAR	·	2.9 km	MPC · JPL
218396	2004 PH_{95}	—	August 12, 2004	Socorro	LINEAR	·	5.9 km	MPC · JPL
218397	2004 PT_{99}	—	August 11, 2004	Socorro	LINEAR	EOS	3.2 km	MPC · JPL
218398	2004 QY	—	August 16, 2004	Palomar	NEAT	EOS	3.9 km	MPC · JPL
218399	2004 QF_{5}	—	August 21, 2004	Reedy Creek	J. Broughton	·	5.3 km	MPC · JPL
218400 Marquardt	2004 QG_{7}	Marquardt	August 22, 2004	Altschwendt	W. Ries	·	3.5 km	MPC · JPL

== 218401–218500 ==
back to top

Designation			Discovery			Properties		Ref
Permanent	Provisional	Named after	Date	Site	Discoverer(s)	Category	Diam.	Ref
218401	2004 QH_{7}	—	August 22, 2004	Altschwendt	Altschwendt	EOS	2.3 km	MPC · JPL
218402	2004 QU_{13}	—	August 20, 2004	Socorro	LINEAR	H	790 m	MPC · JPL
218403	2004 QA_{18}	—	August 19, 2004	Socorro	LINEAR	TIR	5.0 km	MPC · JPL
218404	2004 RC_{6}	—	September 4, 2004	Palomar	NEAT	·	4.8 km	MPC · JPL
218405	2004 RE_{11}	—	September 6, 2004	Siding Spring	SSS	KOR	2.0 km	MPC · JPL
218406	2004 RO_{18}	—	September 7, 2004	Kitt Peak	Spacewatch	·	2.0 km	MPC · JPL
218407	2004 RN_{46}	—	September 8, 2004	Socorro	LINEAR	·	2.5 km	MPC · JPL
218408	2004 RO_{48}	—	September 8, 2004	Socorro	LINEAR	·	3.6 km	MPC · JPL
218409	2004 RS_{59}	—	September 8, 2004	Socorro	LINEAR	TEL	2.4 km	MPC · JPL
218410	2004 RJ_{67}	—	September 8, 2004	Socorro	LINEAR	·	5.5 km	MPC · JPL
218411	2004 RZ_{72}	—	September 8, 2004	Socorro	LINEAR	EOS	3.1 km	MPC · JPL
218412	2004 RO_{81}	—	September 8, 2004	Socorro	LINEAR	·	2.2 km	MPC · JPL
218413	2004 RU_{87}	—	September 7, 2004	Palomar	NEAT	·	5.5 km	MPC · JPL
218414	2004 RD_{94}	—	September 8, 2004	Socorro	LINEAR	EOS	6.1 km	MPC · JPL
218415	2004 RC_{97}	—	September 8, 2004	Palomar	NEAT	EOS	3.3 km	MPC · JPL
218416	2004 RE_{97}	—	September 8, 2004	Palomar	NEAT	·	4.5 km	MPC · JPL
218417	2004 RR_{106}	—	September 8, 2004	Palomar	NEAT	·	4.8 km	MPC · JPL
218418	2004 RZ_{113}	—	September 7, 2004	Palomar	NEAT	·	5.2 km	MPC · JPL
218419	2004 RD_{121}	—	September 7, 2004	Kitt Peak	Spacewatch	·	1.7 km	MPC · JPL
218420	2004 RO_{137}	—	September 8, 2004	Socorro	LINEAR	·	3.2 km	MPC · JPL
218421	2004 RF_{143}	—	September 8, 2004	Palomar	NEAT	·	4.3 km	MPC · JPL
218422	2004 RW_{148}	—	September 9, 2004	Socorro	LINEAR	KOR	2.2 km	MPC · JPL
218423	2004 RZ_{153}	—	September 10, 2004	Socorro	LINEAR	·	3.9 km	MPC · JPL
218424	2004 RM_{157}	—	September 10, 2004	Socorro	LINEAR	EOS	3.1 km	MPC · JPL
218425	2004 RV_{159}	—	September 10, 2004	Socorro	LINEAR	·	3.4 km	MPC · JPL
218426	2004 RN_{164}	—	September 10, 2004	Goodricke-Pigott	R. A. Tucker	THB	3.8 km	MPC · JPL
218427	2004 RU_{170}	—	September 8, 2004	Palomar	NEAT	·	3.6 km	MPC · JPL
218428	2004 RB_{175}	—	September 10, 2004	Socorro	LINEAR	·	3.6 km	MPC · JPL
218429	2004 RG_{175}	—	September 10, 2004	Socorro	LINEAR	·	3.1 km	MPC · JPL
218430	2004 RJ_{178}	—	September 10, 2004	Socorro	LINEAR	·	3.9 km	MPC · JPL
218431	2004 RY_{178}	—	September 10, 2004	Socorro	LINEAR	EOS	3.4 km	MPC · JPL
218432	2004 RK_{179}	—	September 10, 2004	Socorro	LINEAR	·	3.1 km	MPC · JPL
218433	2004 RM_{181}	—	September 10, 2004	Socorro	LINEAR	EOS	3.2 km	MPC · JPL
218434	2004 RP_{182}	—	September 10, 2004	Socorro	LINEAR	·	5.0 km	MPC · JPL
218435	2004 RM_{183}	—	September 10, 2004	Socorro	LINEAR	·	5.2 km	MPC · JPL
218436	2004 RG_{184}	—	September 10, 2004	Socorro	LINEAR	·	3.3 km	MPC · JPL
218437	2004 RD_{191}	—	September 10, 2004	Socorro	LINEAR	EOS	3.1 km	MPC · JPL
218438	2004 RE_{191}	—	September 10, 2004	Socorro	LINEAR	·	5.0 km	MPC · JPL
218439	2004 RM_{191}	—	September 10, 2004	Socorro	LINEAR	·	6.9 km	MPC · JPL
218440	2004 RK_{192}	—	September 10, 2004	Socorro	LINEAR	·	5.1 km	MPC · JPL
218441	2004 RW_{196}	—	September 10, 2004	Socorro	LINEAR	·	3.6 km	MPC · JPL
218442	2004 RN_{197}	—	September 10, 2004	Socorro	LINEAR	EOS	3.6 km	MPC · JPL
218443	2004 RD_{200}	—	September 10, 2004	Socorro	LINEAR	·	1.5 km	MPC · JPL
218444	2004 RT_{200}	—	September 10, 2004	Socorro	LINEAR	·	5.1 km	MPC · JPL
218445	2004 RS_{212}	—	September 11, 2004	Socorro	LINEAR	·	5.7 km	MPC · JPL
218446	2004 RH_{215}	—	September 11, 2004	Socorro	LINEAR	·	4.9 km	MPC · JPL
218447	2004 RZ_{216}	—	September 11, 2004	Socorro	LINEAR	·	5.3 km	MPC · JPL
218448	2004 RN_{217}	—	September 11, 2004	Socorro	LINEAR	·	4.6 km	MPC · JPL
218449	2004 RZ_{218}	—	September 11, 2004	Socorro	LINEAR	·	5.2 km	MPC · JPL
218450	2004 RW_{220}	—	September 11, 2004	Socorro	LINEAR	TIR	5.1 km	MPC · JPL
218451	2004 RZ_{220}	—	September 11, 2004	Socorro	LINEAR	H · slow	960 m	MPC · JPL
218452	2004 RH_{221}	—	September 11, 2004	Socorro	LINEAR	·	6.2 km	MPC · JPL
218453	2004 RT_{227}	—	September 9, 2004	Kitt Peak	Spacewatch	·	4.2 km	MPC · JPL
218454	2004 RZ_{228}	—	September 9, 2004	Kitt Peak	Spacewatch	·	3.7 km	MPC · JPL
218455	2004 RX_{230}	—	September 9, 2004	Kitt Peak	Spacewatch	EOS	2.5 km	MPC · JPL
218456	2004 RH_{246}	—	September 10, 2004	Kitt Peak	Spacewatch	VER	4.5 km	MPC · JPL
218457	2004 RQ_{250}	—	September 13, 2004	Socorro	LINEAR	·	5.3 km	MPC · JPL
218458	2004 RK_{251}	—	September 14, 2004	Palomar	NEAT	·	3.5 km	MPC · JPL
218459	2004 RZ_{272}	—	September 11, 2004	Kitt Peak	Spacewatch	KOR	1.6 km	MPC · JPL
218460	2004 RV_{289}	—	September 13, 2004	Palomar	NEAT	EOS	2.6 km	MPC · JPL
218461	2004 RC_{310}	—	September 13, 2004	Socorro	LINEAR	H	960 m	MPC · JPL
218462	2004 RO_{310}	—	September 13, 2004	Palomar	NEAT	EOS	3.6 km	MPC · JPL
218463	2004 RS_{310}	—	September 13, 2004	Palomar	NEAT	·	2.5 km	MPC · JPL
218464	2004 RF_{319}	—	September 13, 2004	Socorro	LINEAR	·	2.8 km	MPC · JPL
218465	2004 RO_{323}	—	September 13, 2004	Socorro	LINEAR	·	4.4 km	MPC · JPL
218466	2004 RX_{325}	—	September 13, 2004	Socorro	LINEAR	·	5.0 km	MPC · JPL
218467	2004 RL_{328}	—	September 15, 2004	Anderson Mesa	LONEOS	·	3.7 km	MPC · JPL
218468	2004 RR_{329}	—	September 15, 2004	Kitt Peak	Spacewatch	·	4.2 km	MPC · JPL
218469	2004 RP_{333}	—	September 15, 2004	Anderson Mesa	LONEOS	EOS	2.2 km	MPC · JPL
218470	2004 RK_{342}	—	September 10, 2004	Socorro	LINEAR	·	2.4 km	MPC · JPL
218471	2004 SG_{17}	—	September 17, 2004	Anderson Mesa	LONEOS	EOS	3.0 km	MPC · JPL
218472	2004 SC_{30}	—	September 17, 2004	Socorro	LINEAR	·	4.1 km	MPC · JPL
218473	2004 SJ_{34}	—	September 17, 2004	Kitt Peak	Spacewatch	·	2.8 km	MPC · JPL
218474	2004 SZ_{42}	—	September 18, 2004	Socorro	LINEAR	·	3.6 km	MPC · JPL
218475	2004 SK_{44}	—	September 18, 2004	Socorro	LINEAR	·	3.7 km	MPC · JPL
218476	2004 SS_{45}	—	September 18, 2004	Socorro	LINEAR	·	4.9 km	MPC · JPL
218477	2004 SP_{47}	—	September 18, 2004	Socorro	LINEAR	EOS	3.3 km	MPC · JPL
218478	2004 ST_{49}	—	September 21, 2004	Socorro	LINEAR	H	970 m	MPC · JPL
218479	2004 SE_{53}	—	September 22, 2004	Socorro	LINEAR	EOS	3.2 km	MPC · JPL
218480	2004 SC_{58}	—	September 16, 2004	Anderson Mesa	LONEOS	·	4.5 km	MPC · JPL
218481	2004 SJ_{58}	—	September 16, 2004	Anderson Mesa	LONEOS	THM	3.2 km	MPC · JPL
218482	2004 TY_{7}	—	October 4, 2004	Goodricke-Pigott	R. A. Tucker	·	3.8 km	MPC · JPL
218483	2004 TY_{11}	—	October 5, 2004	Goodricke-Pigott	R. A. Tucker	·	2.5 km	MPC · JPL
218484	2004 TG_{12}	—	October 7, 2004	Goodricke-Pigott	R. A. Tucker	EOS	2.7 km	MPC · JPL
218485	2004 TN_{13}	—	October 9, 2004	Socorro	LINEAR	H	840 m	MPC · JPL
218486	2004 TH_{17}	—	October 9, 2004	Anderson Mesa	LONEOS	·	5.6 km	MPC · JPL
218487	2004 TX_{25}	—	October 4, 2004	Kitt Peak	Spacewatch	·	2.6 km	MPC · JPL
218488	2004 TK_{39}	—	October 4, 2004	Socorro	LINEAR	·	5.5 km	MPC · JPL
218489	2004 TK_{45}	—	October 4, 2004	Kitt Peak	Spacewatch	VER	4.7 km	MPC · JPL
218490	2004 TW_{48}	—	October 4, 2004	Kitt Peak	Spacewatch	·	5.0 km	MPC · JPL
218491	2004 TP_{50}	—	October 4, 2004	Kitt Peak	Spacewatch	·	4.4 km	MPC · JPL
218492	2004 TG_{54}	—	October 4, 2004	Kitt Peak	Spacewatch	THM	3.0 km	MPC · JPL
218493	2004 TZ_{55}	—	October 4, 2004	Kitt Peak	Spacewatch	·	3.9 km	MPC · JPL
218494	2004 TJ_{56}	—	October 5, 2004	Kitt Peak	Spacewatch	·	2.6 km	MPC · JPL
218495	2004 TZ_{59}	—	October 5, 2004	Kitt Peak	Spacewatch	·	2.8 km	MPC · JPL
218496	2004 TT_{61}	—	October 5, 2004	Anderson Mesa	LONEOS	·	4.4 km	MPC · JPL
218497	2004 TD_{66}	—	October 5, 2004	Anderson Mesa	LONEOS	·	3.7 km	MPC · JPL
218498	2004 TB_{75}	—	October 6, 2004	Kitt Peak	Spacewatch	·	3.2 km	MPC · JPL
218499	2004 TO_{75}	—	October 6, 2004	Kitt Peak	Spacewatch	·	2.9 km	MPC · JPL
218500	2004 TT_{77}	—	October 13, 2004	Socorro	LINEAR	·	5.3 km	MPC · JPL

== 218501–218600 ==
back to top

Designation			Discovery			Properties		Ref
Permanent	Provisional	Named after	Date	Site	Discoverer(s)	Category	Diam.	Ref
218501	2004 TX_{83}	—	October 5, 2004	Kitt Peak	Spacewatch	·	3.8 km	MPC · JPL
218502	2004 TQ_{84}	—	October 5, 2004	Kitt Peak	Spacewatch	·	2.6 km	MPC · JPL
218503	2004 TG_{85}	—	October 5, 2004	Kitt Peak	Spacewatch	·	3.4 km	MPC · JPL
218504	2004 TW_{98}	—	October 5, 2004	Kitt Peak	Spacewatch	·	2.3 km	MPC · JPL
218505	2004 TD_{99}	—	October 5, 2004	Palomar	NEAT	·	5.3 km	MPC · JPL
218506	2004 TZ_{103}	—	October 7, 2004	Kitt Peak	Spacewatch	EOS	3.0 km	MPC · JPL
218507	2004 TO_{104}	—	October 7, 2004	Anderson Mesa	LONEOS	·	4.9 km	MPC · JPL
218508	2004 TL_{106}	—	October 7, 2004	Socorro	LINEAR	·	3.9 km	MPC · JPL
218509	2004 TU_{106}	—	October 7, 2004	Socorro	LINEAR	·	3.3 km	MPC · JPL
218510	2004 TY_{108}	—	October 7, 2004	Socorro	LINEAR	·	2.9 km	MPC · JPL
218511	2004 TS_{109}	—	October 7, 2004	Socorro	LINEAR	·	4.1 km	MPC · JPL
218512	2004 TL_{112}	—	October 7, 2004	Palomar	NEAT	·	4.9 km	MPC · JPL
218513	2004 TT_{123}	—	October 7, 2004	Anderson Mesa	LONEOS	·	3.1 km	MPC · JPL
218514	2004 TP_{131}	—	October 7, 2004	Anderson Mesa	LONEOS	·	4.7 km	MPC · JPL
218515	2004 TG_{136}	—	October 8, 2004	Anderson Mesa	LONEOS	EOS	3.4 km	MPC · JPL
218516	2004 TN_{168}	—	October 7, 2004	Socorro	LINEAR	·	4.3 km	MPC · JPL
218517	2004 TT_{195}	—	October 7, 2004	Kitt Peak	Spacewatch	·	3.9 km	MPC · JPL
218518	2004 TT_{209}	—	October 8, 2004	Kitt Peak	Spacewatch	·	2.7 km	MPC · JPL
218519	2004 TT_{237}	—	October 9, 2004	Kitt Peak	Spacewatch	·	4.1 km	MPC · JPL
218520	2004 TF_{243}	—	October 6, 2004	Socorro	LINEAR	TIR	4.4 km	MPC · JPL
218521	2004 TA_{255}	—	October 9, 2004	Kitt Peak	Spacewatch	·	2.8 km	MPC · JPL
218522	2004 TN_{265}	—	October 9, 2004	Kitt Peak	Spacewatch	·	4.0 km	MPC · JPL
218523	2004 TH_{274}	—	October 9, 2004	Kitt Peak	Spacewatch	·	4.7 km	MPC · JPL
218524	2004 TT_{274}	—	October 9, 2004	Kitt Peak	Spacewatch	HYG	4.2 km	MPC · JPL
218525	2004 TE_{301}	—	October 8, 2004	Socorro	LINEAR	·	5.6 km	MPC · JPL
218526	2004 TM_{306}	—	October 10, 2004	Socorro	LINEAR	·	5.1 km	MPC · JPL
218527	2004 TO_{307}	—	October 10, 2004	Socorro	LINEAR	·	5.0 km	MPC · JPL
218528	2004 TS_{339}	—	October 13, 2004	Kitt Peak	Spacewatch	·	2.5 km	MPC · JPL
218529	2004 TN_{351}	—	October 10, 2004	Kitt Peak	Spacewatch	·	3.4 km	MPC · JPL
218530	2004 TQ_{355}	—	October 7, 2004	Socorro	LINEAR	AEG	4.3 km	MPC · JPL
218531	2004 TA_{358}	—	October 9, 2004	Socorro	LINEAR	T_{j} (2.99)	6.3 km	MPC · JPL
218532	2004 TM_{358}	—	October 4, 2004	Anderson Mesa	LONEOS	EOS	3.3 km	MPC · JPL
218533	2004 UZ_{6}	—	October 21, 2004	Socorro	LINEAR	·	3.6 km	MPC · JPL
218534	2004 VW_{4}	—	November 3, 2004	Anderson Mesa	LONEOS	·	3.1 km	MPC · JPL
218535	2004 VF_{12}	—	November 3, 2004	Palomar	NEAT	·	4.1 km	MPC · JPL
218536	2004 VB_{16}	—	November 5, 2004	Palomar	NEAT	·	4.1 km	MPC · JPL
218537	2004 VO_{18}	—	November 4, 2004	Kitt Peak	Spacewatch	CYB	8.2 km	MPC · JPL
218538	2004 VV_{26}	—	November 4, 2004	Catalina	CSS	·	7.0 km	MPC · JPL
218539	2004 VP_{57}	—	November 5, 2004	Palomar	NEAT	·	5.5 km	MPC · JPL
218540	2004 VW_{60}	—	November 11, 2004	Catalina	CSS	·	4.2 km	MPC · JPL
218541	2004 VW_{74}	—	November 11, 2004	Kitt Peak	Spacewatch	H	1.0 km	MPC · JPL
218542	2004 WQ_{8}	—	November 18, 2004	Socorro	LINEAR	H	990 m	MPC · JPL
218543	2004 XF	—	December 1, 2004	Socorro	LINEAR	H	1.0 km	MPC · JPL
218544	2004 XS_{5}	—	December 4, 2004	Socorro	LINEAR	·	5.4 km	MPC · JPL
218545	2004 XG_{8}	—	December 2, 2004	Socorro	LINEAR	·	4.3 km	MPC · JPL
218546	2004 XW_{44}	—	December 13, 2004	Socorro	LINEAR	H	1.0 km	MPC · JPL
218547	2004 XO_{102}	—	December 13, 2004	Anderson Mesa	LONEOS	H	1.0 km	MPC · JPL
218548	2004 YV_{5}	—	December 21, 2004	Catalina	CSS	·	4.6 km	MPC · JPL
218549	2005 AZ_{32}	—	January 12, 2005	Socorro	LINEAR	H	1.1 km	MPC · JPL
218550	2005 BQ_{26}	—	January 19, 2005	Socorro	LINEAR	H	990 m	MPC · JPL
218551	2005 CA_{40}	—	February 4, 2005	Kitt Peak	Spacewatch	·	940 m	MPC · JPL
218552	2005 EM_{28}	—	March 3, 2005	Catalina	CSS	·	1.8 km	MPC · JPL
218553	2005 EK_{41}	—	March 1, 2005	Catalina	CSS	·	5.4 km	MPC · JPL
218554	2005 EV_{84}	—	March 4, 2005	Catalina	CSS	PHO	3.1 km	MPC · JPL
218555	2005 EW_{133}	—	March 9, 2005	Socorro	LINEAR	·	970 m	MPC · JPL
218556	2005 EE_{147}	—	March 10, 2005	Mount Lemmon	Mount Lemmon Survey	·	1.1 km	MPC · JPL
218557	2005 ET_{150}	—	March 10, 2005	Kitt Peak	Spacewatch	·	980 m	MPC · JPL
218558	2005 EM_{198}	—	March 11, 2005	Mount Lemmon	Mount Lemmon Survey	·	1.2 km	MPC · JPL
218559	2005 EW_{220}	—	March 11, 2005	Mount Lemmon	Mount Lemmon Survey	·	800 m	MPC · JPL
218560	2005 EN_{227}	—	March 9, 2005	Mount Lemmon	Mount Lemmon Survey	·	910 m	MPC · JPL
218561	2005 EZ_{239}	—	March 11, 2005	Kitt Peak	Spacewatch	·	840 m	MPC · JPL
218562	2005 EC_{266}	—	March 13, 2005	Kitt Peak	Spacewatch	·	1.3 km	MPC · JPL
218563	2005 GV_{29}	—	April 4, 2005	Catalina	CSS	·	1.1 km	MPC · JPL
218564	2005 GP_{69}	—	April 3, 2005	Palomar	NEAT	(1338) (FLO)	940 m	MPC · JPL
218565	2005 GO_{113}	—	April 9, 2005	Mount Lemmon	Mount Lemmon Survey	·	820 m	MPC · JPL
218566	2005 GR_{113}	—	April 9, 2005	Socorro	LINEAR	·	1.2 km	MPC · JPL
218567	2005 GV_{113}	—	April 9, 2005	Socorro	LINEAR	·	1.7 km	MPC · JPL
218568	2005 GQ_{123}	—	April 8, 2005	Socorro	LINEAR	·	1.3 km	MPC · JPL
218569	2005 GR_{180}	—	April 12, 2005	Kitt Peak	Spacewatch	·	2.2 km	MPC · JPL
218570 Jonvandegriff	2005 GO_{204}	Jonvandegriff	April 10, 2005	Kitt Peak	M. W. Buie	·	1.1 km	MPC · JPL
218571	2005 JN_{34}	—	May 4, 2005	Kitt Peak	Spacewatch	·	2.5 km	MPC · JPL
218572	2005 JX_{36}	—	May 4, 2005	Kitt Peak	Spacewatch	PHO	1.8 km	MPC · JPL
218573	2005 JW_{46}	—	May 3, 2005	Kitt Peak	Spacewatch	·	1.2 km	MPC · JPL
218574	2005 JX_{48}	—	May 3, 2005	Socorro	LINEAR	HYG	3.9 km	MPC · JPL
218575	2005 JY_{51}	—	May 4, 2005	Kitt Peak	Spacewatch	·	1.2 km	MPC · JPL
218576	2005 JN_{58}	—	May 7, 2005	Kitt Peak	Spacewatch	·	2.1 km	MPC · JPL
218577	2005 JH_{82}	—	May 6, 2005	Mount Lemmon	Mount Lemmon Survey	·	870 m	MPC · JPL
218578	2005 JT_{86}	—	May 8, 2005	Siding Spring	SSS	·	1.5 km	MPC · JPL
218579	2005 JJ_{112}	—	May 9, 2005	Catalina	CSS	·	1.9 km	MPC · JPL
218580	2005 JD_{121}	—	May 10, 2005	Kitt Peak	Spacewatch	·	920 m	MPC · JPL
218581	2005 JA_{127}	—	May 12, 2005	Catalina	CSS	·	1.9 km	MPC · JPL
218582	2005 JR_{181}	—	May 1, 2005	Palomar	NEAT	·	930 m	MPC · JPL
218583	2005 KD	—	May 16, 2005	Reedy Creek	J. Broughton	·	1.5 km	MPC · JPL
218584	2005 KB_{5}	—	May 18, 2005	Palomar	NEAT	·	970 m	MPC · JPL
218585	2005 KE_{10}	—	May 28, 2005	Reedy Creek	J. Broughton	·	1.8 km	MPC · JPL
218586	2005 KM_{10}	—	May 29, 2005	Siding Spring	SSS	MAS	900 m	MPC · JPL
218587	2005 LV_{26}	—	June 8, 2005	Kitt Peak	Spacewatch	·	1.6 km	MPC · JPL
218588	2005 LF_{30}	—	June 12, 2005	Kitt Peak	Spacewatch	MAS	1.0 km	MPC · JPL
218589	2005 LO_{30}	—	June 12, 2005	Kitt Peak	Spacewatch	NYS	1.6 km	MPC · JPL
218590	2005 LJ_{40}	—	June 14, 2005	Kitt Peak	Spacewatch	NYS	1.7 km	MPC · JPL
218591	2005 LL_{42}	—	June 13, 2005	Campo Imperatore	CINEOS	NYS	1.7 km	MPC · JPL
218592	2005 MF_{37}	—	June 30, 2005	Kitt Peak	Spacewatch	·	1.8 km	MPC · JPL
218593	2005 MG_{39}	—	June 28, 2005	Palomar	NEAT	·	2.2 km	MPC · JPL
218594	2005 MH_{40}	—	June 30, 2005	Kitt Peak	Spacewatch	·	1.7 km	MPC · JPL
218595	2005 MR_{40}	—	June 30, 2005	Kitt Peak	Spacewatch	·	1.7 km	MPC · JPL
218596	2005 MY_{50}	—	June 30, 2005	Catalina	CSS	RAF	1.6 km	MPC · JPL
218597	2005 MY_{52}	—	June 21, 2005	Palomar	NEAT	·	1.8 km	MPC · JPL
218598	2005 NQ_{2}	—	July 2, 2005	Kitt Peak	Spacewatch	NYS	1.6 km	MPC · JPL
218599	2005 NG_{10}	—	July 3, 2005	Mount Lemmon	Mount Lemmon Survey	MAS	920 m	MPC · JPL
218600	2005 NS_{53}	—	July 10, 2005	Kitt Peak	Spacewatch	·	1.6 km	MPC · JPL

== 218601–218700 ==
back to top

Designation			Discovery			Properties		Ref
Permanent	Provisional	Named after	Date	Site	Discoverer(s)	Category	Diam.	Ref
218601	2005 NR_{55}	—	July 11, 2005	Mayhill	Lowe, A.	(194)	2.5 km	MPC · JPL
218602	2005 NE_{69}	—	July 4, 2005	Kitt Peak	Spacewatch	fast?	1.7 km	MPC · JPL
218603	2005 NN_{72}	—	July 6, 2005	Siding Spring	SSS	·	1.9 km	MPC · JPL
218604	2005 NB_{80}	—	July 10, 2005	Reedy Creek	J. Broughton	·	2.4 km	MPC · JPL
218605	2005 ND_{91}	—	July 5, 2005	Palomar	NEAT	·	1.8 km	MPC · JPL
218606	2005 NW_{99}	—	July 11, 2005	Anderson Mesa	LONEOS	NYS	2.1 km	MPC · JPL
218607	2005 NG_{124}	—	July 4, 2005	Palomar	NEAT	·	1.5 km	MPC · JPL
218608	2005 OD_{1}	—	July 19, 2005	Palomar	NEAT	·	2.0 km	MPC · JPL
218609	2005 OZ_{3}	—	July 26, 2005	Palomar	NEAT	·	2.8 km	MPC · JPL
218610	2005 OK_{15}	—	July 30, 2005	Vicques	M. Ory	V	1.1 km	MPC · JPL
218611	2005 PL	—	August 2, 2005	Kingsnake	J. V. McClusky	·	3.4 km	MPC · JPL
218612	2005 PY_{3}	—	August 1, 2005	Siding Spring	SSS	PHO	2.3 km	MPC · JPL
218613	2005 PE_{9}	—	August 4, 2005	Palomar	NEAT	·	1.3 km	MPC · JPL
218614	2005 PO_{12}	—	August 4, 2005	Palomar	NEAT	·	4.8 km	MPC · JPL
218615	2005 QT_{7}	—	August 24, 2005	Palomar	NEAT	·	3.0 km	MPC · JPL
218616	2005 QM_{42}	—	August 26, 2005	Haleakala	NEAT	·	1.8 km	MPC · JPL
218617	2005 QY_{42}	—	August 26, 2005	Anderson Mesa	LONEOS	·	2.9 km	MPC · JPL
218618	2005 QF_{50}	—	August 26, 2005	Palomar	NEAT	NEM	3.6 km	MPC · JPL
218619	2005 QG_{85}	—	August 30, 2005	Socorro	LINEAR	·	3.2 km	MPC · JPL
218620	2005 QK_{88}	—	August 24, 2005	Reedy Creek	J. Broughton	·	2.3 km	MPC · JPL
218621	2005 QW_{91}	—	August 26, 2005	Anderson Mesa	LONEOS	·	1.4 km	MPC · JPL
218622	2005 QU_{107}	—	August 27, 2005	Palomar	NEAT	(5)	1.1 km	MPC · JPL
218623	2005 QY_{108}	—	August 27, 2005	Palomar	NEAT	MAR	1.2 km	MPC · JPL
218624	2005 QQ_{138}	—	August 28, 2005	Kitt Peak	Spacewatch	·	1.4 km	MPC · JPL
218625	2005 QE_{153}	—	August 27, 2005	Campo Imperatore	CINEOS	(5)	2.2 km	MPC · JPL
218626	2005 QM_{172}	—	August 29, 2005	Palomar	NEAT	·	1.8 km	MPC · JPL
218627	2005 QP_{179}	—	August 26, 2005	Palomar	NEAT	HNS	2.0 km	MPC · JPL
218628	2005 QD_{182}	—	August 31, 2005	Palomar	NEAT	EUN	1.5 km	MPC · JPL
218629	2005 RN_{4}	—	September 6, 2005	Bergisch Gladbach	W. Bickel	·	2.6 km	MPC · JPL
218630	2005 RP_{19}	—	September 1, 2005	Kitt Peak	Spacewatch	·	1.5 km	MPC · JPL
218631	2005 RG_{24}	—	September 11, 2005	Anderson Mesa	LONEOS	JUN	2.1 km	MPC · JPL
218632	2005 RM_{24}	—	September 11, 2005	Anderson Mesa	LONEOS	·	3.8 km	MPC · JPL
218633	2005 RX_{29}	—	September 8, 2005	Socorro	LINEAR	·	1.4 km	MPC · JPL
218634	2005 RP_{31}	—	September 13, 2005	Anderson Mesa	LONEOS	·	3.6 km	MPC · JPL
218635	2005 RT_{31}	—	September 13, 2005	Socorro	LINEAR	ADE	2.9 km	MPC · JPL
218636 Calabria	2005 SN_{4}	Calabria	September 24, 2005	Vallemare Borbona	V. S. Casulli	·	2.3 km	MPC · JPL
218637	2005 SP_{15}	—	September 26, 2005	Kitt Peak	Spacewatch	·	1.8 km	MPC · JPL
218638	2005 SS_{18}	—	September 26, 2005	Kitt Peak	Spacewatch	·	1.3 km	MPC · JPL
218639	2005 SM_{19}	—	September 25, 2005	Calvin-Rehoboth	Calvin College	·	1.8 km	MPC · JPL
218640	2005 SR_{23}	—	September 23, 2005	Catalina	CSS	·	3.4 km	MPC · JPL
218641	2005 SF_{25}	—	September 25, 2005	Palomar	NEAT	·	2.6 km	MPC · JPL
218642	2005 SV_{26}	—	September 23, 2005	Kitt Peak	Spacewatch	·	2.1 km	MPC · JPL
218643	2005 SZ_{39}	—	September 24, 2005	Kitt Peak	Spacewatch	·	1.6 km	MPC · JPL
218644	2005 SJ_{47}	—	September 24, 2005	Kitt Peak	Spacewatch	·	2.3 km	MPC · JPL
218645	2005 SF_{54}	—	September 25, 2005	Kitt Peak	Spacewatch	·	2.4 km	MPC · JPL
218646	2005 SD_{65}	—	September 26, 2005	Palomar	NEAT	·	1.7 km	MPC · JPL
218647	2005 SW_{89}	—	September 24, 2005	Kitt Peak	Spacewatch	·	2.3 km	MPC · JPL
218648	2005 SP_{93}	—	September 24, 2005	Kitt Peak	Spacewatch	MIS	3.6 km	MPC · JPL
218649	2005 ST_{94}	—	September 25, 2005	Palomar	NEAT	·	2.5 km	MPC · JPL
218650	2005 SE_{95}	—	September 25, 2005	Palomar	NEAT	·	2.2 km	MPC · JPL
218651	2005 SD_{119}	—	September 28, 2005	Palomar	NEAT	ADE	2.4 km	MPC · JPL
218652	2005 SY_{125}	—	September 29, 2005	Palomar	NEAT	·	1.8 km	MPC · JPL
218653	2005 SB_{134}	—	September 30, 2005	Wrightwood	J. W. Young	·	2.4 km	MPC · JPL
218654	2005 SU_{144}	—	September 25, 2005	Kitt Peak	Spacewatch	(5)	1.3 km	MPC · JPL
218655	2005 SS_{151}	—	September 25, 2005	Kitt Peak	Spacewatch	·	2.6 km	MPC · JPL
218656	2005 SV_{152}	—	September 25, 2005	Palomar	NEAT	·	2.7 km	MPC · JPL
218657	2005 SO_{157}	—	September 26, 2005	Kitt Peak	Spacewatch	KOR	1.8 km	MPC · JPL
218658	2005 SP_{158}	—	September 26, 2005	Palomar	NEAT	·	3.0 km	MPC · JPL
218659	2005 SY_{158}	—	September 26, 2005	Kitt Peak	Spacewatch	·	1.9 km	MPC · JPL
218660	2005 SU_{163}	—	September 27, 2005	Palomar	NEAT	·	2.5 km	MPC · JPL
218661	2005 SW_{171}	—	September 29, 2005	Kitt Peak	Spacewatch	(5)	1.4 km	MPC · JPL
218662	2005 SS_{205}	—	September 30, 2005	Anderson Mesa	LONEOS	·	1.8 km	MPC · JPL
218663	2005 SH_{206}	—	September 30, 2005	Anderson Mesa	LONEOS	·	2.6 km	MPC · JPL
218664	2005 SW_{208}	—	September 30, 2005	Mount Lemmon	Mount Lemmon Survey	·	2.6 km	MPC · JPL
218665	2005 SE_{214}	—	September 30, 2005	Catalina	CSS	·	2.2 km	MPC · JPL
218666	2005 SW_{214}	—	September 30, 2005	Catalina	CSS	·	2.0 km	MPC · JPL
218667	2005 SN_{216}	—	September 30, 2005	Palomar	NEAT	·	2.3 km	MPC · JPL
218668	2005 SO_{220}	—	September 29, 2005	Catalina	CSS	EUN	1.8 km	MPC · JPL
218669	2005 SX_{220}	—	September 29, 2005	Catalina	CSS	·	2.6 km	MPC · JPL
218670	2005 SC_{221}	—	September 29, 2005	Catalina	CSS	EUN	2.1 km	MPC · JPL
218671	2005 SM_{236}	—	September 29, 2005	Kitt Peak	Spacewatch	AGN	1.5 km	MPC · JPL
218672	2005 SK_{242}	—	September 30, 2005	Kitt Peak	Spacewatch	·	2.0 km	MPC · JPL
218673	2005 SB_{247}	—	September 30, 2005	Kitt Peak	Spacewatch	PAD	1.8 km	MPC · JPL
218674	2005 SX_{255}	—	September 22, 2005	Palomar	NEAT	·	1.6 km	MPC · JPL
218675	2005 SK_{262}	—	September 23, 2005	Catalina	CSS	·	1.7 km	MPC · JPL
218676	2005 SQ_{270}	—	September 30, 2005	Anderson Mesa	LONEOS	·	1.8 km	MPC · JPL
218677	2005 SW_{278}	—	September 23, 2005	Catalina	CSS	EUN	2.1 km	MPC · JPL
218678	2005 TE_{5}	—	October 1, 2005	Catalina	CSS	(5)	2.1 km	MPC · JPL
218679 Sagamorehill	2005 TQ_{13}	Sagamorehill	October 3, 2005	Catalina	CSS	·	2.5 km	MPC · JPL
218680	2005 TE_{17}	—	October 1, 2005	Kitt Peak	Spacewatch	·	2.4 km	MPC · JPL
218681	2005 TV_{18}	—	October 1, 2005	Kitt Peak	Spacewatch	·	2.0 km	MPC · JPL
218682	2005 TM_{24}	—	October 1, 2005	Mount Lemmon	Mount Lemmon Survey	·	2.4 km	MPC · JPL
218683	2005 TT_{41}	—	October 3, 2005	Socorro	LINEAR	(5)	1.7 km	MPC · JPL
218684	2005 TW_{44}	—	October 5, 2005	Socorro	LINEAR	CLO	2.6 km	MPC · JPL
218685	2005 TG_{51}	—	October 12, 2005	Uccle	T. Pauwels	·	3.7 km	MPC · JPL
218686	2005 TK_{54}	—	October 1, 2005	Catalina	CSS	·	2.0 km	MPC · JPL
218687	2005 TA_{56}	—	October 6, 2005	Anderson Mesa	LONEOS	·	2.9 km	MPC · JPL
218688	2005 TD_{62}	—	October 4, 2005	Mount Lemmon	Mount Lemmon Survey	·	1.6 km	MPC · JPL
218689	2005 TR_{64}	—	October 7, 2005	Kitt Peak	Spacewatch	·	2.3 km	MPC · JPL
218690	2005 TU_{74}	—	October 1, 2005	Catalina	CSS	·	2.2 km	MPC · JPL
218691	2005 TF_{75}	—	October 2, 2005	Palomar	NEAT	·	2.9 km	MPC · JPL
218692 Leesnyder	2005 TW_{76}	Leesnyder	October 5, 2005	Catalina	CSS	EUN	2.0 km	MPC · JPL
218693	2005 TA_{78}	—	October 6, 2005	Anderson Mesa	LONEOS	MAR	2.1 km	MPC · JPL
218694	2005 TD_{79}	—	October 7, 2005	Kitt Peak	Spacewatch	·	2.5 km	MPC · JPL
218695	2005 TG_{79}	—	October 7, 2005	Mount Lemmon	Mount Lemmon Survey	EUN	1.6 km	MPC · JPL
218696	2005 TK_{83}	—	October 3, 2005	Socorro	LINEAR	(1547)	3.0 km	MPC · JPL
218697	2005 TT_{99}	—	October 7, 2005	Socorro	LINEAR	·	1.4 km	MPC · JPL
218698	2005 TS_{159}	—	October 9, 2005	Kitt Peak	Spacewatch	·	2.1 km	MPC · JPL
218699	2005 TD_{162}	—	October 9, 2005	Kitt Peak	Spacewatch	·	2.1 km	MPC · JPL
218700	2005 TO_{162}	—	October 9, 2005	Kitt Peak	Spacewatch	·	1.9 km	MPC · JPL

== 218701–218800 ==
back to top

Designation			Discovery			Properties		Ref
Permanent	Provisional	Named after	Date	Site	Discoverer(s)	Category	Diam.	Ref
218701	2005 TQ_{165}	—	October 9, 2005	Kitt Peak	Spacewatch	·	2.9 km	MPC · JPL
218702	2005 TR_{167}	—	October 9, 2005	Kitt Peak	Spacewatch	·	1.8 km	MPC · JPL
218703	2005 TH_{182}	—	October 3, 2005	Catalina	CSS	ADE	4.5 km	MPC · JPL
218704	2005 TW_{186}	—	October 3, 2005	Kitt Peak	Spacewatch	LEO	2.5 km	MPC · JPL
218705	2005 TL_{195}	—	October 1, 2005	Kitt Peak	Spacewatch	·	1.9 km	MPC · JPL
218706	2005 UT_{2}	—	October 22, 2005	Socorro	LINEAR	·	5.2 km	MPC · JPL
218707	2005 UD_{9}	—	October 21, 2005	Palomar	NEAT	·	2.4 km	MPC · JPL
218708	2005 UB_{17}	—	October 22, 2005	Kitt Peak	Spacewatch	·	2.6 km	MPC · JPL
218709	2005 UN_{19}	—	October 22, 2005	Kitt Peak	Spacewatch	·	2.2 km	MPC · JPL
218710	2005 UG_{20}	—	October 22, 2005	Catalina	CSS	·	2.9 km	MPC · JPL
218711	2005 UL_{29}	—	October 23, 2005	Catalina	CSS	·	2.0 km	MPC · JPL
218712	2005 UC_{33}	—	October 24, 2005	Kitt Peak	Spacewatch	THM	3.2 km	MPC · JPL
218713	2005 UY_{51}	—	October 23, 2005	Catalina	CSS	·	2.5 km	MPC · JPL
218714	2005 UA_{53}	—	October 23, 2005	Catalina	CSS	·	2.2 km	MPC · JPL
218715	2005 UF_{75}	—	October 24, 2005	Palomar	NEAT	MAR	2.0 km	MPC · JPL
218716	2005 UJ_{80}	—	October 25, 2005	Kitt Peak	Spacewatch	·	1.9 km	MPC · JPL
218717	2005 UM_{82}	—	October 22, 2005	Kitt Peak	Spacewatch	AGN	1.5 km	MPC · JPL
218718	2005 US_{118}	—	October 24, 2005	Kitt Peak	Spacewatch	·	2.6 km	MPC · JPL
218719	2005 UQ_{119}	—	October 24, 2005	Kitt Peak	Spacewatch	·	2.4 km	MPC · JPL
218720	2005 UC_{123}	—	October 24, 2005	Kitt Peak	Spacewatch	·	2.1 km	MPC · JPL
218721	2005 UW_{124}	—	October 24, 2005	Kitt Peak	Spacewatch	·	2.5 km	MPC · JPL
218722	2005 UE_{132}	—	October 24, 2005	Palomar	NEAT	·	3.3 km	MPC · JPL
218723	2005 UY_{140}	—	October 25, 2005	Mount Lemmon	Mount Lemmon Survey	·	2.6 km	MPC · JPL
218724	2005 UA_{160}	—	October 22, 2005	Catalina	CSS	·	3.1 km	MPC · JPL
218725	2005 UN_{166}	—	October 24, 2005	Kitt Peak	Spacewatch	·	2.1 km	MPC · JPL
218726	2005 UK_{203}	—	October 25, 2005	Mount Lemmon	Mount Lemmon Survey	·	1.9 km	MPC · JPL
218727	2005 US_{211}	—	October 27, 2005	Kitt Peak	Spacewatch	·	2.0 km	MPC · JPL
218728	2005 UA_{250}	—	October 23, 2005	Palomar	NEAT	·	2.9 km	MPC · JPL
218729	2005 UT_{250}	—	October 23, 2005	Catalina	CSS	GEF	2.3 km	MPC · JPL
218730	2005 UH_{255}	—	October 24, 2005	Kitt Peak	Spacewatch	·	2.1 km	MPC · JPL
218731	2005 UY_{256}	—	October 25, 2005	Kitt Peak	Spacewatch	·	2.2 km	MPC · JPL
218732	2005 UK_{275}	—	October 29, 2005	Kitt Peak	Spacewatch	·	2.6 km	MPC · JPL
218733	2005 UZ_{342}	—	October 31, 2005	Catalina	CSS	JUN	1.7 km	MPC · JPL
218734	2005 UA_{362}	—	October 27, 2005	Kitt Peak	Spacewatch	·	2.4 km	MPC · JPL
218735	2005 UZ_{364}	—	October 27, 2005	Kitt Peak	Spacewatch	·	2.9 km	MPC · JPL
218736	2005 UY_{411}	—	October 31, 2005	Mount Lemmon	Mount Lemmon Survey	KOR	1.5 km	MPC · JPL
218737	2005 UR_{436}	—	October 31, 2005	Kitt Peak	Spacewatch	·	2.0 km	MPC · JPL
218738	2005 UY_{440}	—	October 29, 2005	Socorro	LINEAR	·	2.9 km	MPC · JPL
218739	2005 UA_{444}	—	October 30, 2005	Socorro	LINEAR	·	3.3 km	MPC · JPL
218740	2005 UC_{444}	—	October 30, 2005	Socorro	LINEAR	·	1.7 km	MPC · JPL
218741	2005 UO_{457}	—	October 31, 2005	Palomar	NEAT	ADE	3.4 km	MPC · JPL
218742	2005 UH_{473}	—	October 30, 2005	Mount Lemmon	Mount Lemmon Survey	AGN	1.7 km	MPC · JPL
218743	2005 UT_{480}	—	October 25, 2005	Catalina	CSS	BAR	2.5 km	MPC · JPL
218744	2005 UX_{480}	—	October 25, 2005	Socorro	LINEAR	·	2.8 km	MPC · JPL
218745	2005 UV_{482}	—	October 22, 2005	Palomar	NEAT	EUN	1.3 km	MPC · JPL
218746	2005 UX_{482}	—	October 22, 2005	Catalina	CSS	AGN	1.7 km	MPC · JPL
218747	2005 UK_{486}	—	October 23, 2005	Palomar	NEAT	·	2.5 km	MPC · JPL
218748	2005 UT_{488}	—	October 23, 2005	Catalina	CSS	·	2.7 km	MPC · JPL
218749	2005 UA_{499}	—	October 27, 2005	Catalina	CSS	·	2.3 km	MPC · JPL
218750	2005 US_{512}	—	October 31, 2005	Catalina	CSS	·	2.6 km	MPC · JPL
218751	2005 UH_{513}	—	October 23, 2005	Catalina	CSS	·	2.3 km	MPC · JPL
218752 Tentlingen	2005 VC_{4}	Tentlingen	November 7, 2005	Marly	Observatoire Naef	·	2.6 km	MPC · JPL
218753	2005 VT_{23}	—	November 1, 2005	Kitt Peak	Spacewatch	·	2.2 km	MPC · JPL
218754	2005 VV_{30}	—	November 4, 2005	Kitt Peak	Spacewatch	TIR	5.8 km	MPC · JPL
218755	2005 VB_{51}	—	November 3, 2005	Catalina	CSS	·	2.5 km	MPC · JPL
218756	2005 VH_{77}	—	November 5, 2005	Anderson Mesa	LONEOS	·	2.0 km	MPC · JPL
218757	2005 VB_{91}	—	November 6, 2005	Kitt Peak	Spacewatch	·	2.7 km	MPC · JPL
218758	2005 VZ_{96}	—	November 5, 2005	Kitt Peak	Spacewatch	·	2.7 km	MPC · JPL
218759	2005 VR_{98}	—	November 10, 2005	Catalina	CSS	·	3.8 km	MPC · JPL
218760	2005 VD_{110}	—	November 6, 2005	Mount Lemmon	Mount Lemmon Survey	·	2.6 km	MPC · JPL
218761	2005 VG_{120}	—	November 3, 2005	Kitt Peak	Spacewatch	·	4.3 km	MPC · JPL
218762	2005 VS_{120}	—	November 11, 2005	Socorro	LINEAR	·	1.9 km	MPC · JPL
218763	2005 VW_{123}	—	November 11, 2005	Socorro	LINEAR	·	3.1 km	MPC · JPL
218764	2005 WO_{1}	—	November 21, 2005	Socorro	LINEAR	GAL	2.8 km	MPC · JPL
218765	2005 WO_{4}	—	November 20, 2005	Catalina	CSS	MAR	2.3 km	MPC · JPL
218766	2005 WS_{16}	—	November 22, 2005	Kitt Peak	Spacewatch	·	2.2 km	MPC · JPL
218767	2005 WX_{45}	—	November 22, 2005	Kitt Peak	Spacewatch	·	4.5 km	MPC · JPL
218768	2005 WW_{62}	—	November 25, 2005	Catalina	CSS	·	2.8 km	MPC · JPL
218769	2005 WV_{112}	—	November 25, 2005	Mount Lemmon	Mount Lemmon Survey	AST	2.1 km	MPC · JPL
218770	2005 WE_{114}	—	November 28, 2005	Kitt Peak	Spacewatch	AGN	1.5 km	MPC · JPL
218771	2005 WF_{119}	—	November 28, 2005	Socorro	LINEAR	·	2.5 km	MPC · JPL
218772	2005 WS_{120}	—	November 30, 2005	Kitt Peak	Spacewatch	·	2.2 km	MPC · JPL
218773	2005 WL_{148}	—	November 26, 2005	Catalina	CSS	WIT	1.5 km	MPC · JPL
218774	2005 WQ_{158}	—	November 28, 2005	Kitt Peak	Spacewatch	·	5.3 km	MPC · JPL
218775	2005 WF_{161}	—	November 28, 2005	Mount Lemmon	Mount Lemmon Survey	·	4.4 km	MPC · JPL
218776	2005 WA_{194}	—	November 29, 2005	Catalina	CSS	·	3.4 km	MPC · JPL
218777	2005 XS_{10}	—	December 1, 2005	Socorro	LINEAR	AGN	1.8 km	MPC · JPL
218778	2005 XL_{15}	—	December 1, 2005	Mount Lemmon	Mount Lemmon Survey	·	2.1 km	MPC · JPL
218779	2005 XB_{27}	—	December 4, 2005	Kitt Peak	Spacewatch	KOR	1.7 km	MPC · JPL
218780	2005 XD_{29}	—	December 2, 2005	Socorro	LINEAR	·	6.0 km	MPC · JPL
218781	2005 XF_{32}	—	December 4, 2005	Kitt Peak	Spacewatch	KOR	2.3 km	MPC · JPL
218782	2005 XW_{51}	—	December 2, 2005	Kitt Peak	Spacewatch	·	2.8 km	MPC · JPL
218783	2005 XR_{82}	—	December 10, 2005	Kitt Peak	Spacewatch	·	5.1 km	MPC · JPL
218784	2005 YQ_{1}	—	December 21, 2005	Catalina	CSS	·	4.3 km	MPC · JPL
218785	2005 YY_{13}	—	December 22, 2005	Kitt Peak	Spacewatch	·	3.5 km	MPC · JPL
218786	2005 YK_{29}	—	December 24, 2005	Kitt Peak	Spacewatch	KOR	1.7 km	MPC · JPL
218787	2005 YX_{74}	—	December 24, 2005	Kitt Peak	Spacewatch	·	6.9 km	MPC · JPL
218788	2005 YA_{165}	—	December 29, 2005	Socorro	LINEAR	·	1.4 km	MPC · JPL
218789	2005 YK_{166}	—	December 27, 2005	Kitt Peak	Spacewatch	·	5.2 km	MPC · JPL
218790	2005 YC_{181}	—	December 22, 2005	Catalina	CSS	·	6.4 km	MPC · JPL
218791	2005 YE_{184}	—	December 27, 2005	Kitt Peak	Spacewatch	CYB	6.2 km	MPC · JPL
218792	2005 YT_{189}	—	December 29, 2005	Kitt Peak	Spacewatch	·	3.5 km	MPC · JPL
218793	2006 AJ_{5}	—	January 2, 2006	Catalina	CSS	·	3.8 km	MPC · JPL
218794	2006 AS_{79}	—	January 5, 2006	Anderson Mesa	LONEOS	·	2.4 km	MPC · JPL
218795	2006 AO_{83}	—	January 5, 2006	Anderson Mesa	LONEOS	·	4.1 km	MPC · JPL
218796	2006 AO_{86}	—	January 3, 2006	Socorro	LINEAR	·	3.7 km	MPC · JPL
218797	2006 AD_{91}	—	January 6, 2006	Mount Lemmon	Mount Lemmon Survey	·	3.5 km	MPC · JPL
218798	2006 AX_{104}	—	January 8, 2006	Mount Lemmon	Mount Lemmon Survey	·	4.4 km	MPC · JPL
218799	2006 BM_{11}	—	January 20, 2006	Kitt Peak	Spacewatch	·	4.3 km	MPC · JPL
218800	2006 BN_{43}	—	January 23, 2006	Kitt Peak	Spacewatch	·	5.5 km	MPC · JPL

== 218801–218900 ==
back to top

Designation			Discovery			Properties		Ref
Permanent	Provisional	Named after	Date	Site	Discoverer(s)	Category	Diam.	Ref
218801	2006 BC_{99}	—	January 28, 2006	Mount Lemmon	Mount Lemmon Survey	·	3.9 km	MPC · JPL
218802	2006 BF_{140}	—	January 21, 2006	Mount Lemmon	Mount Lemmon Survey	·	3.4 km	MPC · JPL
218803	2006 BS_{214}	—	January 24, 2006	Anderson Mesa	LONEOS	·	5.8 km	MPC · JPL
218804	2006 BB_{252}	—	January 31, 2006	Kitt Peak	Spacewatch	L5	9.8 km	MPC · JPL
218805	2006 CU_{33}	—	February 2, 2006	Mount Lemmon	Mount Lemmon Survey	·	4.1 km	MPC · JPL
218806	2006 DE_{1}	—	February 21, 2006	Calvin-Rehoboth	L. A. Molnar	·	4.2 km	MPC · JPL
218807	2006 DM_{44}	—	February 20, 2006	Catalina	CSS	HYG	4.1 km	MPC · JPL
218808	2006 DM_{56}	—	February 24, 2006	Mount Lemmon	Mount Lemmon Survey	HYG	4.4 km	MPC · JPL
218809	2006 GH_{32}	—	April 7, 2006	Mount Lemmon	Mount Lemmon Survey	·	3.8 km	MPC · JPL
218810	2006 GF_{38}	—	April 2, 2006	Anderson Mesa	LONEOS	·	2.0 km	MPC · JPL
218811	2006 PD_{5}	—	August 12, 2006	Palomar	NEAT	·	1.3 km	MPC · JPL
218812	2006 RR_{94}	—	September 15, 2006	Kitt Peak	Spacewatch	·	780 m	MPC · JPL
218813	2006 SO_{14}	—	September 17, 2006	Catalina	CSS	·	900 m	MPC · JPL
218814	2006 SV_{14}	—	September 17, 2006	Catalina	CSS	·	1.1 km	MPC · JPL
218815	2006 SE_{36}	—	September 17, 2006	Anderson Mesa	LONEOS	·	4.4 km	MPC · JPL
218816	2006 SL_{115}	—	September 24, 2006	Kitt Peak	Spacewatch	·	1.3 km	MPC · JPL
218817	2006 SS_{175}	—	September 25, 2006	Mount Lemmon	Mount Lemmon Survey	·	2.8 km	MPC · JPL
218818	2006 SA_{263}	—	September 26, 2006	Mount Lemmon	Mount Lemmon Survey	·	1 km	MPC · JPL
218819	2006 SZ_{265}	—	September 26, 2006	Kitt Peak	Spacewatch	·	1.1 km	MPC · JPL
218820	2006 SN_{349}	—	September 29, 2006	Kitt Peak	Spacewatch	·	1.3 km	MPC · JPL
218821	2006 TE_{4}	—	October 2, 2006	Mount Lemmon	Mount Lemmon Survey	·	1 km	MPC · JPL
218822	2006 TF_{19}	—	October 11, 2006	Kitt Peak	Spacewatch	·	750 m	MPC · JPL
218823	2006 TN_{22}	—	October 11, 2006	Kitt Peak	Spacewatch	·	870 m	MPC · JPL
218824	2006 TD_{26}	—	October 12, 2006	Kitt Peak	Spacewatch	·	860 m	MPC · JPL
218825	2006 TX_{34}	—	October 12, 2006	Kitt Peak	Spacewatch	·	920 m	MPC · JPL
218826	2006 TJ_{45}	—	October 12, 2006	Kitt Peak	Spacewatch	·	900 m	MPC · JPL
218827	2006 TJ_{68}	—	October 11, 2006	Palomar	NEAT	·	1.3 km	MPC · JPL
218828	2006 TG_{79}	—	October 12, 2006	Kitt Peak	Spacewatch	V	920 m	MPC · JPL
218829	2006 TM_{79}	—	October 12, 2006	Palomar	NEAT	·	1.1 km	MPC · JPL
218830	2006 TD_{85}	—	October 13, 2006	Kitt Peak	Spacewatch	·	1.1 km	MPC · JPL
218831	2006 TX_{101}	—	October 15, 2006	Kitt Peak	Spacewatch	·	790 m	MPC · JPL
218832	2006 TV_{105}	—	October 12, 2006	Palomar	NEAT	BAP	1.3 km	MPC · JPL
218833	2006 UH_{6}	—	October 16, 2006	Catalina	CSS	·	950 m	MPC · JPL
218834	2006 UN_{19}	—	October 16, 2006	Kitt Peak	Spacewatch	·	2.2 km	MPC · JPL
218835	2006 UX_{40}	—	October 16, 2006	Kitt Peak	Spacewatch	·	900 m	MPC · JPL
218836	2006 UY_{41}	—	October 16, 2006	Kitt Peak	Spacewatch	·	2.7 km	MPC · JPL
218837	2006 UL_{55}	—	October 17, 2006	Kitt Peak	Spacewatch	·	900 m	MPC · JPL
218838	2006 UW_{64}	—	October 23, 2006	Kitami	K. Endate	·	980 m	MPC · JPL
218839	2006 UA_{71}	—	October 16, 2006	Catalina	CSS	(883)	1.1 km	MPC · JPL
218840	2006 UG_{86}	—	October 17, 2006	Catalina	CSS	(883)	1.0 km	MPC · JPL
218841	2006 US_{87}	—	October 17, 2006	Mount Lemmon	Mount Lemmon Survey	·	1.6 km	MPC · JPL
218842	2006 UY_{179}	—	October 16, 2006	Catalina	CSS	·	1.2 km	MPC · JPL
218843	2006 UZ_{202}	—	October 22, 2006	Palomar	NEAT	·	970 m	MPC · JPL
218844	2006 UQ_{204}	—	October 22, 2006	Palomar	NEAT	·	1.2 km	MPC · JPL
218845	2006 UY_{209}	—	October 23, 2006	Kitt Peak	Spacewatch	·	1.0 km	MPC · JPL
218846	2006 UR_{228}	—	October 20, 2006	Palomar	NEAT	·	930 m	MPC · JPL
218847	2006 UP_{241}	—	October 23, 2006	Mount Lemmon	Mount Lemmon Survey	·	3.8 km	MPC · JPL
218848	2006 UQ_{327}	—	October 31, 2006	Mount Lemmon	Mount Lemmon Survey	·	1.9 km	MPC · JPL
218849	2006 UL_{338}	—	October 28, 2006	Mount Lemmon	Mount Lemmon Survey	·	1.6 km	MPC · JPL
218850	2006 VW_{13}	—	November 14, 2006	Catalina	CSS	·	1.1 km	MPC · JPL
218851	2006 VP_{34}	—	November 11, 2006	Catalina	CSS	·	990 m	MPC · JPL
218852	2006 VV_{41}	—	November 12, 2006	Mount Lemmon	Mount Lemmon Survey	·	1.2 km	MPC · JPL
218853	2006 VO_{51}	—	November 10, 2006	Kitt Peak	Spacewatch	·	1.7 km	MPC · JPL
218854	2006 VK_{88}	—	November 14, 2006	Mount Lemmon	Mount Lemmon Survey	·	1.5 km	MPC · JPL
218855	2006 VC_{94}	—	November 15, 2006	Catalina	CSS	·	1.1 km	MPC · JPL
218856	2006 VN_{105}	—	November 13, 2006	Kitt Peak	Spacewatch	·	800 m	MPC · JPL
218857	2006 WB_{80}	—	November 18, 2006	Kitt Peak	Spacewatch	·	870 m	MPC · JPL
218858	2006 WO_{80}	—	November 18, 2006	Kitt Peak	Spacewatch	·	1.4 km	MPC · JPL
218859	2006 WD_{82}	—	November 18, 2006	Kitt Peak	Spacewatch	PHO	1.3 km	MPC · JPL
218860	2006 WR_{101}	—	November 19, 2006	Catalina	CSS	·	920 m	MPC · JPL
218861	2006 WX_{112}	—	November 19, 2006	Kitt Peak	Spacewatch	·	1.1 km	MPC · JPL
218862	2006 WK_{123}	—	November 21, 2006	Mount Lemmon	Mount Lemmon Survey	·	1.9 km	MPC · JPL
218863	2006 WO_{127}	—	November 23, 2006	Catalina	CSS	APO +1km · slow	1.2 km	MPC · JPL
218864	2006 WF_{162}	—	November 23, 2006	Kitt Peak	Spacewatch	·	1.3 km	MPC · JPL
218865	2006 WY_{204}	—	November 17, 2006	Kitt Peak	Spacewatch	·	2.2 km	MPC · JPL
218866 Alexantioch	2006 XL_{4}	Alexantioch	December 15, 2006	Vallemare Borbona	V. S. Casulli	·	2.6 km	MPC · JPL
218867	2006 XB_{21}	—	December 11, 2006	Kitt Peak	Spacewatch	·	1.7 km	MPC · JPL
218868	2006 XH_{31}	—	December 12, 2006	Marly	P. Kocher	·	3.6 km	MPC · JPL
218869	2006 XO_{53}	—	December 14, 2006	Catalina	CSS	·	1.3 km	MPC · JPL
218870	2006 XS_{53}	—	December 15, 2006	Mount Lemmon	Mount Lemmon Survey	·	2.0 km	MPC · JPL
218871	2006 YL_{1}	—	December 16, 2006	Kitt Peak	Spacewatch	·	1.9 km	MPC · JPL
218872	2006 YX_{14}	—	December 16, 2006	Kitt Peak	Spacewatch	·	1.9 km	MPC · JPL
218873	2006 YS_{16}	—	December 21, 2006	Kitt Peak	Spacewatch	MAR	1.9 km	MPC · JPL
218874	2006 YW_{37}	—	December 21, 2006	Kitt Peak	Spacewatch	·	1.8 km	MPC · JPL
218875	2006 YU_{46}	—	December 21, 2006	Kitt Peak	Spacewatch	·	2.6 km	MPC · JPL
218876	2007 AH_{8}	—	January 10, 2007	Mount Nyukasa	Japan Aerospace Exploration Agency	NYS	1.5 km	MPC · JPL
218877	2007 AC_{27}	—	January 10, 2007	Mount Lemmon	Mount Lemmon Survey	·	1.5 km	MPC · JPL
218878	2007 BK_{4}	—	January 16, 2007	Catalina	CSS	·	1.7 km	MPC · JPL
218879	2007 BH_{5}	—	January 17, 2007	Palomar	NEAT	·	2.3 km	MPC · JPL
218880	2007 BO_{22}	—	January 24, 2007	Socorro	LINEAR	·	2.8 km	MPC · JPL
218881	2007 BN_{55}	—	January 24, 2007	Socorro	LINEAR	·	1.8 km	MPC · JPL
218882	2007 BT_{57}	—	January 24, 2007	Catalina	CSS	·	2.6 km	MPC · JPL
218883	2007 BM_{77}	—	January 17, 2007	Palomar	NEAT	·	1.6 km	MPC · JPL
218884	2007 CO_{7}	—	February 6, 2007	Kitt Peak	Spacewatch	·	3.0 km	MPC · JPL
218885	2007 CT_{10}	—	February 6, 2007	Mount Lemmon	Mount Lemmon Survey	·	1.6 km	MPC · JPL
218886	2007 CR_{21}	—	February 6, 2007	Palomar	NEAT	·	1.4 km	MPC · JPL
218887	2007 CY_{22}	—	February 6, 2007	Mount Lemmon	Mount Lemmon Survey	·	2.8 km	MPC · JPL
218888	2007 CV_{40}	—	February 7, 2007	Kitt Peak	Spacewatch	·	3.0 km	MPC · JPL
218889	2007 CU_{41}	—	February 7, 2007	Kitt Peak	Spacewatch	·	5.6 km	MPC · JPL
218890	2007 CT_{63}	—	February 15, 2007	Palomar	NEAT	·	4.5 km	MPC · JPL
218891	2007 DY_{11}	—	February 16, 2007	Catalina	CSS	·	2.1 km	MPC · JPL
218892	2007 DZ_{24}	—	February 17, 2007	Kitt Peak	Spacewatch	·	3.6 km	MPC · JPL
218893	2007 DX_{35}	—	February 17, 2007	Kitt Peak	Spacewatch	·	3.9 km	MPC · JPL
218894	2007 DO_{60}	—	February 22, 2007	Anderson Mesa	LONEOS	NYS	1.4 km	MPC · JPL
218895	2007 DM_{68}	—	February 21, 2007	Kitt Peak	Spacewatch	·	4.7 km	MPC · JPL
218896	2007 DX_{70}	—	February 21, 2007	Kitt Peak	Spacewatch	·	3.2 km	MPC · JPL
218897	2007 DT_{81}	—	February 23, 2007	Socorro	LINEAR	·	2.7 km	MPC · JPL
218898	2007 DU_{102}	—	February 25, 2007	Catalina	CSS	H	890 m	MPC · JPL
218899	2007 EO_{1}	—	March 9, 2007	Kitt Peak	Spacewatch	·	2.4 km	MPC · JPL
218900 Gabybuchholz	2007 EO_{9}	Gabybuchholz	March 8, 2007	Wildberg	R. Apitzsch	·	2.2 km	MPC · JPL

== 218901–219000 ==
back to top

Designation			Discovery			Properties		Ref
Permanent	Provisional	Named after	Date	Site	Discoverer(s)	Category	Diam.	Ref
218901 Gerdbuchholz	2007 EC_{10}	Gerdbuchholz	March 10, 2007	Wildberg	R. Apitzsch	·	3.3 km	MPC · JPL
218902	2007 EW_{12}	—	March 9, 2007	Catalina	CSS	·	5.0 km	MPC · JPL
218903	2007 EJ_{16}	—	March 9, 2007	Palomar	NEAT	·	6.3 km	MPC · JPL
218904	2007 EV_{36}	—	March 11, 2007	Mount Lemmon	Mount Lemmon Survey	EOS	3.8 km	MPC · JPL
218905	2007 EV_{51}	—	March 11, 2007	Catalina	CSS	·	2.5 km	MPC · JPL
218906	2007 ES_{122}	—	March 14, 2007	Kitt Peak	Spacewatch	·	2.6 km	MPC · JPL
218907	2007 EW_{126}	—	March 9, 2007	Mount Lemmon	Mount Lemmon Survey	NYS	1.5 km	MPC · JPL
218908	2007 ET_{161}	—	March 15, 2007	Mount Lemmon	Mount Lemmon Survey	EOS	2.1 km	MPC · JPL
218909	2007 EJ_{218}	—	March 10, 2007	Mount Lemmon	Mount Lemmon Survey	·	3.0 km	MPC · JPL
218910	2007 EV_{218}	—	March 11, 2007	Mount Lemmon	Mount Lemmon Survey	·	2.6 km	MPC · JPL
218911	2007 FQ_{24}	—	March 20, 2007	Mount Lemmon	Mount Lemmon Survey	·	3.6 km	MPC · JPL
218912	2007 GJ_{30}	—	April 14, 2007	Mount Lemmon	Mount Lemmon Survey	·	1.4 km	MPC · JPL
218913	2007 HN_{53}	—	April 20, 2007	Kitt Peak	Spacewatch	·	2.1 km	MPC · JPL
218914 Tangauchin	2007 KG_{9}	Tangauchin	May 19, 2007	XuYi	PMO NEO Survey Program	·	3.3 km	MPC · JPL
218915	2007 PL_{27}	—	August 13, 2007	La Sagra	OAM	·	1.4 km	MPC · JPL
218916	2007 SD_{12}	—	September 27, 2007	Mount Lemmon	Mount Lemmon Survey	H	1.0 km	MPC · JPL
218917	2007 TJ_{68}	—	October 11, 2007	La Sagra	OAM	·	5.8 km	MPC · JPL
218918	2007 TV_{138}	—	October 9, 2007	Catalina	CSS	·	4.4 km	MPC · JPL
218919	2007 TB_{218}	—	October 7, 2007	Kitt Peak	Spacewatch	EUN ·	3.4 km	MPC · JPL
218920	2007 TB_{240}	—	October 14, 2007	Socorro	LINEAR	·	3.7 km	MPC · JPL
218921	2007 TR_{357}	—	October 13, 2007	Anderson Mesa	LONEOS	·	2.6 km	MPC · JPL
218922	2007 TA_{361}	—	October 14, 2007	Mount Lemmon	Mount Lemmon Survey	·	2.6 km	MPC · JPL
218923	2007 UE_{1}	—	October 16, 2007	Bisei SG Center	BATTeRS	·	5.7 km	MPC · JPL
218924	2007 UF_{104}	—	October 30, 2007	Kitt Peak	Spacewatch	·	2.3 km	MPC · JPL
218925	2007 VV_{92}	—	November 3, 2007	Socorro	LINEAR	EOS	2.5 km	MPC · JPL
218926	2007 VA_{242}	—	November 12, 2007	Catalina	CSS	·	1.9 km	MPC · JPL
218927	2007 YL_{16}	—	December 16, 2007	Kitt Peak	Spacewatch	KOR	2.1 km	MPC · JPL
218928	2008 AJ_{114}	—	January 15, 2008	Mount Lemmon	Mount Lemmon Survey	·	1.1 km	MPC · JPL
218929	2008 BP_{15}	—	January 28, 2008	Lulin	LUSS	·	2.2 km	MPC · JPL
218930	2008 BW_{21}	—	January 30, 2008	Mount Lemmon	Mount Lemmon Survey	·	840 m	MPC · JPL
218931	2008 BL_{41}	—	January 30, 2008	Catalina	CSS	·	970 m	MPC · JPL
218932	2008 CW_{1}	—	February 1, 2008	La Sagra	OAM	·	2.6 km	MPC · JPL
218933	2008 CY_{16}	—	February 3, 2008	Kitt Peak	Spacewatch	MAS	990 m	MPC · JPL
218934	2008 CL_{25}	—	February 1, 2008	Kitt Peak	Spacewatch	·	880 m	MPC · JPL
218935	2008 CG_{66}	—	February 8, 2008	Mount Lemmon	Mount Lemmon Survey	MAS	1.1 km	MPC · JPL
218936	2008 CK_{77}	—	February 6, 2008	Catalina	CSS	·	2.1 km	MPC · JPL
218937	2008 CU_{119}	—	February 14, 2008	Grove Creek	Tozzi, F.	·	2.9 km	MPC · JPL
218938	2008 CN_{143}	—	February 8, 2008	Kitt Peak	Spacewatch	·	2.1 km	MPC · JPL
218939	2008 CO_{143}	—	February 8, 2008	Kitt Peak	Spacewatch	DOR	3.8 km	MPC · JPL
218940	2008 CH_{156}	—	February 9, 2008	Kitt Peak	Spacewatch	NYS	1.6 km	MPC · JPL
218941	2008 CV_{164}	—	February 10, 2008	Mount Lemmon	Mount Lemmon Survey	·	950 m	MPC · JPL
218942	2008 CK_{165}	—	February 10, 2008	Kitt Peak	Spacewatch	·	2.1 km	MPC · JPL
218943	2008 DP_{13}	—	February 26, 2008	Mount Lemmon	Mount Lemmon Survey	·	860 m	MPC · JPL
218944	2008 DG_{20}	—	February 28, 2008	Mount Lemmon	Mount Lemmon Survey	NYS	1.8 km	MPC · JPL
218945	2008 DK_{23}	—	February 26, 2008	Mount Lemmon	Mount Lemmon Survey	·	2.0 km	MPC · JPL
218946	2008 DD_{30}	—	February 26, 2008	Mount Lemmon	Mount Lemmon Survey	NYS	1.5 km	MPC · JPL
218947	2008 DN_{33}	—	February 27, 2008	Catalina	CSS	PHO	1.7 km	MPC · JPL
218948	2008 DY_{39}	—	February 27, 2008	Mount Lemmon	Mount Lemmon Survey	·	2.3 km	MPC · JPL
218949	2008 DF_{40}	—	February 27, 2008	Kitt Peak	Spacewatch	·	2.3 km	MPC · JPL
218950	2008 DW_{68}	—	February 29, 2008	Kitt Peak	Spacewatch	·	2.2 km	MPC · JPL
218951	2008 DJ_{72}	—	February 26, 2008	Mount Lemmon	Mount Lemmon Survey	·	2.0 km	MPC · JPL
218952	2008 DO_{79}	—	February 29, 2008	Catalina	CSS	PHO	1.5 km	MPC · JPL
218953	2008 DN_{84}	—	February 26, 2008	Mount Lemmon	Mount Lemmon Survey	·	2.0 km	MPC · JPL
218954	2008 EM_{11}	—	March 1, 2008	Kitt Peak	Spacewatch	·	2.4 km	MPC · JPL
218955	2008 ES_{21}	—	March 2, 2008	Kitt Peak	Spacewatch	MRX	1.4 km	MPC · JPL
218956	2008 EV_{22}	—	March 3, 2008	Catalina	CSS	MAS	1.2 km	MPC · JPL
218957	2008 EE_{40}	—	March 4, 2008	Kitt Peak	Spacewatch	·	890 m	MPC · JPL
218958	2008 EE_{43}	—	March 4, 2008	Mount Lemmon	Mount Lemmon Survey	MRX	1.6 km	MPC · JPL
218959	2008 EQ_{68}	—	March 7, 2008	Mount Lemmon	Mount Lemmon Survey	T_{j} (2.98) · EUP	5.7 km	MPC · JPL
218960	2008 EQ_{83}	—	March 9, 2008	Socorro	LINEAR	·	2.4 km	MPC · JPL
218961	2008 EM_{109}	—	March 7, 2008	Mount Lemmon	Mount Lemmon Survey	·	1.8 km	MPC · JPL
218962	2008 ED_{146}	—	March 11, 2008	Mount Lemmon	Mount Lemmon Survey	·	3.0 km	MPC · JPL
218963	2008 EQ_{146}	—	March 5, 2008	Mount Lemmon	Mount Lemmon Survey	·	2.0 km	MPC · JPL
218964	2008 FP_{22}	—	March 27, 2008	Kitt Peak	Spacewatch	·	1.2 km	MPC · JPL
218965	2008 FV_{22}	—	March 27, 2008	Kitt Peak	Spacewatch	·	3.5 km	MPC · JPL
218966	2008 FV_{26}	—	March 27, 2008	Kitt Peak	Spacewatch	·	1.7 km	MPC · JPL
218967	2008 FB_{28}	—	March 27, 2008	Kitt Peak	Spacewatch	·	2.9 km	MPC · JPL
218968	2008 FS_{29}	—	March 28, 2008	Kitt Peak	Spacewatch	NYS	1.7 km	MPC · JPL
218969	2008 FH_{33}	—	March 28, 2008	Mount Lemmon	Mount Lemmon Survey	·	1.1 km	MPC · JPL
218970	2008 FM_{38}	—	March 28, 2008	Kitt Peak	Spacewatch	·	3.1 km	MPC · JPL
218971	2008 FG_{42}	—	March 28, 2008	Mount Lemmon	Mount Lemmon Survey	NYS	2.1 km	MPC · JPL
218972	2008 FH_{52}	—	March 28, 2008	Mount Lemmon	Mount Lemmon Survey	·	3.1 km	MPC · JPL
218973	2008 FW_{57}	—	March 28, 2008	Mount Lemmon	Mount Lemmon Survey	AGN	1.8 km	MPC · JPL
218974	2008 FF_{60}	—	March 29, 2008	Catalina	CSS	·	2.0 km	MPC · JPL
218975	2008 FX_{85}	—	March 28, 2008	Mount Lemmon	Mount Lemmon Survey	NYS	1.5 km	MPC · JPL
218976	2008 FT_{101}	—	March 30, 2008	Kitt Peak	Spacewatch	·	2.6 km	MPC · JPL
218977	2008 FD_{117}	—	March 31, 2008	Kitt Peak	Spacewatch	MAS	950 m	MPC · JPL
218978	2008 FQ_{117}	—	March 31, 2008	Kitt Peak	Spacewatch	KOR	2.2 km	MPC · JPL
218979	2008 FT_{123}	—	March 29, 2008	Kitt Peak	Spacewatch	(5)	1.6 km	MPC · JPL
218980	2008 FY_{124}	—	March 30, 2008	Catalina	CSS	·	3.1 km	MPC · JPL
218981	2008 FW_{126}	—	March 29, 2008	Kitt Peak	Spacewatch	·	2.8 km	MPC · JPL
218982	2008 GM_{60}	—	April 5, 2008	Catalina	CSS	MRX	1.8 km	MPC · JPL
218983	2008 GV_{69}	—	April 6, 2008	Mount Lemmon	Mount Lemmon Survey	EOS	2.6 km	MPC · JPL
218984	2008 GS_{72}	—	April 7, 2008	Mount Lemmon	Mount Lemmon Survey	·	1.8 km	MPC · JPL
218985	2008 GU_{104}	—	April 11, 2008	Kitt Peak	Spacewatch	·	2.1 km	MPC · JPL
218986	2008 GN_{112}	—	April 5, 2008	Črni Vrh	Mikuž, H.	·	4.2 km	MPC · JPL
218987 Heidenhain	2008 HV_{2}	Heidenhain	April 26, 2008	Gaisberg	Gierlinger, R.	·	2.6 km	MPC · JPL
218988	2008 HH_{9}	—	April 24, 2008	Kitt Peak	Spacewatch	·	3.9 km	MPC · JPL
218989	2008 HT_{11}	—	April 24, 2008	Catalina	CSS	·	4.2 km	MPC · JPL
218990	2008 HL_{13}	—	April 25, 2008	Kitt Peak	Spacewatch	·	1.8 km	MPC · JPL
218991	2008 HB_{17}	—	April 25, 2008	Kitt Peak	Spacewatch	·	2.0 km	MPC · JPL
218992	2008 HJ_{17}	—	April 26, 2008	Kitt Peak	Spacewatch	·	2.3 km	MPC · JPL
218993	2008 HO_{28}	—	April 28, 2008	Kitt Peak	Spacewatch	·	1.6 km	MPC · JPL
218994	2008 HY_{29}	—	April 28, 2008	Kitt Peak	Spacewatch	·	2.7 km	MPC · JPL
218995	2008 HW_{38}	—	April 26, 2008	Mount Lemmon	Mount Lemmon Survey	(13314)	2.2 km	MPC · JPL
218996	2008 HN_{44}	—	April 27, 2008	Mount Lemmon	Mount Lemmon Survey	·	2.3 km	MPC · JPL
218997	2008 HC_{60}	—	April 28, 2008	Mount Lemmon	Mount Lemmon Survey	·	4.9 km	MPC · JPL
218998 Navi	2008 JZ_{2}	Navi	May 3, 2008	Marly	P. Kocher	·	1.6 km	MPC · JPL
218999	2008 JQ_{9}	—	May 3, 2008	Kitt Peak	Spacewatch	·	2.8 km	MPC · JPL
219000	2008 JW_{17}	—	May 4, 2008	Kitt Peak	Spacewatch	·	4.4 km	MPC · JPL

back to top

== See also ==
- Meanings of minor-planet names: 218001–219000
