= List of minor planets: 770001–771000 =

The following is a partial list of minor planets, running from minor-planet number 770001 through 771000, inclusive. The primary data for this and other partial lists is based on JPL's "Small-Body Orbital Elements" and data available from the Minor Planet Center. Critical list information is also provided by the MPC, unless otherwise specified from Lowell Observatory. A detailed description of the table's columns and additional sources are given on the main page including a complete list of every page in this series, and a statistical break-up on the dynamical classification of minor planets.

Also see the summary list of all named bodies in numerical and alphabetical order, and the corresponding naming citations for the number range of this particular list. New namings may only be added to this list after official publication, as the preannouncement of names is condemned by the Working Group for Small Bodies Nomenclature of the International Astronomical Union.

Near-Earth obj.	MBA (inner)	MBA (outer)	Centaur
Mars-crosser	MBA (middle)	Jupiter trojan	Trans-Neptunian obj.
Unclassified

== 770001–770100 ==
Designation			Discovery			Properties		Ref
Permanent	Provisional	Named after	Date	Site	Discoverer(s)	Category	Diam.	Ref
770001	2015 UT_{41}	—	February 2, 2008	Mount Lemmon	Mount Lemmon Survey	·	1.2 km	MPC · JPL
770002	2015 UD_{44}	—	December 6, 2011	Haleakala	Pan-STARRS 1	·	880 m	MPC · JPL
770003	2015 UZ_{45}	—	September 12, 2015	Haleakala	Pan-STARRS 1	HNS	930 m	MPC · JPL
770004	2015 US_{46}	—	September 12, 2015	Haleakala	Pan-STARRS 1	·	1.5 km	MPC · JPL
770005	2015 UU_{47}	—	October 18, 2015	Haleakala	Pan-STARRS 1	·	1.4 km	MPC · JPL
770006	2015 UY_{47}	—	October 18, 2015	Haleakala	Pan-STARRS 1	·	1.6 km	MPC · JPL
770007	2015 UG_{48}	—	November 22, 2006	Mount Lemmon	Mount Lemmon Survey	DOR	1.5 km	MPC · JPL
770008	2015 UR_{48}	—	October 18, 2015	Haleakala	Pan-STARRS 1	·	1.2 km	MPC · JPL
770009	2015 UJ_{50}	—	July 25, 2014	Haleakala	Pan-STARRS 1	·	1.5 km	MPC · JPL
770010	2015 UF_{51}	—	April 29, 2014	Haleakala	Pan-STARRS 1	·	1.4 km	MPC · JPL
770011	2015 UL_{54}	—	September 27, 2006	Kitt Peak	Spacewatch	·	1.3 km	MPC · JPL
770012	2015 UO_{55}	—	April 18, 2009	Mount Lemmon	Mount Lemmon Survey	·	1.3 km	MPC · JPL
770013	2015 UZ_{55}	—	May 8, 2014	Haleakala	Pan-STARRS 1	·	1.1 km	MPC · JPL
770014	2015 UE_{56}	—	December 6, 2011	Haleakala	Pan-STARRS 1	·	1.0 km	MPC · JPL
770015	2015 UB_{57}	—	October 19, 2015	Haleakala	Pan-STARRS 1	·	1.2 km	MPC · JPL
770016	2015 UN_{57}	—	September 11, 2015	Haleakala	Pan-STARRS 1	·	940 m	MPC · JPL
770017	2015 UZ_{58}	—	October 9, 2015	Haleakala	Pan-STARRS 1	·	950 m	MPC · JPL
770018	2015 UE_{59}	—	January 2, 2012	Mount Lemmon	Mount Lemmon Survey	·	1.1 km	MPC · JPL
770019	2015 UE_{60}	—	January 10, 2008	Mount Lemmon	Mount Lemmon Survey	·	1.4 km	MPC · JPL
770020	2015 UA_{65}	—	December 31, 2007	Kitt Peak	Spacewatch	HNS	800 m	MPC · JPL
770021	2015 UH_{66}	—	July 31, 2014	Haleakala	Pan-STARRS 1	·	2.7 km	MPC · JPL
770022	2015 UL_{70}	—	September 11, 2015	Haleakala	Pan-STARRS 1	·	1.3 km	MPC · JPL
770023	2015 UK_{72}	—	May 8, 2014	Haleakala	Pan-STARRS 1	·	1.2 km	MPC · JPL
770024	2015 UY_{75}	—	November 18, 2011	Mount Lemmon	Mount Lemmon Survey	ADE	1.4 km	MPC · JPL
770025	2015 UR_{76}	—	May 27, 2014	Haleakala	Pan-STARRS 1	·	1.6 km	MPC · JPL
770026	2015 US_{79}	—	October 24, 2015	Haleakala	Pan-STARRS 1	EUN	760 m	MPC · JPL
770027	2015 UY_{79}	—	September 11, 2015	Haleakala	Pan-STARRS 1	·	1.3 km	MPC · JPL
770028	2015 UN_{80}	—	December 26, 2011	Les Engarouines	L. Bernasconi	·	1.5 km	MPC · JPL
770029	2015 UD_{81}	—	October 24, 2015	Haleakala	Pan-STARRS 1	·	1.7 km	MPC · JPL
770030	2015 UG_{81}	—	December 29, 2011	Mount Lemmon	Mount Lemmon Survey	·	1.1 km	MPC · JPL
770031	2015 UT_{85}	—	April 21, 2012	Haleakala	Pan-STARRS 1	·	2.2 km	MPC · JPL
770032	2015 UD_{86}	—	October 24, 2015	Haleakala	Pan-STARRS 1	·	1.2 km	MPC · JPL
770033	2015 US_{86}	—	October 27, 2006	Catalina	CSS	·	1.5 km	MPC · JPL
770034	2015 UG_{88}	—	October 12, 2006	Kitt Peak	Spacewatch	·	1.3 km	MPC · JPL
770035	2015 US_{88}	—	January 27, 2012	Mount Lemmon	Mount Lemmon Survey	·	2.1 km	MPC · JPL
770036	2015 UY_{88}	—	January 4, 2012	Mount Lemmon	Mount Lemmon Survey	·	1.5 km	MPC · JPL
770037	2015 UC_{89}	—	August 28, 2014	Haleakala	Pan-STARRS 1	·	2.3 km	MPC · JPL
770038	2015 UW_{89}	—	November 23, 2011	Mount Lemmon	Mount Lemmon Survey	·	1.5 km	MPC · JPL
770039	2015 UU_{92}	—	October 16, 2015	Mount Lemmon	Mount Lemmon Survey	·	1.1 km	MPC · JPL
770040	2015 UT_{94}	—	October 23, 2015	Haleakala	Pan-STARRS 1	·	1.4 km	MPC · JPL
770041	2015 UQ_{99}	—	October 18, 2015	Haleakala	Pan-STARRS 1	·	1.1 km	MPC · JPL
770042	2015 UR_{99}	—	October 23, 2015	Haleakala	Pan-STARRS 1	·	1.1 km	MPC · JPL
770043	2015 UA_{103}	—	October 16, 2015	Mount Lemmon	Mount Lemmon Survey	·	1.2 km	MPC · JPL
770044	2015 UG_{103}	—	October 23, 2015	Mount Lemmon	Mount Lemmon Survey	·	890 m	MPC · JPL
770045	2015 UF_{104}	—	October 19, 2015	Haleakala	Pan-STARRS 1	·	1.9 km	MPC · JPL
770046	2015 VO_{3}	—	November 1, 2015	Mount Lemmon	Mount Lemmon Survey	·	1.4 km	MPC · JPL
770047	2015 VE_{9}	—	March 15, 2013	Mount Lemmon	Mount Lemmon Survey	HOF	1.7 km	MPC · JPL
770048	2015 VW_{9}	—	September 10, 2015	Haleakala	Pan-STARRS 1	KOR	1.0 km	MPC · JPL
770049	2015 VX_{14}	—	February 14, 2013	Haleakala	Pan-STARRS 1	·	1.3 km	MPC · JPL
770050	2015 VE_{16}	—	August 27, 2006	Kitt Peak	Spacewatch	·	1.5 km	MPC · JPL
770051	2015 VY_{16}	—	December 4, 2010	Piszkés-tető	K. Sárneczky, Z. Kuli	·	2.0 km	MPC · JPL
770052	2015 VS_{18}	—	October 13, 2015	Mount Lemmon	Mount Lemmon Survey	·	1.5 km	MPC · JPL
770053	2015 VJ_{21}	—	October 21, 2006	Mount Lemmon	Mount Lemmon Survey	·	1.2 km	MPC · JPL
770054	2015 VD_{23}	—	September 12, 2015	Haleakala	Pan-STARRS 1	·	1 km	MPC · JPL
770055	2015 VV_{24}	—	November 1, 2015	Mount Lemmon	Mount Lemmon Survey	MAR	990 m	MPC · JPL
770056	2015 VR_{25}	—	September 29, 2010	Mount Lemmon	Mount Lemmon Survey	·	1.3 km	MPC · JPL
770057	2015 VA_{30}	—	November 6, 2010	Mount Lemmon	Mount Lemmon Survey	·	2.4 km	MPC · JPL
770058	2015 VJ_{31}	—	October 16, 2015	Kitt Peak	Spacewatch	GEF	830 m	MPC · JPL
770059	2015 VM_{31}	—	October 3, 2015	Mount Lemmon	Mount Lemmon Survey	HNS	900 m	MPC · JPL
770060	2015 VD_{34}	—	November 26, 2005	Mount Lemmon	Mount Lemmon Survey	·	1.4 km	MPC · JPL
770061	2015 VR_{37}	—	February 13, 2008	Mount Lemmon	Mount Lemmon Survey	·	940 m	MPC · JPL
770062	2015 VU_{41}	—	October 21, 2015	Haleakala	Pan-STARRS 1	·	1.2 km	MPC · JPL
770063	2015 VY_{50}	—	July 25, 2015	Haleakala	Pan-STARRS 1	·	1.2 km	MPC · JPL
770064	2015 VJ_{53}	—	October 24, 2011	Haleakala	Pan-STARRS 1	MAR	780 m	MPC · JPL
770065	2015 VS_{53}	—	March 8, 2013	Haleakala	Pan-STARRS 1	·	1.5 km	MPC · JPL
770066	2015 VE_{55}	—	October 23, 2011	Haleakala	Pan-STARRS 1	·	1.2 km	MPC · JPL
770067	2015 VB_{56}	—	June 5, 2014	Haleakala	Pan-STARRS 1	·	1.1 km	MPC · JPL
770068	2015 VN_{68}	—	August 19, 2015	ISON-SSO	L. Elenin	·	1.3 km	MPC · JPL
770069	2015 VO_{69}	—	March 19, 2013	Haleakala	Pan-STARRS 1	·	1.4 km	MPC · JPL
770070	2015 VX_{70}	—	November 3, 2015	Mount Lemmon	Mount Lemmon Survey	·	1.7 km	MPC · JPL
770071	2015 VG_{72}	—	October 21, 2015	Haleakala	Pan-STARRS 1	·	990 m	MPC · JPL
770072	2015 VQ_{72}	—	October 8, 2015	Haleakala	Pan-STARRS 1	·	950 m	MPC · JPL
770073	2015 VW_{72}	—	November 18, 2011	Mount Lemmon	Mount Lemmon Survey	·	1.2 km	MPC · JPL
770074	2015 VM_{76}	—	September 5, 2008	Kitt Peak	Spacewatch	·	490 m	MPC · JPL
770075	2015 VJ_{77}	—	July 8, 2014	Haleakala	Pan-STARRS 1	·	1.7 km	MPC · JPL
770076	2015 VB_{79}	—	September 9, 2015	Haleakala	Pan-STARRS 1	·	1.1 km	MPC · JPL
770077	2015 VJ_{79}	—	October 12, 2015	Haleakala	Pan-STARRS 1	AGN	940 m	MPC · JPL
770078	2015 VR_{81}	—	September 9, 2015	Haleakala	Pan-STARRS 1	·	1.0 km	MPC · JPL
770079	2015 VQ_{83}	—	October 18, 2015	Haleakala	Pan-STARRS 1	·	1.4 km	MPC · JPL
770080	2015 VE_{87}	—	August 13, 2010	Kitt Peak	Spacewatch	·	1.4 km	MPC · JPL
770081	2015 VK_{89}	—	October 24, 2011	Haleakala	Pan-STARRS 1	MAR	800 m	MPC · JPL
770082	2015 VW_{93}	—	October 16, 2015	Kitt Peak	Spacewatch	·	1.0 km	MPC · JPL
770083	2015 VF_{94}	—	October 14, 2001	Socorro	LINEAR	·	1.3 km	MPC · JPL
770084	2015 VN_{96}	—	November 7, 2015	Haleakala	Pan-STARRS 1	·	1.1 km	MPC · JPL
770085	2015 VD_{97}	—	September 9, 2015	Haleakala	Pan-STARRS 1	·	1.9 km	MPC · JPL
770086	2015 VY_{100}	—	September 9, 2015	Haleakala	Pan-STARRS 1	·	1.2 km	MPC · JPL
770087	2015 VQ_{103}	—	October 9, 2015	Haleakala	Pan-STARRS 1	·	1.1 km	MPC · JPL
770088	2015 VC_{104}	—	October 2, 2006	Mount Lemmon	Mount Lemmon Survey	(12739)	1.2 km	MPC · JPL
770089	2015 VR_{106}	—	September 11, 2015	Haleakala	Pan-STARRS 1	·	1.2 km	MPC · JPL
770090	2015 VJ_{108}	—	November 27, 2011	Kitt Peak	Spacewatch	·	1.2 km	MPC · JPL
770091	2015 VL_{109}	—	April 18, 2009	Mount Lemmon	Mount Lemmon Survey	·	1.5 km	MPC · JPL
770092	2015 VM_{110}	—	October 16, 2015	XuYi	PMO NEO Survey Program	·	1.1 km	MPC · JPL
770093	2015 VD_{112}	—	October 10, 2015	Haleakala	Pan-STARRS 1	·	1.2 km	MPC · JPL
770094	2015 VR_{112}	—	October 3, 2002	Campo Imperatore	CINEOS	·	1.2 km	MPC · JPL
770095	2015 VB_{113}	—	May 21, 2014	Haleakala	Pan-STARRS 1	·	1.2 km	MPC · JPL
770096	2015 VV_{114}	—	September 28, 2006	Kitt Peak	Spacewatch	·	1.3 km	MPC · JPL
770097	2015 VZ_{120}	—	December 10, 2002	Socorro	LINEAR	·	1.3 km	MPC · JPL
770098	2015 VL_{121}	—	May 6, 2014	Haleakala	Pan-STARRS 1	·	1.4 km	MPC · JPL
770099	2015 VL_{123}	—	November 7, 2015	Mount Lemmon	Mount Lemmon Survey	·	1.1 km	MPC · JPL
770100	2015 VE_{124}	—	October 16, 2015	Mount Lemmon	Mount Lemmon Survey	·	2.0 km	MPC · JPL

== 770101–770200 ==
back to top

Designation			Discovery			Properties		Ref
Permanent	Provisional	Named after	Date	Site	Discoverer(s)	Category	Diam.	Ref
770101	2015 VW_{125}	—	September 10, 2015	Haleakala	Pan-STARRS 1	·	1.3 km	MPC · JPL
770102	2015 VT_{128}	—	November 2, 2015	Haleakala	Pan-STARRS 1	·	1.1 km	MPC · JPL
770103	2015 VH_{131}	—	November 18, 2011	Mount Lemmon	Mount Lemmon Survey	·	1.2 km	MPC · JPL
770104	2015 VF_{132}	—	December 6, 2011	Haleakala	Pan-STARRS 1	EUN	1.0 km	MPC · JPL
770105	2015 VK_{136}	—	November 3, 2015	Mount Lemmon	Mount Lemmon Survey	·	1.3 km	MPC · JPL
770106	2015 VR_{139}	—	February 2, 2008	Kitt Peak	Spacewatch	·	1.1 km	MPC · JPL
770107	2015 VY_{139}	—	November 7, 2015	Haleakala	Pan-STARRS 1	·	1.5 km	MPC · JPL
770108	2015 VM_{146}	—	July 25, 2014	Haleakala	Pan-STARRS 1	·	2.1 km	MPC · JPL
770109	2015 VL_{147}	—	August 3, 2014	Haleakala	Pan-STARRS 1	·	2.1 km	MPC · JPL
770110	2015 VU_{153}	—	September 24, 2015	Mount Lemmon	Mount Lemmon Survey	ADE	1.4 km	MPC · JPL
770111	2015 VV_{153}	—	November 19, 2006	Kitt Peak	Spacewatch	·	1.4 km	MPC · JPL
770112	2015 VC_{154}	—	November 3, 2015	Mount Lemmon	Mount Lemmon Survey	·	1.1 km	MPC · JPL
770113	2015 VL_{154}	—	November 7, 2015	Mount Lemmon	Mount Lemmon Survey	·	1.2 km	MPC · JPL
770114	2015 VQ_{154}	—	November 7, 2015	Haleakala	Pan-STARRS 1	·	2.1 km	MPC · JPL
770115	2015 VF_{155}	—	November 14, 2015	Mount Lemmon	Mount Lemmon Survey	·	1.6 km	MPC · JPL
770116	2015 VZ_{155}	—	January 19, 2012	Haleakala	Pan-STARRS 1	·	1.1 km	MPC · JPL
770117	2015 VP_{156}	—	October 19, 2011	Mount Lemmon	Mount Lemmon Survey	MAR	670 m	MPC · JPL
770118	2015 VU_{156}	—	November 7, 2015	Mount Lemmon	Mount Lemmon Survey	·	960 m	MPC · JPL
770119	2015 VY_{156}	—	November 12, 2015	Mount Lemmon	Mount Lemmon Survey	·	1.1 km	MPC · JPL
770120	2015 VX_{157}	—	November 3, 2015	Mount Lemmon	Mount Lemmon Survey	·	1.1 km	MPC · JPL
770121	2015 VA_{158}	—	March 31, 2008	Kitt Peak	Spacewatch	·	1.2 km	MPC · JPL
770122	2015 VU_{158}	—	September 17, 2006	Kitt Peak	Spacewatch	·	1.3 km	MPC · JPL
770123	2015 VS_{159}	—	October 26, 2011	Haleakala	Pan-STARRS 1	EUN	850 m	MPC · JPL
770124	2015 VU_{159}	—	November 3, 2015	Mount Lemmon	Mount Lemmon Survey	·	2.3 km	MPC · JPL
770125	2015 VC_{160}	—	January 19, 2012	Kitt Peak	Spacewatch	·	1.4 km	MPC · JPL
770126	2015 VF_{160}	—	October 19, 2010	Mount Lemmon	Mount Lemmon Survey	·	1.3 km	MPC · JPL
770127	2015 VM_{160}	—	November 7, 2015	ESA OGS	ESA OGS	·	1.0 km	MPC · JPL
770128	2015 VZ_{160}	—	February 9, 2008	Kitt Peak	Spacewatch	·	1.4 km	MPC · JPL
770129	2015 VP_{161}	—	November 7, 2015	Mount Lemmon	Mount Lemmon Survey	·	1.3 km	MPC · JPL
770130	2015 VR_{161}	—	November 7, 2015	Mount Lemmon	Mount Lemmon Survey	·	550 m	MPC · JPL
770131	2015 VU_{161}	—	January 26, 2012	Haleakala	Pan-STARRS 1	MRX	580 m	MPC · JPL
770132	2015 VJ_{162}	—	July 28, 2014	Haleakala	Pan-STARRS 1	AGN	940 m	MPC · JPL
770133	2015 VL_{163}	—	November 16, 2006	Kitt Peak	Spacewatch	·	1.2 km	MPC · JPL
770134	2015 VZ_{173}	—	April 14, 2008	Mount Lemmon	Mount Lemmon Survey	·	1.2 km	MPC · JPL
770135	2015 VO_{174}	—	November 14, 2015	Mount Lemmon	Mount Lemmon Survey	·	1.4 km	MPC · JPL
770136	2015 VT_{174}	—	November 3, 2015	Mount Lemmon	Mount Lemmon Survey	MAR	780 m	MPC · JPL
770137	2015 VJ_{175}	—	November 2, 2015	Mount Lemmon	Mount Lemmon Survey	·	1.1 km	MPC · JPL
770138	2015 VH_{178}	—	November 2, 2015	Mount Lemmon	Mount Lemmon Survey	·	1.3 km	MPC · JPL
770139	2015 VZ_{179}	—	November 14, 2015	Mount Lemmon	Mount Lemmon Survey	·	1.3 km	MPC · JPL
770140	2015 VB_{185}	—	November 2, 2015	Haleakala	Pan-STARRS 1	·	1.8 km	MPC · JPL
770141	2015 VC_{185}	—	November 3, 2015	Mount Lemmon	Mount Lemmon Survey	·	1.2 km	MPC · JPL
770142	2015 VD_{185}	—	November 7, 2015	Mount Lemmon	Mount Lemmon Survey	·	1.2 km	MPC · JPL
770143	2015 VJ_{185}	—	November 10, 2015	Mount Lemmon	Mount Lemmon Survey	·	1.2 km	MPC · JPL
770144	2015 VY_{186}	—	November 6, 2015	Haleakala	Pan-STARRS 1	·	610 m	MPC · JPL
770145	2015 VG_{190}	—	November 2, 2015	Haleakala	Pan-STARRS 1	·	1.4 km	MPC · JPL
770146	2015 VG_{192}	—	November 13, 2015	Mount Lemmon	Mount Lemmon Survey	·	1.2 km	MPC · JPL
770147	2015 VN_{201}	—	November 12, 2015	Mount Lemmon	Mount Lemmon Survey	·	1.4 km	MPC · JPL
770148	2015 VH_{205}	—	November 9, 2015	Mount Lemmon	Mount Lemmon Survey	AGN	860 m	MPC · JPL
770149	2015 VX_{211}	—	September 23, 2015	Haleakala	Pan-STARRS 1	·	1.3 km	MPC · JPL
770150	2015 VH_{212}	—	November 1, 2015	Haleakala	Pan-STARRS 1	·	1.3 km	MPC · JPL
770151	2015 VP_{225}	—	November 14, 2015	Mount Lemmon	Mount Lemmon Survey	·	1.4 km	MPC · JPL
770152	2015 WV_{2}	—	July 20, 2004	Siding Spring	SSS	T_{j} (2.96) · EUP	3.8 km	MPC · JPL
770153	2015 WB_{7}	—	November 12, 2015	Mount Lemmon	Mount Lemmon Survey	·	1.3 km	MPC · JPL
770154	2015 WC_{7}	—	August 20, 2014	Haleakala	Pan-STARRS 1	EOS	1.3 km	MPC · JPL
770155	2015 WS_{10}	—	December 24, 2011	Mount Lemmon	Mount Lemmon Survey	·	1.7 km	MPC · JPL
770156	2015 WT_{13}	—	February 2, 2008	Mount Lemmon	Mount Lemmon Survey	·	1.2 km	MPC · JPL
770157	2015 WN_{18}	—	April 6, 2008	Mount Lemmon	Mount Lemmon Survey	·	1.2 km	MPC · JPL
770158	2015 WR_{18}	—	July 12, 2013	Haleakala	Pan-STARRS 1	·	3.2 km	MPC · JPL
770159	2015 WQ_{20}	—	February 3, 2012	Mount Lemmon	Mount Lemmon Survey	·	1.1 km	MPC · JPL
770160	2015 WV_{21}	—	July 1, 2014	Haleakala	Pan-STARRS 1	·	1.2 km	MPC · JPL
770161	2015 WG_{23}	—	November 20, 2015	Mount Lemmon	Mount Lemmon Survey	EUP	2.8 km	MPC · JPL
770162	2015 WL_{24}	—	October 24, 2015	Mount Lemmon	Mount Lemmon Survey	·	950 m	MPC · JPL
770163	2015 WD_{28}	—	November 18, 2015	Haleakala	Pan-STARRS 1	·	1.1 km	MPC · JPL
770164	2015 WK_{28}	—	November 22, 2015	Mount Lemmon	Mount Lemmon Survey	·	1.3 km	MPC · JPL
770165	2015 WN_{28}	—	November 17, 2015	Haleakala	Pan-STARRS 1	·	890 m	MPC · JPL
770166	2015 WS_{28}	—	November 21, 2015	Mount Lemmon	Mount Lemmon Survey	·	1.3 km	MPC · JPL
770167	2015 WG_{29}	—	November 22, 2015	Mount Lemmon	Mount Lemmon Survey	·	1.1 km	MPC · JPL
770168	2015 WV_{29}	—	November 22, 2015	Mount Lemmon	Mount Lemmon Survey	VER	2.0 km	MPC · JPL
770169	2015 WQ_{32}	—	November 18, 2015	Kitt Peak	Spacewatch	·	1.4 km	MPC · JPL
770170	2015 XJ_{4}	—	May 30, 2006	Mount Lemmon	Mount Lemmon Survey	·	1.2 km	MPC · JPL
770171	2015 XO_{4}	—	January 26, 2012	Mount Lemmon	Mount Lemmon Survey	·	1.5 km	MPC · JPL
770172	2015 XD_{5}	—	January 19, 2012	Kitt Peak	Spacewatch	·	1.2 km	MPC · JPL
770173	2015 XX_{7}	—	November 17, 2006	Mount Lemmon	Mount Lemmon Survey	·	1.3 km	MPC · JPL
770174	2015 XS_{9}	—	September 1, 2010	Mount Lemmon	Mount Lemmon Survey	·	1.1 km	MPC · JPL
770175 Flueras	2015 XC_{10}	Flueras	August 22, 2015	La Palma	EURONEAR	·	1.4 km	MPC · JPL
770176	2015 XR_{12}	—	December 6, 2011	Haleakala	Pan-STARRS 1	·	1.7 km	MPC · JPL
770177	2015 XT_{12}	—	September 23, 2015	Haleakala	Pan-STARRS 1	·	1.6 km	MPC · JPL
770178	2015 XQ_{13}	—	October 10, 2015	Haleakala	Pan-STARRS 1	·	1.2 km	MPC · JPL
770179	2015 XX_{14}	—	December 31, 2011	Kitt Peak	Spacewatch	·	1.1 km	MPC · JPL
770180	2015 XK_{15}	—	November 7, 2015	Haleakala	Pan-STARRS 1	·	940 m	MPC · JPL
770181	2015 XE_{16}	—	October 22, 2006	Kitt Peak	Spacewatch	·	1.4 km	MPC · JPL
770182	2015 XJ_{18}	—	October 8, 2015	Haleakala	Pan-STARRS 1	·	1.2 km	MPC · JPL
770183	2015 XF_{20}	—	November 16, 2006	Mount Lemmon	Mount Lemmon Survey	GEF	1.0 km	MPC · JPL
770184	2015 XX_{28}	—	October 8, 2015	Haleakala	Pan-STARRS 1	·	930 m	MPC · JPL
770185	2015 XL_{29}	—	October 8, 2015	Haleakala	Pan-STARRS 1	·	1.2 km	MPC · JPL
770186	2015 XC_{30}	—	November 13, 2015	Kitt Peak	Spacewatch	HNS	840 m	MPC · JPL
770187	2015 XF_{30}	—	January 26, 2012	Mount Lemmon	Mount Lemmon Survey	HOF	1.9 km	MPC · JPL
770188	2015 XM_{33}	—	November 1, 2015	Kitt Peak	Spacewatch	·	1.3 km	MPC · JPL
770189	2015 XS_{33}	—	June 18, 2014	Haleakala	Pan-STARRS 1	·	1.7 km	MPC · JPL
770190	2015 XD_{34}	—	November 17, 2006	Mount Lemmon	Mount Lemmon Survey	GEF	890 m	MPC · JPL
770191	2015 XM_{36}	—	June 27, 2014	Haleakala	Pan-STARRS 1	·	1.5 km	MPC · JPL
770192	2015 XC_{38}	—	September 1, 2010	Mount Lemmon	Mount Lemmon Survey	·	1.2 km	MPC · JPL
770193	2015 XQ_{38}	—	December 2, 2015	Haleakala	Pan-STARRS 1	HOF	1.9 km	MPC · JPL
770194	2015 XC_{39}	—	December 2, 2015	Haleakala	Pan-STARRS 1	·	1.4 km	MPC · JPL
770195	2015 XA_{41}	—	May 12, 2013	Haleakala	Pan-STARRS 1	·	2.2 km	MPC · JPL
770196	2015 XL_{44}	—	November 18, 2015	Haleakala	Pan-STARRS 1	·	1.0 km	MPC · JPL
770197	2015 XX_{45}	—	October 9, 2015	Haleakala	Pan-STARRS 1	·	1.4 km	MPC · JPL
770198	2015 XH_{48}	—	January 4, 2012	Kitt Peak	Spacewatch	·	1.1 km	MPC · JPL
770199	2015 XO_{50}	—	November 17, 2015	Haleakala	Pan-STARRS 1	·	1.5 km	MPC · JPL
770200	2015 XQ_{54}	—	October 10, 2015	Haleakala	Pan-STARRS 1	·	390 m	MPC · JPL

== 770201–770300 ==
back to top

Designation			Discovery			Properties		Ref
Permanent	Provisional	Named after	Date	Site	Discoverer(s)	Category	Diam.	Ref
770201	2015 XR_{56}	—	September 16, 2010	Mount Lemmon	Mount Lemmon Survey	·	1.4 km	MPC · JPL
770202	2015 XV_{61}	—	May 7, 2014	Haleakala	Pan-STARRS 1	·	1.4 km	MPC · JPL
770203	2015 XR_{65}	—	October 19, 2006	Catalina	CSS	EUN	1.0 km	MPC · JPL
770204	2015 XF_{67}	—	June 4, 2014	Haleakala	Pan-STARRS 1	·	1.2 km	MPC · JPL
770205	2015 XR_{70}	—	October 15, 2015	Haleakala	Pan-STARRS 1	·	1.9 km	MPC · JPL
770206	2015 XU_{70}	—	November 27, 2011	Mount Lemmon	Mount Lemmon Survey	·	1.3 km	MPC · JPL
770207	2015 XY_{70}	—	October 23, 2006	Kitt Peak	Spacewatch	·	1.4 km	MPC · JPL
770208	2015 XA_{71}	—	October 10, 2015	Haleakala	Pan-STARRS 1	·	1.2 km	MPC · JPL
770209	2015 XP_{72}	—	August 22, 2014	Haleakala	Pan-STARRS 1	EOS	1.3 km	MPC · JPL
770210	2015 XQ_{81}	—	January 19, 2012	Mount Lemmon	Mount Lemmon Survey	HNS	760 m	MPC · JPL
770211	2015 XJ_{85}	—	July 1, 2014	Haleakala	Pan-STARRS 1	·	1.6 km	MPC · JPL
770212	2015 XO_{85}	—	April 3, 2008	Mount Lemmon	Mount Lemmon Survey	·	1.2 km	MPC · JPL
770213	2015 XS_{88}	—	June 18, 2010	Mount Lemmon	Mount Lemmon Survey	·	1.5 km	MPC · JPL
770214	2015 XT_{89}	—	December 4, 2015	Haleakala	Pan-STARRS 1	·	1.2 km	MPC · JPL
770215	2015 XT_{90}	—	December 4, 2015	Haleakala	Pan-STARRS 1	·	1.4 km	MPC · JPL
770216	2015 XU_{90}	—	December 4, 2015	Haleakala	Pan-STARRS 1	·	1.0 km	MPC · JPL
770217	2015 XG_{93}	—	September 17, 2010	Mount Lemmon	Mount Lemmon Survey	·	1.2 km	MPC · JPL
770218	2015 XB_{94}	—	October 8, 2015	Haleakala	Pan-STARRS 1	·	1.1 km	MPC · JPL
770219	2015 XA_{98}	—	November 11, 2006	Catalina	CSS	·	1.3 km	MPC · JPL
770220	2015 XF_{100}	—	December 4, 2015	Haleakala	Pan-STARRS 1	·	950 m	MPC · JPL
770221	2015 XX_{102}	—	March 31, 2008	Mount Lemmon	Mount Lemmon Survey	·	1.3 km	MPC · JPL
770222	2015 XH_{106}	—	November 23, 2006	Mount Lemmon	Mount Lemmon Survey	·	1.2 km	MPC · JPL
770223	2015 XO_{106}	—	December 27, 2011	Kitt Peak	Spacewatch	·	1.3 km	MPC · JPL
770224	2015 XX_{107}	—	January 18, 2012	Mount Lemmon	Mount Lemmon Survey	·	1.4 km	MPC · JPL
770225	2015 XS_{109}	—	June 27, 2014	Haleakala	Pan-STARRS 1	·	1.4 km	MPC · JPL
770226	2015 XZ_{109}	—	December 4, 2015	Haleakala	Pan-STARRS 1	·	1.2 km	MPC · JPL
770227	2015 XH_{110}	—	February 23, 2012	Mount Lemmon	Mount Lemmon Survey	·	1.3 km	MPC · JPL
770228	2015 XW_{113}	—	April 12, 2013	Haleakala	Pan-STARRS 1	·	1.4 km	MPC · JPL
770229	2015 XZ_{116}	—	August 10, 2005	Cerro Tololo	Deep Ecliptic Survey	·	1.1 km	MPC · JPL
770230	2015 XN_{118}	—	August 6, 2014	Haleakala	Pan-STARRS 1	(21885)	1.9 km	MPC · JPL
770231	2015 XG_{119}	—	December 4, 2015	Haleakala	Pan-STARRS 1	·	1.5 km	MPC · JPL
770232	2015 XH_{119}	—	December 4, 2015	Haleakala	Pan-STARRS 1	·	1.6 km	MPC · JPL
770233	2015 XS_{119}	—	October 19, 2015	Haleakala	Pan-STARRS 1	·	1.3 km	MPC · JPL
770234	2015 XG_{120}	—	January 4, 2012	Mount Lemmon	Mount Lemmon Survey	HNS	730 m	MPC · JPL
770235	2015 XJ_{120}	—	April 28, 2009	Mount Lemmon	Mount Lemmon Survey	·	1.2 km	MPC · JPL
770236	2015 XN_{127}	—	September 16, 2010	Kitt Peak	Spacewatch	EUN	900 m	MPC · JPL
770237	2015 XA_{128}	—	December 4, 2015	Haleakala	Pan-STARRS 1	JUN	670 m	MPC · JPL
770238	2015 XM_{131}	—	September 17, 2009	La Sagra	OAM	·	2.3 km	MPC · JPL
770239	2015 XF_{132}	—	November 22, 2015	Mount Lemmon	Mount Lemmon Survey	·	1.1 km	MPC · JPL
770240	2015 XR_{134}	—	August 3, 2014	Haleakala	Pan-STARRS 1	·	1.2 km	MPC · JPL
770241	2015 XF_{135}	—	September 23, 2015	Haleakala	Pan-STARRS 1	·	1.9 km	MPC · JPL
770242	2015 XT_{135}	—	November 14, 2006	Mount Lemmon	Mount Lemmon Survey	·	1.3 km	MPC · JPL
770243	2015 XC_{137}	—	January 18, 2012	Mount Lemmon	Mount Lemmon Survey	·	1.4 km	MPC · JPL
770244	2015 XQ_{138}	—	November 9, 2015	Mount Lemmon	Mount Lemmon Survey	MAR	930 m	MPC · JPL
770245	2015 XM_{141}	—	September 18, 2010	Kitt Peak	Spacewatch	AGN	890 m	MPC · JPL
770246	2015 XM_{142}	—	February 4, 2006	Mount Lemmon	Mount Lemmon Survey	·	1.5 km	MPC · JPL
770247	2015 XU_{143}	—	November 10, 2009	Mount Lemmon	Mount Lemmon Survey	·	2.2 km	MPC · JPL
770248	2015 XH_{144}	—	November 22, 2015	Mount Lemmon	Mount Lemmon Survey	·	960 m	MPC · JPL
770249	2015 XQ_{144}	—	June 24, 2014	Haleakala	Pan-STARRS 1	HNS	950 m	MPC · JPL
770250	2015 XJ_{146}	—	December 5, 2010	Kitt Peak	Spacewatch	·	1.8 km	MPC · JPL
770251	2015 XU_{151}	—	November 8, 2015	Mount Lemmon	Mount Lemmon Survey	·	1.2 km	MPC · JPL
770252	2015 XV_{151}	—	May 31, 2014	Haleakala	Pan-STARRS 1	·	3.2 km	MPC · JPL
770253	2015 XY_{153}	—	December 26, 2011	Mount Lemmon	Mount Lemmon Survey	HNS	900 m	MPC · JPL
770254	2015 XQ_{158}	—	December 5, 2015	Haleakala	Pan-STARRS 1	HNS	930 m	MPC · JPL
770255	2015 XE_{160}	—	December 28, 2011	Mount Lemmon	Mount Lemmon Survey	HNS	1.0 km	MPC · JPL
770256	2015 XJ_{161}	—	November 9, 2015	Mount Lemmon	Mount Lemmon Survey	·	1.0 km	MPC · JPL
770257	2015 XQ_{161}	—	September 9, 2015	Haleakala	Pan-STARRS 1	·	1.4 km	MPC · JPL
770258	2015 XU_{161}	—	November 28, 2011	Mount Lemmon	Mount Lemmon Survey	·	1.0 km	MPC · JPL
770259	2015 XU_{162}	—	December 18, 2007	Mount Lemmon	Mount Lemmon Survey	EUN	890 m	MPC · JPL
770260	2015 XZ_{162}	—	December 5, 2015	Haleakala	Pan-STARRS 1	·	1.3 km	MPC · JPL
770261	2015 XB_{164}	—	September 12, 2015	Haleakala	Pan-STARRS 1	EUN	730 m	MPC · JPL
770262	2015 XW_{164}	—	January 10, 2008	Kitt Peak	Spacewatch	·	1.4 km	MPC · JPL
770263	2015 XZ_{166}	—	December 5, 2015	Haleakala	Pan-STARRS 1	·	1.5 km	MPC · JPL
770264	2015 XL_{176}	—	November 13, 2015	Mount Lemmon	Mount Lemmon Survey	·	1.2 km	MPC · JPL
770265	2015 XZ_{178}	—	July 3, 2014	Haleakala	Pan-STARRS 1	·	1.4 km	MPC · JPL
770266	2015 XF_{181}	—	July 8, 2014	Haleakala	Pan-STARRS 1	·	1.6 km	MPC · JPL
770267	2015 XP_{183}	—	April 13, 2013	Haleakala	Pan-STARRS 1	·	1.6 km	MPC · JPL
770268	2015 XW_{184}	—	December 29, 2011	Kitt Peak	Spacewatch	·	1.3 km	MPC · JPL
770269	2015 XQ_{186}	—	December 1, 2015	Haleakala	Pan-STARRS 1	EUN	910 m	MPC · JPL
770270	2015 XX_{186}	—	June 28, 2014	Haleakala	Pan-STARRS 1	·	1.2 km	MPC · JPL
770271	2015 XL_{189}	—	April 30, 2014	Haleakala	Pan-STARRS 1	·	1.3 km	MPC · JPL
770272	2015 XA_{193}	—	November 19, 2015	Kitt Peak	Spacewatch	·	1.1 km	MPC · JPL
770273	2015 XZ_{193}	—	October 12, 2010	Kitt Peak	Spacewatch	·	1.3 km	MPC · JPL
770274	2015 XA_{195}	—	January 14, 2012	Mount Lemmon	Mount Lemmon Survey	·	1.3 km	MPC · JPL
770275	2015 XM_{195}	—	December 6, 2015	Mount Lemmon	Mount Lemmon Survey	·	1.0 km	MPC · JPL
770276	2015 XL_{198}	—	February 23, 2012	Mount Lemmon	Mount Lemmon Survey	·	1.6 km	MPC · JPL
770277	2015 XC_{199}	—	May 25, 2014	Haleakala	Pan-STARRS 1	BRG	1.3 km	MPC · JPL
770278	2015 XN_{199}	—	October 10, 2010	Palomar	Palomar Transient Factory	·	1.4 km	MPC · JPL
770279	2015 XD_{200}	—	December 6, 2015	Haleakala	Pan-STARRS 1	·	1.4 km	MPC · JPL
770280	2015 XP_{201}	—	February 7, 2008	Kitt Peak	Spacewatch	·	1.0 km	MPC · JPL
770281	2015 XF_{202}	—	November 16, 2006	Mount Lemmon	Mount Lemmon Survey	AEO	790 m	MPC · JPL
770282	2015 XK_{202}	—	July 2, 2014	Haleakala	Pan-STARRS 1	PAD	1.2 km	MPC · JPL
770283	2015 XP_{204}	—	October 14, 2001	Kitt Peak	Spacewatch	·	1.1 km	MPC · JPL
770284	2015 XT_{209}	—	June 30, 2014	Haleakala	Pan-STARRS 1	·	1.4 km	MPC · JPL
770285	2015 XD_{212}	—	August 20, 2014	Haleakala	Pan-STARRS 1	·	1.3 km	MPC · JPL
770286	2015 XH_{212}	—	October 17, 2010	Mount Lemmon	Mount Lemmon Survey	·	1.2 km	MPC · JPL
770287	2015 XM_{212}	—	November 20, 2006	Kitt Peak	Spacewatch	·	1.3 km	MPC · JPL
770288	2015 XW_{212}	—	January 3, 2009	Kitt Peak	Spacewatch	NYS	900 m	MPC · JPL
770289	2015 XA_{213}	—	December 3, 2015	Mount Lemmon	Mount Lemmon Survey	·	1.4 km	MPC · JPL
770290	2015 XD_{213}	—	November 22, 2015	Mount Lemmon	Mount Lemmon Survey	·	1.7 km	MPC · JPL
770291	2015 XT_{215}	—	December 3, 2015	Mount Lemmon	Mount Lemmon Survey	·	1.3 km	MPC · JPL
770292	2015 XX_{215}	—	November 22, 2015	Mount Lemmon	Mount Lemmon Survey	·	1.2 km	MPC · JPL
770293	2015 XO_{216}	—	November 18, 2006	Kitt Peak	Spacewatch	·	1.5 km	MPC · JPL
770294	2015 XB_{217}	—	November 22, 2015	Mount Lemmon	Mount Lemmon Survey	NEM	1.5 km	MPC · JPL
770295	2015 XQ_{217}	—	April 18, 2012	Kitt Peak	Spacewatch	·	2.5 km	MPC · JPL
770296	2015 XF_{220}	—	October 9, 2010	Kitt Peak	Spacewatch	·	1.4 km	MPC · JPL
770297	2015 XL_{220}	—	September 4, 2010	Kitt Peak	Spacewatch	·	1.2 km	MPC · JPL
770298	2015 XJ_{221}	—	December 6, 2015	Haleakala	Pan-STARRS 1	·	1.3 km	MPC · JPL
770299	2015 XK_{222}	—	October 12, 2010	Mount Lemmon	Mount Lemmon Survey	GEF	870 m	MPC · JPL
770300	2015 XQ_{223}	—	November 22, 2015	Mount Lemmon	Mount Lemmon Survey	·	1.5 km	MPC · JPL

== 770301–770400 ==
back to top

Designation			Discovery			Properties		Ref
Permanent	Provisional	Named after	Date	Site	Discoverer(s)	Category	Diam.	Ref
770301	2015 XV_{223}	—	November 22, 2015	Mount Lemmon	Mount Lemmon Survey	·	1.2 km	MPC · JPL
770302	2015 XO_{229}	—	January 27, 2012	Mount Lemmon	Mount Lemmon Survey	AGN	850 m	MPC · JPL
770303	2015 XB_{232}	—	March 13, 2013	Kitt Peak	Research and Education Collaborative Occultation Network	·	950 m	MPC · JPL
770304	2015 XM_{236}	—	December 6, 2015	Haleakala	Pan-STARRS 1	(7744)	1.0 km	MPC · JPL
770305	2015 XU_{240}	—	December 6, 2015	Haleakala	Pan-STARRS 1	·	1.0 km	MPC · JPL
770306	2015 XM_{242}	—	August 20, 2014	Haleakala	Pan-STARRS 1	·	1.4 km	MPC · JPL
770307	2015 XN_{246}	—	October 21, 2006	Mount Lemmon	Mount Lemmon Survey	·	1.6 km	MPC · JPL
770308	2015 XD_{248}	—	April 20, 2009	Kitt Peak	Spacewatch	·	1.5 km	MPC · JPL
770309	2015 XH_{248}	—	November 2, 2015	Haleakala	Pan-STARRS 1	MAR	720 m	MPC · JPL
770310	2015 XT_{250}	—	December 7, 2015	Haleakala	Pan-STARRS 1	MAR	970 m	MPC · JPL
770311	2015 XC_{252}	—	December 7, 2015	Haleakala	Pan-STARRS 1	·	1.7 km	MPC · JPL
770312	2015 XL_{255}	—	June 24, 2014	Kitt Peak	Spacewatch	BRA	1.0 km	MPC · JPL
770313	2015 XS_{257}	—	December 7, 2015	Haleakala	Pan-STARRS 1	·	2.1 km	MPC · JPL
770314	2015 XG_{265}	—	August 3, 2014	Haleakala	Pan-STARRS 1	HOF	1.9 km	MPC · JPL
770315	2015 XD_{266}	—	November 12, 2015	Mount Lemmon	Mount Lemmon Survey	·	1.8 km	MPC · JPL
770316	2015 XN_{266}	—	October 2, 2006	Mount Lemmon	Mount Lemmon Survey	·	1.1 km	MPC · JPL
770317	2015 XY_{266}	—	November 22, 2015	Mount Lemmon	Mount Lemmon Survey	·	1.2 km	MPC · JPL
770318	2015 XY_{268}	—	December 3, 2015	Mount Lemmon	Mount Lemmon Survey	·	1.9 km	MPC · JPL
770319	2015 XO_{270}	—	June 24, 2014	Haleakala	Pan-STARRS 1	·	1.7 km	MPC · JPL
770320	2015 XC_{274}	—	February 9, 2008	Mount Lemmon	Mount Lemmon Survey	·	1.2 km	MPC · JPL
770321	2015 XJ_{277}	—	April 12, 2013	Haleakala	Pan-STARRS 1	NEM	1.6 km	MPC · JPL
770322	2015 XX_{277}	—	July 25, 2014	Haleakala	Pan-STARRS 1	·	1.3 km	MPC · JPL
770323	2015 XF_{279}	—	April 12, 2013	Haleakala	Pan-STARRS 1	·	1.6 km	MPC · JPL
770324	2015 XK_{281}	—	June 9, 2008	Kitt Peak	Spacewatch	·	2.0 km	MPC · JPL
770325	2015 XU_{282}	—	April 16, 2013	Haleakala	Pan-STARRS 1	·	1.1 km	MPC · JPL
770326	2015 XP_{289}	—	May 3, 2008	Mount Lemmon	Mount Lemmon Survey	MRX	720 m	MPC · JPL
770327	2015 XJ_{290}	—	January 27, 2012	Mount Lemmon	Mount Lemmon Survey	AGN	830 m	MPC · JPL
770328	2015 XE_{296}	—	December 7, 2015	Haleakala	Pan-STARRS 1	·	1.1 km	MPC · JPL
770329	2015 XZ_{297}	—	October 11, 2010	Mount Lemmon	Mount Lemmon Survey	WIT	770 m	MPC · JPL
770330	2015 XU_{300}	—	September 19, 2015	Haleakala	Pan-STARRS 1	·	1.1 km	MPC · JPL
770331	2015 XC_{305}	—	April 10, 2013	Haleakala	Pan-STARRS 1	·	1.5 km	MPC · JPL
770332	2015 XH_{305}	—	March 21, 2013	Oukaïmeden	M. Ory	·	1.5 km	MPC · JPL
770333	2015 XJ_{306}	—	October 10, 2010	Kitt Peak	Spacewatch	AGN	760 m	MPC · JPL
770334	2015 XD_{309}	—	April 17, 2013	Cerro Tololo-DECam	DECam	·	1.3 km	MPC · JPL
770335	2015 XP_{309}	—	September 23, 2015	Haleakala	Pan-STARRS 1	MAR	860 m	MPC · JPL
770336	2015 XZ_{310}	—	December 24, 2011	Mount Lemmon	Mount Lemmon Survey	MAR	940 m	MPC · JPL
770337	2015 XG_{312}	—	November 8, 2015	Mount Teide	E. Schwab	·	2.4 km	MPC · JPL
770338	2015 XL_{312}	—	July 28, 2014	Haleakala	Pan-STARRS 1	·	1.1 km	MPC · JPL
770339	2015 XM_{312}	—	January 10, 2011	Mount Lemmon	Mount Lemmon Survey	EOS	1.5 km	MPC · JPL
770340	2015 XU_{312}	—	August 23, 2014	Haleakala	Pan-STARRS 1	·	1.5 km	MPC · JPL
770341	2015 XF_{316}	—	August 20, 2014	Haleakala	Pan-STARRS 1	·	1.4 km	MPC · JPL
770342	2015 XX_{324}	—	February 1, 2012	Mount Lemmon	Mount Lemmon Survey	·	1.4 km	MPC · JPL
770343	2015 XB_{326}	—	December 8, 2015	Mount Lemmon	Mount Lemmon Survey	·	1.3 km	MPC · JPL
770344	2015 XE_{326}	—	October 15, 2001	Kitt Peak	Spacewatch	·	1.3 km	MPC · JPL
770345	2015 XW_{326}	—	October 31, 2010	Mount Lemmon	Mount Lemmon Survey	AGN	940 m	MPC · JPL
770346	2015 XK_{328}	—	September 17, 2006	Kitt Peak	Spacewatch	3:2	4.2 km	MPC · JPL
770347	2015 XJ_{335}	—	May 20, 2014	Haleakala	Pan-STARRS 1	·	1.0 km	MPC · JPL
770348	2015 XU_{335}	—	December 8, 2015	Haleakala	Pan-STARRS 1	EUN	1.0 km	MPC · JPL
770349	2015 XO_{337}	—	December 8, 2015	Haleakala	Pan-STARRS 1	·	1.2 km	MPC · JPL
770350	2015 XA_{339}	—	December 8, 2015	Haleakala	Pan-STARRS 1	·	2.5 km	MPC · JPL
770351	2015 XB_{343}	—	October 17, 2010	Mount Lemmon	Mount Lemmon Survey	HOF	2.1 km	MPC · JPL
770352	2015 XU_{346}	—	August 28, 2014	Haleakala	Pan-STARRS 1	EOS	1.5 km	MPC · JPL
770353	2015 XZ_{347}	—	February 25, 2012	Mount Lemmon	Mount Lemmon Survey	AEO	800 m	MPC · JPL
770354	2015 XY_{350}	—	November 27, 2011	Kitt Peak	Spacewatch	·	1.4 km	MPC · JPL
770355	2015 XD_{353}	—	July 28, 2014	Haleakala	Pan-STARRS 1	HOF	2.0 km	MPC · JPL
770356	2015 XB_{360}	—	September 17, 2010	Mount Lemmon	Mount Lemmon Survey	·	1.4 km	MPC · JPL
770357	2015 XD_{369}	—	October 28, 2010	Mount Lemmon	Mount Lemmon Survey	·	1.4 km	MPC · JPL
770358	2015 XJ_{369}	—	February 1, 2012	Mount Lemmon	Mount Lemmon Survey	·	1.1 km	MPC · JPL
770359	2015 XA_{370}	—	October 10, 2010	Mount Lemmon	Mount Lemmon Survey	·	1.1 km	MPC · JPL
770360	2015 XD_{371}	—	August 22, 2014	Haleakala	Pan-STARRS 1	·	2.3 km	MPC · JPL
770361	2015 XJ_{371}	—	August 28, 2014	Haleakala	Pan-STARRS 1	·	2.5 km	MPC · JPL
770362	2015 XK_{375}	—	June 29, 2014	Haleakala	Pan-STARRS 1	·	1.4 km	MPC · JPL
770363	2015 XS_{375}	—	December 12, 2015	Haleakala	Pan-STARRS 1	JUN	660 m	MPC · JPL
770364	2015 XA_{376}	—	September 16, 2006	Catalina	CSS	·	1.1 km	MPC · JPL
770365	2015 XS_{380}	—	October 5, 2002	Apache Point	SDSS	·	1.0 km	MPC · JPL
770366	2015 XV_{381}	—	September 19, 2015	Haleakala	Pan-STARRS 1	·	2.5 km	MPC · JPL
770367	2015 XM_{390}	—	February 25, 2011	Mount Lemmon	Mount Lemmon Survey	TIR	2.3 km	MPC · JPL
770368	2015 XO_{390}	—	December 7, 2015	Haleakala	Pan-STARRS 1	·	1.3 km	MPC · JPL
770369	2015 XT_{390}	—	February 17, 2012	Westfield	International Astronomical Search Collaboration	·	1.3 km	MPC · JPL
770370	2015 XV_{390}	—	April 2, 2011	Haleakala	Pan-STARRS 1	T_{j} (2.99)	2.6 km	MPC · JPL
770371	2015 XL_{391}	—	December 8, 2015	Haleakala	Pan-STARRS 1	·	1.6 km	MPC · JPL
770372	2015 XM_{391}	—	May 7, 2014	Haleakala	Pan-STARRS 1	HNS	1.1 km	MPC · JPL
770373	2015 XN_{391}	—	August 28, 2014	Haleakala	Pan-STARRS 1	·	2.0 km	MPC · JPL
770374	2015 XQ_{391}	—	December 9, 2015	Haleakala	Pan-STARRS 1	·	1.2 km	MPC · JPL
770375	2015 XJ_{392}	—	October 13, 2014	Mount Lemmon	Mount Lemmon Survey	·	2.0 km	MPC · JPL
770376	2015 XG_{393}	—	October 27, 2005	Mount Lemmon	Mount Lemmon Survey	·	1.5 km	MPC · JPL
770377	2015 XF_{395}	—	December 29, 2005	Mount Lemmon	Mount Lemmon Survey	·	1.2 km	MPC · JPL
770378	2015 XC_{397}	—	December 8, 2015	Haleakala	Pan-STARRS 1	·	1.5 km	MPC · JPL
770379	2015 XR_{397}	—	December 30, 2007	Kitt Peak	Spacewatch	·	1.2 km	MPC · JPL
770380	2015 XC_{399}	—	September 17, 2014	Haleakala	Pan-STARRS 1	·	1.3 km	MPC · JPL
770381	2015 XD_{399}	—	December 14, 2015	Haleakala	Pan-STARRS 1	PAD	1.2 km	MPC · JPL
770382	2015 XF_{400}	—	December 13, 2015	Haleakala	Pan-STARRS 1	EOS	1.5 km	MPC · JPL
770383	2015 XC_{401}	—	December 13, 2015	Haleakala	Pan-STARRS 1	·	940 m	MPC · JPL
770384	2015 XN_{401}	—	November 16, 2009	Kitt Peak	Spacewatch	·	2.1 km	MPC · JPL
770385	2015 XR_{401}	—	December 7, 2015	Haleakala	Pan-STARRS 1	·	1.7 km	MPC · JPL
770386	2015 XV_{404}	—	October 17, 2010	Mount Lemmon	Mount Lemmon Survey	·	1.3 km	MPC · JPL
770387	2015 XC_{405}	—	December 3, 2015	Mount Lemmon	Mount Lemmon Survey	·	1.4 km	MPC · JPL
770388	2015 XT_{408}	—	April 1, 2012	Haleakala	Pan-STARRS 1	·	1.4 km	MPC · JPL
770389	2015 XA_{409}	—	December 7, 2015	Haleakala	Pan-STARRS 1	·	2.2 km	MPC · JPL
770390	2015 XB_{409}	—	December 7, 2015	Haleakala	Pan-STARRS 1	·	1.0 km	MPC · JPL
770391	2015 XO_{410}	—	October 8, 2015	Haleakala	Pan-STARRS 1	EUN	850 m	MPC · JPL
770392	2015 XY_{411}	—	December 8, 2015	Haleakala	Pan-STARRS 1	·	1.4 km	MPC · JPL
770393	2015 XB_{413}	—	September 25, 2014	Kitt Peak	Spacewatch	·	1.5 km	MPC · JPL
770394	2015 XJ_{413}	—	September 18, 2010	Mount Lemmon	Mount Lemmon Survey	·	1.3 km	MPC · JPL
770395	2015 XC_{414}	—	February 23, 2012	Catalina	CSS	·	1.4 km	MPC · JPL
770396	2015 XO_{414}	—	November 22, 2014	Haleakala	Pan-STARRS 1	·	2.0 km	MPC · JPL
770397	2015 XB_{416}	—	December 9, 2015	Haleakala	Pan-STARRS 1	·	1.6 km	MPC · JPL
770398	2015 XE_{416}	—	January 28, 2011	Mount Lemmon	Mount Lemmon Survey	EOS	1.3 km	MPC · JPL
770399	2015 XK_{417}	—	October 3, 2014	Mount Lemmon	Mount Lemmon Survey	·	1.6 km	MPC · JPL
770400	2015 XZ_{417}	—	October 28, 2014	Haleakala	Pan-STARRS 1	·	1.6 km	MPC · JPL

== 770401–770500 ==
back to top

Designation			Discovery			Properties		Ref
Permanent	Provisional	Named after	Date	Site	Discoverer(s)	Category	Diam.	Ref
770401	2015 XF_{418}	—	November 17, 2014	Haleakala	Pan-STARRS 1	·	2.1 km	MPC · JPL
770402	2015 XS_{418}	—	August 30, 2014	Mount Lemmon	Mount Lemmon Survey	·	1.9 km	MPC · JPL
770403	2015 XX_{418}	—	November 17, 2014	Haleakala	Pan-STARRS 1	·	1.8 km	MPC · JPL
770404	2015 XS_{420}	—	December 14, 2015	Haleakala	Pan-STARRS 1	AEO	820 m	MPC · JPL
770405	2015 XU_{424}	—	December 9, 2015	Haleakala	Pan-STARRS 1	·	1.3 km	MPC · JPL
770406	2015 XE_{425}	—	December 9, 2015	Haleakala	Pan-STARRS 1	·	2.3 km	MPC · JPL
770407	2015 XG_{425}	—	December 12, 2015	Haleakala	Pan-STARRS 1	·	1.4 km	MPC · JPL
770408	2015 XQ_{428}	—	September 20, 2006	Kitt Peak	Spacewatch	·	1.1 km	MPC · JPL
770409	2015 XX_{428}	—	December 5, 2015	Haleakala	Pan-STARRS 1	·	1.2 km	MPC · JPL
770410	2015 XT_{430}	—	December 8, 2015	Haleakala	Pan-STARRS 1	·	1.1 km	MPC · JPL
770411	2015 XB_{431}	—	October 11, 2015	Mount Lemmon	Mount Lemmon Survey	·	1.2 km	MPC · JPL
770412	2015 XH_{431}	—	December 9, 2015	Haleakala	Pan-STARRS 1	·	1.1 km	MPC · JPL
770413	2015 XJ_{432}	—	December 10, 2015	Mount Lemmon	Mount Lemmon Survey	·	1.7 km	MPC · JPL
770414	2015 XV_{440}	—	December 9, 2015	Haleakala	Pan-STARRS 1	HOF	1.8 km	MPC · JPL
770415	2015 XC_{442}	—	December 4, 2015	Haleakala	Pan-STARRS 1	·	1.4 km	MPC · JPL
770416	2015 XU_{442}	—	December 8, 2015	Haleakala	Pan-STARRS 1	·	1.1 km	MPC · JPL
770417	2015 XB_{444}	—	December 14, 2015	Haleakala	Pan-STARRS 1	·	1.3 km	MPC · JPL
770418	2015 XR_{444}	—	December 7, 2015	Haleakala	Pan-STARRS 1	·	1.6 km	MPC · JPL
770419	2015 XR_{445}	—	December 14, 2015	Haleakala	Pan-STARRS 1	HNS	1.1 km	MPC · JPL
770420	2015 XW_{446}	—	December 8, 2015	Haleakala	Pan-STARRS 1	L5	6.8 km	MPC · JPL
770421	2015 XH_{447}	—	December 8, 2015	Mount Lemmon	Mount Lemmon Survey	·	1.2 km	MPC · JPL
770422	2015 XU_{447}	—	December 14, 2015	Haleakala	Pan-STARRS 1	MRX	700 m	MPC · JPL
770423	2015 XZ_{448}	—	December 13, 2015	Haleakala	Pan-STARRS 1	·	1.5 km	MPC · JPL
770424	2015 XJ_{452}	—	December 9, 2015	Haleakala	Pan-STARRS 1	·	2.4 km	MPC · JPL
770425	2015 XY_{458}	—	December 13, 2015	Haleakala	Pan-STARRS 1	GEF	790 m	MPC · JPL
770426	2015 XV_{460}	—	December 14, 2015	Mount Lemmon	Mount Lemmon Survey	·	2.4 km	MPC · JPL
770427	2015 XY_{464}	—	November 8, 2015	Mount Lemmon	Mount Lemmon Survey	HNS	920 m	MPC · JPL
770428	2015 XA_{470}	—	December 14, 2015	Mount Lemmon	Mount Lemmon Survey	·	1.1 km	MPC · JPL
770429	2015 XE_{475}	—	October 26, 2014	Mount Lemmon	Mount Lemmon Survey	L5	7.8 km	MPC · JPL
770430	2015 XZ_{476}	—	November 1, 2014	Mount Lemmon	Mount Lemmon Survey	MRX	820 m	MPC · JPL
770431	2015 XD_{477}	—	December 8, 2015	Haleakala	Pan-STARRS 1	·	1.5 km	MPC · JPL
770432	2015 XD_{481}	—	December 13, 2015	Haleakala	Pan-STARRS 1	·	1.3 km	MPC · JPL
770433	2015 XF_{483}	—	December 13, 2015	Haleakala	Pan-STARRS 1	·	1.8 km	MPC · JPL
770434	2015 XP_{490}	—	December 13, 2015	Haleakala	Pan-STARRS 1	·	2.2 km	MPC · JPL
770435	2015 XR_{494}	—	November 19, 2014	Haleakala	Pan-STARRS 1	·	1.6 km	MPC · JPL
770436	2015 XJ_{499}	—	December 3, 2015	Mount Lemmon	Mount Lemmon Survey	·	1.7 km	MPC · JPL
770437	2015 YF_{5}	—	December 17, 2015	Mount Lemmon	Mount Lemmon Survey	·	1.3 km	MPC · JPL
770438	2015 YZ_{12}	—	October 19, 2015	Haleakala	Pan-STARRS 1	·	1.5 km	MPC · JPL
770439	2015 YF_{15}	—	March 4, 2011	Kitt Peak	Spacewatch	·	2.4 km	MPC · JPL
770440	2015 YM_{16}	—	December 31, 2015	Haleakala	Pan-STARRS 1	·	1.3 km	MPC · JPL
770441	2015 YP_{19}	—	November 6, 2015	Catalina	CSS	·	1.4 km	MPC · JPL
770442	2015 YY_{22}	—	December 30, 2015	Mount Lemmon	Mount Lemmon Survey	·	1.9 km	MPC · JPL
770443	2015 YP_{25}	—	March 5, 2011	Mount Lemmon	Mount Lemmon Survey	·	1.9 km	MPC · JPL
770444	2015 YU_{25}	—	July 13, 2013	Mount Lemmon	Mount Lemmon Survey	·	1.9 km	MPC · JPL
770445	2015 YV_{25}	—	November 3, 2010	Mount Lemmon	Mount Lemmon Survey	(12739)	1.4 km	MPC · JPL
770446	2015 YC_{26}	—	September 25, 2005	Kitt Peak	Spacewatch	·	1.2 km	MPC · JPL
770447	2015 YP_{26}	—	July 16, 2004	Cerro Tololo	Deep Ecliptic Survey	·	1.3 km	MPC · JPL
770448	2015 YR_{26}	—	November 26, 2011	Mount Lemmon	Mount Lemmon Survey	·	1.4 km	MPC · JPL
770449	2015 YT_{27}	—	December 31, 2015	Haleakala	Pan-STARRS 1	·	1.6 km	MPC · JPL
770450	2015 YV_{27}	—	December 31, 2015	Haleakala	Pan-STARRS 1	(7605)	2.7 km	MPC · JPL
770451	2015 YP_{28}	—	December 19, 2015	Mount Lemmon	Mount Lemmon Survey	·	1.4 km	MPC · JPL
770452	2015 YY_{28}	—	February 11, 2011	Mount Lemmon	Mount Lemmon Survey	·	1.9 km	MPC · JPL
770453	2015 YE_{30}	—	December 18, 2015	Kitt Peak	Spacewatch	·	1.3 km	MPC · JPL
770454	2015 YN_{34}	—	December 31, 2015	Haleakala	Pan-STARRS 1	·	2.4 km	MPC · JPL
770455	2015 YL_{36}	—	December 31, 2015	Haleakala	Pan-STARRS 1	L5	7.5 km	MPC · JPL
770456	2015 YD_{37}	—	December 16, 2015	Catalina	CSS	·	1.7 km	MPC · JPL
770457	2016 AF_{1}	—	January 1, 2016	Mount Lemmon	Mount Lemmon Survey	JUN	650 m	MPC · JPL
770458	2016 AB_{2}	—	January 1, 2016	Mount Lemmon	Mount Lemmon Survey	·	1.7 km	MPC · JPL
770459	2016 AT_{4}	—	May 15, 2013	Haleakala	Pan-STARRS 1	HNS	860 m	MPC · JPL
770460	2016 AM_{7}	—	January 2, 2016	Mount Lemmon	Mount Lemmon Survey	EUN	930 m	MPC · JPL
770461	2016 AT_{10}	—	October 30, 2010	Mount Lemmon	Mount Lemmon Survey	·	1.4 km	MPC · JPL
770462	2016 AW_{11}	—	November 12, 2015	Mount Lemmon	Mount Lemmon Survey	(18466)	1.7 km	MPC · JPL
770463	2016 AH_{12}	—	January 4, 2016	Haleakala	Pan-STARRS 1	·	1.2 km	MPC · JPL
770464	2016 AU_{12}	—	August 22, 2014	Haleakala	Pan-STARRS 1	HOF	1.7 km	MPC · JPL
770465	2016 AK_{17}	—	July 25, 2014	Haleakala	Pan-STARRS 1	·	1.4 km	MPC · JPL
770466	2016 AX_{18}	—	October 28, 2010	Mount Lemmon	Mount Lemmon Survey	·	1.2 km	MPC · JPL
770467	2016 AH_{19}	—	January 19, 2012	Haleakala	Pan-STARRS 1	·	1.4 km	MPC · JPL
770468	2016 AK_{20}	—	August 12, 2012	Kitt Peak	Spacewatch	L5	7.0 km	MPC · JPL
770469	2016 AO_{20}	—	September 20, 2014	Haleakala	Pan-STARRS 1	KOR	950 m	MPC · JPL
770470	2016 AM_{21}	—	October 1, 2014	Haleakala	Pan-STARRS 1	·	2.5 km	MPC · JPL
770471	2016 AV_{21}	—	January 3, 2016	Kitt Peak	Spacewatch	KOR	1.1 km	MPC · JPL
770472	2016 AA_{25}	—	July 18, 2013	Haleakala	Pan-STARRS 1	EOS	1.3 km	MPC · JPL
770473	2016 AT_{26}	—	November 9, 2013	Haleakala	Pan-STARRS 1	L5	6.2 km	MPC · JPL
770474	2016 AY_{28}	—	November 14, 2010	Mount Lemmon	Mount Lemmon Survey	DOR	1.5 km	MPC · JPL
770475	2016 AP_{29}	—	July 15, 2013	Haleakala	Pan-STARRS 1	JUN	860 m	MPC · JPL
770476	2016 AG_{30}	—	January 7, 2006	Mount Lemmon	Mount Lemmon Survey	·	1.4 km	MPC · JPL
770477	2016 AD_{31}	—	August 22, 2014	Haleakala	Pan-STARRS 1	·	1.2 km	MPC · JPL
770478	2016 AY_{33}	—	December 18, 2015	Mount Lemmon	Mount Lemmon Survey	·	1.3 km	MPC · JPL
770479	2016 AW_{35}	—	October 1, 2014	Haleakala	Pan-STARRS 1	EOS	1.4 km	MPC · JPL
770480	2016 AC_{36}	—	October 30, 2005	Mount Lemmon	Mount Lemmon Survey	·	1.7 km	MPC · JPL
770481	2016 AM_{37}	—	March 1, 2012	Mount Lemmon	Mount Lemmon Survey	AEO	850 m	MPC · JPL
770482	2016 AK_{38}	—	December 3, 2015	Mount Lemmon	Mount Lemmon Survey	·	2.4 km	MPC · JPL
770483	2016 AM_{40}	—	October 17, 2014	Mount Lemmon	Mount Lemmon Survey	·	2.4 km	MPC · JPL
770484	2016 AP_{43}	—	January 4, 2016	Haleakala	Pan-STARRS 1	·	1.5 km	MPC · JPL
770485	2016 AK_{44}	—	November 20, 2014	Haleakala	Pan-STARRS 1	L5	9.1 km	MPC · JPL
770486	2016 AN_{45}	—	April 15, 2012	Haleakala	Pan-STARRS 1	KOR	1.0 km	MPC · JPL
770487	2016 AX_{46}	—	December 18, 2015	Mount Lemmon	Mount Lemmon Survey	HOF	1.9 km	MPC · JPL
770488	2016 AR_{49}	—	August 28, 2014	Haleakala	Pan-STARRS 1	615	1.2 km	MPC · JPL
770489	2016 AQ_{50}	—	August 20, 2014	Haleakala	Pan-STARRS 1	·	1.4 km	MPC · JPL
770490	2016 AP_{51}	—	November 13, 2010	Mount Lemmon	Mount Lemmon Survey	·	1.3 km	MPC · JPL
770491	2016 AR_{51}	—	December 6, 2015	Mount Lemmon	Mount Lemmon Survey	·	1.6 km	MPC · JPL
770492	2016 AG_{53}	—	December 16, 2015	XuYi	PMO NEO Survey Program	GAL	1.6 km	MPC · JPL
770493	2016 AF_{54}	—	September 2, 2014	Haleakala	Pan-STARRS 1	·	1.2 km	MPC · JPL
770494	2016 AW_{56}	—	August 22, 2014	Haleakala	Pan-STARRS 1	NEM	1.6 km	MPC · JPL
770495	2016 AQ_{59}	—	November 2, 2010	Mount Lemmon	Mount Lemmon Survey	·	1.8 km	MPC · JPL
770496	2016 AF_{61}	—	September 3, 2014	Bergisch Gladbach	W. Bickel	·	2.3 km	MPC · JPL
770497	2016 AB_{63}	—	December 14, 2010	Mount Lemmon	Mount Lemmon Survey	EOS	1.4 km	MPC · JPL
770498	2016 AA_{64}	—	December 3, 2015	Mount Lemmon	Mount Lemmon Survey	·	1.3 km	MPC · JPL
770499	2016 AJ_{64}	—	January 4, 2016	Haleakala	Pan-STARRS 1	·	1.4 km	MPC · JPL
770500	2016 AT_{67}	—	October 19, 2010	Mount Lemmon	Mount Lemmon Survey	·	1.2 km	MPC · JPL

== 770501–770600 ==
back to top

Designation			Discovery			Properties		Ref
Permanent	Provisional	Named after	Date	Site	Discoverer(s)	Category	Diam.	Ref
770501	2016 AE_{71}	—	November 8, 2010	Mount Lemmon	Mount Lemmon Survey	·	1.4 km	MPC · JPL
770502	2016 AM_{73}	—	June 4, 2014	Haleakala	Pan-STARRS 1	·	1.7 km	MPC · JPL
770503	2016 AO_{73}	—	December 9, 2015	Haleakala	Pan-STARRS 1	·	1.3 km	MPC · JPL
770504	2016 AH_{76}	—	January 20, 2012	Haleakala	Pan-STARRS 1	EUN	1.2 km	MPC · JPL
770505	2016 AB_{79}	—	September 4, 2013	Mount Lemmon	Mount Lemmon Survey	·	2.2 km	MPC · JPL
770506	2016 AZ_{80}	—	July 5, 2014	Haleakala	Pan-STARRS 1	·	3.1 km	MPC · JPL
770507	2016 AN_{89}	—	October 12, 2010	Mount Lemmon	Mount Lemmon Survey	AGN	850 m	MPC · JPL
770508	2016 AD_{90}	—	September 29, 2010	Mount Lemmon	Mount Lemmon Survey	·	1.0 km	MPC · JPL
770509	2016 AY_{90}	—	December 2, 2005	Mount Lemmon	Mount Lemmon Survey	·	500 m	MPC · JPL
770510	2016 AM_{91}	—	October 24, 2015	Haleakala	Pan-STARRS 1	TIR	2.7 km	MPC · JPL
770511	2016 AP_{92}	—	October 10, 2015	Haleakala	Pan-STARRS 1	·	1.5 km	MPC · JPL
770512	2016 AX_{95}	—	March 9, 2011	Mount Lemmon	Mount Lemmon Survey	·	2.1 km	MPC · JPL
770513	2016 AW_{98}	—	December 11, 2010	Mount Lemmon	Mount Lemmon Survey	·	1.7 km	MPC · JPL
770514	2016 AL_{102}	—	January 7, 2016	Haleakala	Pan-STARRS 1	·	1.3 km	MPC · JPL
770515	2016 AE_{103}	—	November 27, 2006	Mount Lemmon	Mount Lemmon Survey	·	1.5 km	MPC · JPL
770516	2016 AU_{103}	—	January 7, 2016	Haleakala	Pan-STARRS 1	·	1.4 km	MPC · JPL
770517	2016 AV_{106}	—	October 5, 2014	Mount Lemmon	Mount Lemmon Survey	THM	1.7 km	MPC · JPL
770518	2016 AT_{111}	—	August 30, 2014	Haleakala	Pan-STARRS 1	·	2.4 km	MPC · JPL
770519	2016 AB_{112}	—	November 12, 2010	Kitt Peak	Spacewatch	·	1.3 km	MPC · JPL
770520	2016 AF_{112}	—	February 7, 2011	Mount Lemmon	Mount Lemmon Survey	·	1.3 km	MPC · JPL
770521	2016 AT_{113}	—	October 12, 2005	Kitt Peak	Spacewatch	·	540 m	MPC · JPL
770522	2016 AE_{118}	—	February 23, 2007	Mount Lemmon	Mount Lemmon Survey	·	1.3 km	MPC · JPL
770523	2016 AA_{119}	—	January 3, 2016	Mount Lemmon	Mount Lemmon Survey	·	1.8 km	MPC · JPL
770524	2016 AE_{119}	—	August 31, 2014	Haleakala	Pan-STARRS 1	·	1.9 km	MPC · JPL
770525	2016 AN_{119}	—	July 14, 2013	Haleakala	Pan-STARRS 1	·	1.6 km	MPC · JPL
770526	2016 AN_{121}	—	September 21, 2008	Mount Lemmon	Mount Lemmon Survey	·	2.1 km	MPC · JPL
770527	2016 AP_{121}	—	January 8, 2016	Haleakala	Pan-STARRS 1	·	2.3 km	MPC · JPL
770528	2016 AU_{122}	—	October 2, 2014	Haleakala	Pan-STARRS 1	·	2.6 km	MPC · JPL
770529	2016 AZ_{122}	—	January 8, 2016	Haleakala	Pan-STARRS 1	·	1.2 km	MPC · JPL
770530	2016 AH_{124}	—	January 8, 2016	Haleakala	Pan-STARRS 1	HNS	1.0 km	MPC · JPL
770531	2016 AC_{127}	—	January 8, 2016	Haleakala	Pan-STARRS 1	·	2.3 km	MPC · JPL
770532	2016 AV_{132}	—	August 20, 2014	Haleakala	Pan-STARRS 1	HNS	750 m	MPC · JPL
770533	2016 AW_{132}	—	January 9, 2016	Haleakala	Pan-STARRS 1	·	2.5 km	MPC · JPL
770534	2016 AF_{136}	—	October 30, 2010	Kitt Peak	Spacewatch	·	1.3 km	MPC · JPL
770535	2016 AH_{138}	—	January 30, 2011	Mount Lemmon	Mount Lemmon Survey	EOS	1.2 km	MPC · JPL
770536	2016 AO_{138}	—	October 21, 2014	Mount Lemmon	Mount Lemmon Survey	EOS	1.4 km	MPC · JPL
770537	2016 AF_{143}	—	August 27, 2014	Haleakala	Pan-STARRS 1	·	1.3 km	MPC · JPL
770538	2016 AZ_{143}	—	August 31, 2014	Mount Lemmon	Mount Lemmon Survey	·	1.4 km	MPC · JPL
770539	2016 AD_{144}	—	January 9, 2016	Haleakala	Pan-STARRS 1	·	1.4 km	MPC · JPL
770540	2016 AC_{145}	—	January 9, 2016	Haleakala	Pan-STARRS 1	·	2.5 km	MPC · JPL
770541	2016 AZ_{145}	—	March 5, 2006	Kitt Peak	Spacewatch	·	1.4 km	MPC · JPL
770542	2016 AC_{148}	—	March 24, 2012	Mount Lemmon	Mount Lemmon Survey	·	1.3 km	MPC · JPL
770543	2016 AO_{149}	—	December 12, 2015	Haleakala	Pan-STARRS 1	·	2.2 km	MPC · JPL
770544	2016 AZ_{150}	—	December 14, 2015	Haleakala	Pan-STARRS 1	TIR	1.9 km	MPC · JPL
770545	2016 AT_{154}	—	August 27, 2014	Haleakala	Pan-STARRS 1	BRA	1.0 km	MPC · JPL
770546	2016 AW_{154}	—	August 7, 2008	Kitt Peak	Spacewatch	·	2.1 km	MPC · JPL
770547	2016 AQ_{156}	—	January 11, 2016	Haleakala	Pan-STARRS 1	TIR	2.3 km	MPC · JPL
770548	2016 AD_{157}	—	November 9, 2014	Mount Lemmon	Mount Lemmon Survey	·	1.8 km	MPC · JPL
770549	2016 AP_{157}	—	April 15, 2012	Haleakala	Pan-STARRS 1	·	1.7 km	MPC · JPL
770550	2016 AF_{158}	—	January 11, 2016	Haleakala	Pan-STARRS 1	·	1.4 km	MPC · JPL
770551	2016 AM_{158}	—	March 8, 2008	Mount Lemmon	Mount Lemmon Survey	MAR	690 m	MPC · JPL
770552	2016 AZ_{158}	—	January 11, 2016	Haleakala	Pan-STARRS 1	·	1.5 km	MPC · JPL
770553	2016 AF_{159}	—	November 27, 2014	Haleakala	Pan-STARRS 1	·	2.0 km	MPC · JPL
770554	2016 AF_{162}	—	December 13, 2015	Haleakala	Pan-STARRS 1	·	2.3 km	MPC · JPL
770555	2016 AO_{163}	—	November 18, 2014	Haleakala	Pan-STARRS 1	·	2.2 km	MPC · JPL
770556	2016 AF_{164}	—	October 26, 2014	Mount Lemmon	Mount Lemmon Survey	·	2.0 km	MPC · JPL
770557	2016 AP_{166}	—	June 28, 2014	Haleakala	Pan-STARRS 1	(18466)	2.0 km	MPC · JPL
770558	2016 AO_{167}	—	October 21, 2014	Kitt Peak	Spacewatch	EOS	1.5 km	MPC · JPL
770559	2016 AS_{167}	—	October 1, 2014	Haleakala	Pan-STARRS 1	·	1.9 km	MPC · JPL
770560	2016 AQ_{169}	—	November 17, 2014	Mount Lemmon	Mount Lemmon Survey	·	2.1 km	MPC · JPL
770561	2016 AA_{173}	—	July 25, 2014	Haleakala	Pan-STARRS 1	·	1.5 km	MPC · JPL
770562	2016 AW_{173}	—	January 9, 2016	Haleakala	Pan-STARRS 1	·	1.5 km	MPC · JPL
770563	2016 AN_{178}	—	March 12, 2008	Kitt Peak	Spacewatch	KON	1.9 km	MPC · JPL
770564	2016 AN_{183}	—	August 30, 2013	Haleakala	Pan-STARRS 1	·	1.9 km	MPC · JPL
770565	2016 AB_{191}	—	January 13, 2016	Haleakala	Pan-STARRS 1	·	1.4 km	MPC · JPL
770566	2016 AN_{191}	—	January 13, 2016	Haleakala	Pan-STARRS 1	615	880 m	MPC · JPL
770567	2016 AS_{195}	—	January 4, 2016	Haleakala	Pan-STARRS 1	L5	7.3 km	MPC · JPL
770568	2016 AM_{201}	—	August 27, 2014	Haleakala	Pan-STARRS 1	·	1.2 km	MPC · JPL
770569	2016 AT_{201}	—	January 3, 2016	Haleakala	Pan-STARRS 1	·	1.2 km	MPC · JPL
770570	2016 AM_{202}	—	May 16, 2012	Mount Lemmon	Mount Lemmon Survey	·	2.0 km	MPC · JPL
770571	2016 AT_{203}	—	January 3, 2016	Mount Lemmon	Mount Lemmon Survey	·	1.6 km	MPC · JPL
770572	2016 AX_{203}	—	August 23, 2014	Haleakala	Pan-STARRS 1	·	2.1 km	MPC · JPL
770573	2016 AC_{204}	—	January 27, 2007	Kitt Peak	Spacewatch	·	1.5 km	MPC · JPL
770574	2016 AS_{205}	—	January 4, 2016	Haleakala	Pan-STARRS 1	HNS	1.2 km	MPC · JPL
770575	2016 AW_{207}	—	January 7, 2016	Haleakala	Pan-STARRS 1	·	1.2 km	MPC · JPL
770576	2016 AD_{208}	—	March 17, 2012	Kitt Peak	Spacewatch	·	1.2 km	MPC · JPL
770577	2016 AW_{209}	—	January 8, 2016	Haleakala	Pan-STARRS 1	·	2.6 km	MPC · JPL
770578	2016 AS_{210}	—	January 9, 2016	Haleakala	Pan-STARRS 1	·	1.6 km	MPC · JPL
770579	2016 AO_{213}	—	February 19, 2012	Kitt Peak	Spacewatch	·	1.7 km	MPC · JPL
770580	2016 AG_{215}	—	January 15, 2016	Haleakala	Pan-STARRS 1	·	1.3 km	MPC · JPL
770581	2016 AU_{215}	—	January 15, 2016	Haleakala	Pan-STARRS 1	·	2.5 km	MPC · JPL
770582	2016 AX_{216}	—	January 3, 2016	Haleakala	Pan-STARRS 1	·	1.9 km	MPC · JPL
770583	2016 AA_{218}	—	August 9, 2013	Haleakala	Pan-STARRS 1	·	2.4 km	MPC · JPL
770584	2016 AO_{218}	—	September 2, 2014	Haleakala	Pan-STARRS 1	EOS	1.4 km	MPC · JPL
770585	2016 AW_{220}	—	October 3, 2014	Kitt Peak	Spacewatch	·	1.4 km	MPC · JPL
770586	2016 AD_{221}	—	August 20, 2014	Haleakala	Pan-STARRS 1	·	1.5 km	MPC · JPL
770587	2016 AL_{230}	—	August 15, 2013	Haleakala	Pan-STARRS 1	·	1.4 km	MPC · JPL
770588	2016 AV_{230}	—	October 2, 2014	Mount Lemmon	Mount Lemmon Survey	KOR	1.1 km	MPC · JPL
770589	2016 AZ_{230}	—	January 3, 2016	Haleakala	Pan-STARRS 1	·	1.1 km	MPC · JPL
770590	2016 AF_{231}	—	October 16, 2009	Mount Lemmon	Mount Lemmon Survey	KOR	1.0 km	MPC · JPL
770591	2016 AQ_{231}	—	September 20, 2014	Haleakala	Pan-STARRS 1	KOR	1.1 km	MPC · JPL
770592	2016 AX_{231}	—	February 7, 2011	Mount Lemmon	Mount Lemmon Survey	·	1.5 km	MPC · JPL
770593	2016 AD_{233}	—	January 25, 2011	Mount Lemmon	Mount Lemmon Survey	·	1.7 km	MPC · JPL
770594	2016 AR_{233}	—	October 19, 2010	Mount Lemmon	Mount Lemmon Survey	·	1.2 km	MPC · JPL
770595	2016 AM_{234}	—	January 7, 2016	Haleakala	Pan-STARRS 1	·	1.8 km	MPC · JPL
770596	2016 AP_{234}	—	February 13, 2011	Mount Lemmon	Mount Lemmon Survey	·	1.3 km	MPC · JPL
770597	2016 AV_{234}	—	November 26, 2009	Mount Lemmon	Mount Lemmon Survey	·	1.9 km	MPC · JPL
770598	2016 AE_{235}	—	October 28, 2014	Haleakala	Pan-STARRS 1	·	1.5 km	MPC · JPL
770599	2016 AZ_{235}	—	June 18, 2013	Haleakala	Pan-STARRS 1	·	1.5 km	MPC · JPL
770600	2016 AH_{236}	—	February 6, 2002	Kitt Peak	Spacewatch	·	1.4 km	MPC · JPL

== 770601–770700 ==
back to top

Designation			Discovery			Properties		Ref
Permanent	Provisional	Named after	Date	Site	Discoverer(s)	Category	Diam.	Ref
770601	2016 AB_{237}	—	January 8, 2016	Haleakala	Pan-STARRS 1	·	1.6 km	MPC · JPL
770602	2016 AA_{238}	—	October 28, 2014	Haleakala	Pan-STARRS 1	·	2.1 km	MPC · JPL
770603	2016 AB_{238}	—	September 19, 2014	Haleakala	Pan-STARRS 1	·	1.4 km	MPC · JPL
770604	2016 AE_{238}	—	January 14, 2016	Haleakala	Pan-STARRS 1	·	1.6 km	MPC · JPL
770605	2016 AB_{239}	—	January 1, 2016	Haleakala	Pan-STARRS 1	·	1.0 km	MPC · JPL
770606	2016 AK_{240}	—	January 2, 2016	Haleakala	Pan-STARRS 1	·	1.4 km	MPC · JPL
770607	2016 AY_{240}	—	March 17, 2012	Mount Lemmon	Mount Lemmon Survey	·	1.3 km	MPC · JPL
770608	2016 AK_{241}	—	July 28, 2014	Haleakala	Pan-STARRS 1	DOR	1.6 km	MPC · JPL
770609	2016 AL_{241}	—	January 3, 2016	Haleakala	Pan-STARRS 1	·	2.8 km	MPC · JPL
770610	2016 AA_{242}	—	January 3, 2016	Haleakala	Pan-STARRS 1	KOR	1.1 km	MPC · JPL
770611	2016 AE_{245}	—	February 27, 2012	Haleakala	Pan-STARRS 1	·	1.4 km	MPC · JPL
770612	2016 AF_{245}	—	April 3, 2008	Mount Lemmon	Mount Lemmon Survey	·	1.5 km	MPC · JPL
770613	2016 AL_{245}	—	January 8, 2011	Mount Lemmon	Mount Lemmon Survey	·	1.7 km	MPC · JPL
770614	2016 AE_{246}	—	January 3, 2016	Haleakala	Pan-STARRS 1	·	1.4 km	MPC · JPL
770615	2016 AH_{246}	—	October 28, 2010	Mount Lemmon	Mount Lemmon Survey	·	1.3 km	MPC · JPL
770616	2016 AM_{247}	—	February 13, 2012	Haleakala	Pan-STARRS 1	·	1.3 km	MPC · JPL
770617	2016 AY_{247}	—	July 28, 2014	Haleakala	Pan-STARRS 1	·	1.5 km	MPC · JPL
770618	2016 AK_{249}	—	January 4, 2016	Haleakala	Pan-STARRS 1	·	2.3 km	MPC · JPL
770619	2016 AQ_{249}	—	September 19, 2014	Haleakala	Pan-STARRS 1	HOF	1.9 km	MPC · JPL
770620	2016 AP_{250}	—	January 4, 2016	Haleakala	Pan-STARRS 1	EOS	1.2 km	MPC · JPL
770621	2016 AU_{250}	—	January 26, 2012	Mount Lemmon	Mount Lemmon Survey	·	1.3 km	MPC · JPL
770622	2016 AX_{250}	—	October 1, 2014	Haleakala	Pan-STARRS 1	·	1.3 km	MPC · JPL
770623	2016 AD_{251}	—	January 4, 2016	Haleakala	Pan-STARRS 1	·	1.3 km	MPC · JPL
770624	2016 AE_{251}	—	March 24, 2012	Mount Lemmon	Mount Lemmon Survey	·	1.3 km	MPC · JPL
770625	2016 AD_{252}	—	August 23, 2014	Haleakala	Pan-STARRS 1	·	670 m	MPC · JPL
770626	2016 AG_{253}	—	January 4, 2016	Haleakala	Pan-STARRS 1	·	2.1 km	MPC · JPL
770627	2016 AD_{254}	—	January 7, 2016	Haleakala	Pan-STARRS 1	·	1.5 km	MPC · JPL
770628	2016 AN_{254}	—	January 7, 2016	Haleakala	Pan-STARRS 1	·	1.3 km	MPC · JPL
770629	2016 AQ_{255}	—	August 31, 2014	Haleakala	Pan-STARRS 1	·	1.3 km	MPC · JPL
770630	2016 AE_{257}	—	December 14, 2010	Mount Lemmon	Mount Lemmon Survey	·	1.3 km	MPC · JPL
770631	2016 AN_{257}	—	January 7, 2016	Haleakala	Pan-STARRS 1	GEF	870 m	MPC · JPL
770632	2016 AF_{258}	—	September 19, 2014	Haleakala	Pan-STARRS 1	AGN	840 m	MPC · JPL
770633	2016 AO_{258}	—	September 23, 2008	Mount Lemmon	Mount Lemmon Survey	THM	1.8 km	MPC · JPL
770634	2016 AS_{258}	—	March 15, 2012	Mount Lemmon	Mount Lemmon Survey	·	1.2 km	MPC · JPL
770635	2016 AX_{258}	—	March 4, 2005	Kitt Peak	Spacewatch	THM	2.1 km	MPC · JPL
770636	2016 AJ_{259}	—	July 14, 2013	Haleakala	Pan-STARRS 1	EOS	1.4 km	MPC · JPL
770637	2016 AU_{259}	—	January 8, 2016	Haleakala	Pan-STARRS 1	HOF	1.9 km	MPC · JPL
770638	2016 AV_{259}	—	May 18, 2012	Mount Lemmon	Mount Lemmon Survey	·	1.7 km	MPC · JPL
770639	2016 AS_{260}	—	March 4, 2012	Mount Lemmon	Mount Lemmon Survey	·	1.8 km	MPC · JPL
770640	2016 AL_{261}	—	September 23, 2008	Kitt Peak	Spacewatch	·	2.0 km	MPC · JPL
770641	2016 AU_{261}	—	January 8, 2016	Haleakala	Pan-STARRS 1	·	2.6 km	MPC · JPL
770642	2016 AT_{264}	—	January 30, 2011	Mount Lemmon	Mount Lemmon Survey	·	1.4 km	MPC · JPL
770643	2016 AU_{267}	—	May 12, 2012	Haleakala	Pan-STARRS 1	·	1.8 km	MPC · JPL
770644	2016 AX_{268}	—	November 24, 2014	Mount Lemmon	Mount Lemmon Survey	·	2.8 km	MPC · JPL
770645	2016 AC_{269}	—	September 3, 2008	Kitt Peak	Spacewatch	·	2.0 km	MPC · JPL
770646	2016 AM_{270}	—	March 29, 2012	Haleakala	Pan-STARRS 1	·	1.9 km	MPC · JPL
770647	2016 AP_{270}	—	January 13, 2016	Haleakala	Pan-STARRS 1	·	2.3 km	MPC · JPL
770648	2016 AC_{271}	—	April 2, 2011	Mount Lemmon	Mount Lemmon Survey	·	2.7 km	MPC · JPL
770649	2016 AK_{271}	—	September 14, 2013	Haleakala	Pan-STARRS 1	·	2.6 km	MPC · JPL
770650	2016 AC_{272}	—	April 13, 2012	Kitt Peak	Spacewatch	·	1.7 km	MPC · JPL
770651	2016 AK_{272}	—	January 14, 2016	Haleakala	Pan-STARRS 1	·	1.3 km	MPC · JPL
770652	2016 AB_{273}	—	January 14, 2016	Haleakala	Pan-STARRS 1	EOS	1.5 km	MPC · JPL
770653	2016 AX_{273}	—	December 15, 2009	Mount Lemmon	Mount Lemmon Survey	·	2.3 km	MPC · JPL
770654	2016 AG_{274}	—	April 27, 2012	Haleakala	Pan-STARRS 1	·	1.5 km	MPC · JPL
770655	2016 AQ_{275}	—	January 14, 2016	Haleakala	Pan-STARRS 1	EOS	1.3 km	MPC · JPL
770656	2016 AU_{275}	—	March 31, 2011	Haleakala	Pan-STARRS 1	·	2.0 km	MPC · JPL
770657	2016 AQ_{277}	—	January 15, 2016	Haleakala	Pan-STARRS 1	·	1.6 km	MPC · JPL
770658	2016 AG_{278}	—	January 4, 2016	Haleakala	Pan-STARRS 1	·	1.4 km	MPC · JPL
770659	2016 AS_{282}	—	January 3, 2011	Mount Lemmon	Mount Lemmon Survey	·	1.7 km	MPC · JPL
770660	2016 AO_{283}	—	April 25, 2006	Kitt Peak	Spacewatch	·	740 m	MPC · JPL
770661	2016 AY_{283}	—	January 2, 2016	Haleakala	Pan-STARRS 1	·	1.3 km	MPC · JPL
770662	2016 AC_{284}	—	January 8, 2016	Haleakala	Pan-STARRS 1	MRX	730 m	MPC · JPL
770663	2016 AP_{284}	—	January 3, 2016	Haleakala	Pan-STARRS 1	·	1.6 km	MPC · JPL
770664	2016 AP_{290}	—	January 3, 2016	Haleakala	Pan-STARRS 1	·	1.9 km	MPC · JPL
770665	2016 AS_{292}	—	January 4, 2016	Haleakala	Pan-STARRS 1	TIN	920 m	MPC · JPL
770666	2016 AD_{293}	—	January 14, 2016	Haleakala	Pan-STARRS 1	EOS	1.5 km	MPC · JPL
770667	2016 AJ_{299}	—	January 4, 2016	Haleakala	Pan-STARRS 1	·	1.6 km	MPC · JPL
770668	2016 AT_{301}	—	January 7, 2016	Haleakala	Pan-STARRS 1	·	1.4 km	MPC · JPL
770669	2016 AD_{302}	—	January 9, 2016	Haleakala	Pan-STARRS 1	EOS	1.4 km	MPC · JPL
770670	2016 AH_{302}	—	January 4, 2016	Haleakala	Pan-STARRS 1	·	1.4 km	MPC · JPL
770671	2016 AZ_{303}	—	January 3, 2016	Haleakala	Pan-STARRS 1	·	1.5 km	MPC · JPL
770672	2016 AP_{304}	—	January 12, 2016	Haleakala	Pan-STARRS 1	·	1.3 km	MPC · JPL
770673	2016 AG_{306}	—	January 14, 2016	Haleakala	Pan-STARRS 1	HNS	1.1 km	MPC · JPL
770674	2016 AJ_{306}	—	January 12, 2016	Haleakala	Pan-STARRS 1	·	1.4 km	MPC · JPL
770675	2016 AL_{306}	—	January 8, 2016	Haleakala	Pan-STARRS 1	·	1.3 km	MPC · JPL
770676	2016 AB_{307}	—	January 7, 2016	Haleakala	Pan-STARRS 1	·	1.2 km	MPC · JPL
770677	2016 AH_{307}	—	January 8, 2016	Haleakala	Pan-STARRS 1	·	1.6 km	MPC · JPL
770678	2016 AL_{307}	—	January 14, 2016	Haleakala	Pan-STARRS 1	NAE	1.7 km	MPC · JPL
770679	2016 AZ_{307}	—	January 3, 2016	Haleakala	Pan-STARRS 1	KOR	1.1 km	MPC · JPL
770680	2016 AS_{308}	—	January 11, 2016	Haleakala	Pan-STARRS 1	·	1.8 km	MPC · JPL
770681	2016 AU_{308}	—	January 7, 2016	Haleakala	Pan-STARRS 1	·	1.9 km	MPC · JPL
770682	2016 AG_{309}	—	January 14, 2016	Mount Lemmon	Mount Lemmon Survey	·	1.6 km	MPC · JPL
770683	2016 AH_{315}	—	January 11, 2016	Haleakala	Pan-STARRS 1	·	1.5 km	MPC · JPL
770684	2016 AJ_{315}	—	January 3, 2016	Haleakala	Pan-STARRS 1	·	560 m	MPC · JPL
770685	2016 AE_{323}	—	January 3, 2016	Mount Lemmon	Mount Lemmon Survey	·	1.3 km	MPC · JPL
770686	2016 AG_{323}	—	January 3, 2016	Mount Lemmon	Mount Lemmon Survey	·	1.5 km	MPC · JPL
770687	2016 AZ_{328}	—	January 13, 2016	Haleakala	Pan-STARRS 1	·	2.7 km	MPC · JPL
770688	2016 AP_{329}	—	November 10, 2013	Mount Lemmon	Mount Lemmon Survey	L5	7.7 km	MPC · JPL
770689	2016 AZ_{329}	—	January 14, 2016	Haleakala	Pan-STARRS 1	·	2.2 km	MPC · JPL
770690	2016 AJ_{330}	—	January 9, 2016	Haleakala	Pan-STARRS 1	BRA	1.2 km	MPC · JPL
770691	2016 AY_{336}	—	January 10, 2016	Haleakala	Pan-STARRS 1	·	1.7 km	MPC · JPL
770692	2016 AA_{337}	—	January 1, 2016	Mount Lemmon	Mount Lemmon Survey	·	2.0 km	MPC · JPL
770693	2016 AJ_{337}	—	January 4, 2016	Haleakala	Pan-STARRS 1	·	1.4 km	MPC · JPL
770694	2016 AU_{338}	—	January 3, 2016	Haleakala	Pan-STARRS 1	KOR	1.0 km	MPC · JPL
770695	2016 AH_{339}	—	January 14, 2016	Haleakala	Pan-STARRS 1	·	1.6 km	MPC · JPL
770696	2016 AF_{340}	—	January 12, 2016	Haleakala	Pan-STARRS 1	·	1.6 km	MPC · JPL
770697	2016 AW_{340}	—	January 2, 2016	Mount Lemmon	Mount Lemmon Survey	·	1.6 km	MPC · JPL
770698	2016 AM_{345}	—	January 4, 2016	Haleakala	Pan-STARRS 1	·	1.4 km	MPC · JPL
770699	2016 AT_{349}	—	January 13, 2016	Mount Lemmon	Mount Lemmon Survey	L5	6.6 km	MPC · JPL
770700	2016 AX_{355}	—	August 28, 2014	Haleakala	Pan-STARRS 1	·	1.1 km	MPC · JPL

== 770701–770800 ==
back to top

Designation			Discovery			Properties		Ref
Permanent	Provisional	Named after	Date	Site	Discoverer(s)	Category	Diam.	Ref
770701	2016 AH_{357}	—	November 24, 2014	Haleakala	Pan-STARRS 1	·	2.0 km	MPC · JPL
770702	2016 AF_{360}	—	January 9, 2016	Haleakala	Pan-STARRS 1	·	2.1 km	MPC · JPL
770703	2016 AD_{371}	—	January 14, 2016	Haleakala	Pan-STARRS 1	·	2.6 km	MPC · JPL
770704	2016 AH_{371}	—	January 14, 2016	Haleakala	Pan-STARRS 1	615	1.1 km	MPC · JPL
770705	2016 AV_{371}	—	January 4, 2016	Haleakala	Pan-STARRS 1	·	1.5 km	MPC · JPL
770706	2016 AK_{373}	—	January 14, 2016	Haleakala	Pan-STARRS 1	·	1.5 km	MPC · JPL
770707	2016 AM_{380}	—	January 9, 2016	Haleakala	Pan-STARRS 1	·	2.7 km	MPC · JPL
770708	2016 AA_{383}	—	January 14, 2016	Haleakala	Pan-STARRS 1	·	1.5 km	MPC · JPL
770709	2016 AD_{399}	—	January 7, 2016	Haleakala	Pan-STARRS 1	·	1.3 km	MPC · JPL
770710	2016 BD_{3}	—	January 18, 2016	Kitt Peak	Spacewatch	·	1.6 km	MPC · JPL
770711	2016 BJ_{3}	—	January 7, 2016	Haleakala	Pan-STARRS 1	JUN	740 m	MPC · JPL
770712	2016 BO_{3}	—	January 10, 2007	Kitt Peak	Spacewatch	·	1.5 km	MPC · JPL
770713	2016 BO_{11}	—	September 24, 2008	Mount Lemmon	Mount Lemmon Survey	TRE	2.5 km	MPC · JPL
770714	2016 BE_{13}	—	October 2, 2014	Catalina	CSS	·	1.6 km	MPC · JPL
770715	2016 BM_{16}	—	January 20, 2016	Mount Lemmon	Mount Lemmon Survey	·	1.9 km	MPC · JPL
770716	2016 BS_{17}	—	January 3, 2016	Haleakala	Pan-STARRS 1	TIR	2.2 km	MPC · JPL
770717	2016 BZ_{18}	—	December 11, 2010	Mount Lemmon	Mount Lemmon Survey	·	1.5 km	MPC · JPL
770718	2016 BW_{20}	—	February 7, 2011	Mount Lemmon	Mount Lemmon Survey	·	1.5 km	MPC · JPL
770719	2016 BR_{21}	—	January 7, 2016	Haleakala	Pan-STARRS 1	·	1.3 km	MPC · JPL
770720	2016 BC_{23}	—	January 7, 2016	XuYi	PMO NEO Survey Program	·	1.4 km	MPC · JPL
770721	2016 BM_{25}	—	January 10, 2007	Kitt Peak	Spacewatch	·	1.3 km	MPC · JPL
770722	2016 BX_{25}	—	December 18, 2015	Mount Lemmon	Mount Lemmon Survey	·	1.6 km	MPC · JPL
770723	2016 BU_{32}	—	October 1, 2005	Kitt Peak	Spacewatch	GEF	870 m	MPC · JPL
770724	2016 BS_{34}	—	January 7, 2016	Haleakala	Pan-STARRS 1	·	1.3 km	MPC · JPL
770725	2016 BW_{41}	—	February 25, 2011	Mount Lemmon	Mount Lemmon Survey	·	1.5 km	MPC · JPL
770726	2016 BD_{42}	—	May 12, 2013	Haleakala	Pan-STARRS 1	·	500 m	MPC · JPL
770727	2016 BM_{46}	—	September 30, 2014	Mount Lemmon	Mount Lemmon Survey	·	1.3 km	MPC · JPL
770728	2016 BM_{51}	—	November 17, 2009	Mount Lemmon	Mount Lemmon Survey	·	1.4 km	MPC · JPL
770729	2016 BP_{51}	—	September 18, 2014	Haleakala	Pan-STARRS 1	·	1.1 km	MPC · JPL
770730	2016 BG_{52}	—	December 9, 2015	Haleakala	Pan-STARRS 1	HNS	1.0 km	MPC · JPL
770731	2016 BX_{52}	—	August 30, 2014	Haleakala	Pan-STARRS 1	·	2.5 km	MPC · JPL
770732	2016 BY_{53}	—	October 1, 2014	Haleakala	Pan-STARRS 1	WIT	800 m	MPC · JPL
770733	2016 BB_{55}	—	October 27, 2005	Kitt Peak	Spacewatch	·	1.5 km	MPC · JPL
770734	2016 BJ_{57}	—	January 30, 2016	Mount Lemmon	Mount Lemmon Survey	·	2.1 km	MPC · JPL
770735	2016 BH_{63}	—	October 3, 2011	Mount Lemmon	Mount Lemmon Survey	·	410 m	MPC · JPL
770736	2016 BJ_{65}	—	January 14, 2011	Kitt Peak	Spacewatch	·	1.3 km	MPC · JPL
770737	2016 BZ_{66}	—	December 5, 2010	Mount Lemmon	Mount Lemmon Survey	·	1.4 km	MPC · JPL
770738	2016 BR_{68}	—	January 29, 2011	Mount Lemmon	Mount Lemmon Survey	·	1.3 km	MPC · JPL
770739	2016 BY_{68}	—	November 8, 2009	Mount Lemmon	Mount Lemmon Survey	·	1.7 km	MPC · JPL
770740	2016 BG_{76}	—	August 22, 2014	Haleakala	Pan-STARRS 1	·	2.3 km	MPC · JPL
770741	2016 BA_{77}	—	August 28, 2014	Haleakala	Pan-STARRS 1	·	1.4 km	MPC · JPL
770742	2016 BC_{79}	—	February 25, 2012	Kitt Peak	Spacewatch	MIS	2.0 km	MPC · JPL
770743	2016 BA_{85}	—	November 25, 2014	Mount Lemmon	Mount Lemmon Survey	·	1.6 km	MPC · JPL
770744	2016 BF_{85}	—	April 27, 2011	Kitt Peak	Spacewatch	·	2.1 km	MPC · JPL
770745	2016 BH_{86}	—	March 13, 2005	Mount Lemmon	Mount Lemmon Survey	·	2.4 km	MPC · JPL
770746	2016 BF_{89}	—	January 31, 2016	Haleakala	Pan-STARRS 1	·	1.9 km	MPC · JPL
770747	2016 BL_{90}	—	December 21, 2014	Haleakala	Pan-STARRS 1	EOS	1.5 km	MPC · JPL
770748	2016 BL_{92}	—	November 19, 2008	Mount Lemmon	Mount Lemmon Survey	·	2.4 km	MPC · JPL
770749	2016 BN_{92}	—	January 19, 2016	Haleakala	Pan-STARRS 1	EMA	2.4 km	MPC · JPL
770750	2016 BE_{93}	—	January 17, 2016	Haleakala	Pan-STARRS 1	·	1.5 km	MPC · JPL
770751	2016 BJ_{93}	—	January 18, 2016	Haleakala	Pan-STARRS 1	·	1.7 km	MPC · JPL
770752	2016 BN_{93}	—	September 29, 2014	Haleakala	Pan-STARRS 1	HOF	1.7 km	MPC · JPL
770753	2016 BR_{94}	—	January 16, 2016	Haleakala	Pan-STARRS 1	·	1.4 km	MPC · JPL
770754	2016 BR_{95}	—	April 4, 2011	Kitt Peak	Spacewatch	·	2.1 km	MPC · JPL
770755	2016 BT_{96}	—	August 28, 2014	Haleakala	Pan-STARRS 1	·	1.5 km	MPC · JPL
770756	2016 BT_{97}	—	March 13, 2007	Mount Lemmon	Mount Lemmon Survey	KOR	1.0 km	MPC · JPL
770757	2016 BU_{97}	—	January 17, 2016	Haleakala	Pan-STARRS 1	·	2.1 km	MPC · JPL
770758	2016 BA_{98}	—	August 27, 2013	Calar Alto	F. Hormuth	·	2.4 km	MPC · JPL
770759	2016 BL_{99}	—	November 1, 2013	Mount Lemmon	Mount Lemmon Survey	·	2.5 km	MPC · JPL
770760	2016 BY_{101}	—	March 6, 2011	Kitt Peak	Spacewatch	·	1.4 km	MPC · JPL
770761	2016 BY_{102}	—	November 17, 2014	Mount Lemmon	Mount Lemmon Survey	·	2.0 km	MPC · JPL
770762	2016 BB_{103}	—	October 5, 2014	Kitt Peak	Spacewatch	·	1.5 km	MPC · JPL
770763	2016 BK_{103}	—	November 1, 2008	Kitt Peak	Spacewatch	·	440 m	MPC · JPL
770764	2016 BQ_{103}	—	December 13, 2010	Mount Lemmon	Mount Lemmon Survey	·	1.4 km	MPC · JPL
770765	2016 BB_{105}	—	January 27, 2011	Mount Lemmon	Mount Lemmon Survey	KOR	1.1 km	MPC · JPL
770766	2016 BN_{105}	—	March 29, 2012	Haleakala	Pan-STARRS 1	·	1.6 km	MPC · JPL
770767	2016 BQ_{105}	—	September 20, 2014	Haleakala	Pan-STARRS 1	·	1.2 km	MPC · JPL
770768	2016 BG_{108}	—	October 30, 2005	Kitt Peak	Spacewatch	·	1.7 km	MPC · JPL
770769	2016 BE_{109}	—	January 17, 2016	Haleakala	Pan-STARRS 1	·	1.6 km	MPC · JPL
770770	2016 BP_{111}	—	January 29, 2016	Mount Lemmon	Mount Lemmon Survey	HOF	1.9 km	MPC · JPL
770771	2016 BT_{111}	—	January 16, 2016	Haleakala	Pan-STARRS 1	·	1.4 km	MPC · JPL
770772	2016 BZ_{112}	—	January 18, 2016	Haleakala	Pan-STARRS 1	·	1.6 km	MPC · JPL
770773	2016 BA_{113}	—	February 9, 2011	Mount Lemmon	Mount Lemmon Survey	·	1.4 km	MPC · JPL
770774	2016 BL_{113}	—	January 31, 2016	Haleakala	Pan-STARRS 1	·	1.5 km	MPC · JPL
770775	2016 BP_{115}	—	January 17, 2016	Haleakala	Pan-STARRS 1	·	2.1 km	MPC · JPL
770776	2016 BT_{116}	—	January 18, 2016	Haleakala	Pan-STARRS 1	·	2.5 km	MPC · JPL
770777	2016 BE_{118}	—	January 31, 2016	Haleakala	Pan-STARRS 1	·	1.4 km	MPC · JPL
770778	2016 BM_{118}	—	January 29, 2016	Mount Lemmon	Mount Lemmon Survey	·	1.5 km	MPC · JPL
770779	2016 BY_{118}	—	March 21, 2012	Catalina	CSS	JUN	780 m	MPC · JPL
770780	2016 BF_{119}	—	January 30, 2016	Haleakala	Pan-STARRS 1	·	1.5 km	MPC · JPL
770781	2016 BY_{122}	—	January 31, 2016	Haleakala	Pan-STARRS 1	·	1.4 km	MPC · JPL
770782	2016 BN_{123}	—	January 17, 2016	Haleakala	Pan-STARRS 1	·	2.1 km	MPC · JPL
770783	2016 BE_{124}	—	January 18, 2016	Haleakala	Pan-STARRS 1	·	1.9 km	MPC · JPL
770784	2016 BN_{124}	—	January 18, 2016	Haleakala	Pan-STARRS 1	·	1.8 km	MPC · JPL
770785	2016 BZ_{126}	—	January 31, 2016	Haleakala	Pan-STARRS 1	·	1.4 km	MPC · JPL
770786	2016 BM_{127}	—	January 31, 2016	Haleakala	Pan-STARRS 1	·	2.2 km	MPC · JPL
770787	2016 BC_{137}	—	January 16, 2016	Haleakala	Pan-STARRS 1	·	1.5 km	MPC · JPL
770788	2016 BJ_{143}	—	November 26, 2014	Haleakala	Pan-STARRS 1	EOS	1.3 km	MPC · JPL
770789	2016 BD_{146}	—	January 18, 2016	Haleakala	Pan-STARRS 1	·	1.6 km	MPC · JPL
770790	2016 BF_{146}	—	January 28, 2016	Mount Lemmon	Mount Lemmon Survey	·	1.3 km	MPC · JPL
770791	2016 CO_{4}	—	October 3, 2014	Mount Lemmon	Mount Lemmon Survey	·	1.7 km	MPC · JPL
770792	2016 CA_{6}	—	January 17, 2016	Haleakala	Pan-STARRS 1	·	1.4 km	MPC · JPL
770793	2016 CJ_{6}	—	August 12, 2013	Kitt Peak	Spacewatch	·	1.5 km	MPC · JPL
770794	2016 CJ_{8}	—	November 22, 2014	Haleakala	Pan-STARRS 1	VER	2.0 km	MPC · JPL
770795	2016 CY_{8}	—	November 22, 2014	Haleakala	Pan-STARRS 1	·	2.2 km	MPC · JPL
770796	2016 CW_{12}	—	April 1, 2011	Mount Lemmon	Mount Lemmon Survey	·	2.1 km	MPC · JPL
770797	2016 CM_{15}	—	February 1, 2016	Haleakala	Pan-STARRS 1	·	1.8 km	MPC · JPL
770798	2016 CV_{16}	—	January 14, 2011	Kitt Peak	Spacewatch	·	1.7 km	MPC · JPL
770799	2016 CJ_{17}	—	January 8, 2016	Haleakala	Pan-STARRS 1	·	1.9 km	MPC · JPL
770800	2016 CY_{25}	—	December 3, 2015	Haleakala	Pan-STARRS 1	·	1.1 km	MPC · JPL

== 770801–770900 ==
back to top

Designation			Discovery			Properties		Ref
Permanent	Provisional	Named after	Date	Site	Discoverer(s)	Category	Diam.	Ref
770801	2016 CE_{28}	—	April 25, 2007	Mount Lemmon	Mount Lemmon Survey	BRA	1.3 km	MPC · JPL
770802	2016 CJ_{33}	—	September 4, 2008	Kitt Peak	Spacewatch	·	2.2 km	MPC · JPL
770803	2016 CO_{34}	—	January 4, 2016	Haleakala	Pan-STARRS 1	·	1.8 km	MPC · JPL
770804	2016 CC_{35}	—	September 1, 2013	Mount Lemmon	Mount Lemmon Survey	·	1.6 km	MPC · JPL
770805	2016 CT_{35}	—	January 8, 2016	Haleakala	Pan-STARRS 1	·	1.4 km	MPC · JPL
770806	2016 CR_{36}	—	September 15, 2009	Kitt Peak	Spacewatch	KOR	990 m	MPC · JPL
770807	2016 CM_{38}	—	February 17, 2007	Kitt Peak	Spacewatch	·	1.3 km	MPC · JPL
770808	2016 CH_{42}	—	October 26, 2005	Kitt Peak	Spacewatch	·	1.4 km	MPC · JPL
770809	2016 CH_{44}	—	October 5, 2005	Mount Lemmon	Mount Lemmon Survey	AEO	940 m	MPC · JPL
770810	2016 CA_{46}	—	March 4, 2011	Mount Lemmon	Mount Lemmon Survey	·	1.9 km	MPC · JPL
770811	2016 CF_{46}	—	September 3, 2013	Haleakala	Pan-STARRS 1	EOS	1.2 km	MPC · JPL
770812	2016 CP_{46}	—	January 27, 2011	Mount Lemmon	Mount Lemmon Survey	·	1.4 km	MPC · JPL
770813	2016 CM_{48}	—	September 28, 2014	Haleakala	Pan-STARRS 1	·	1.5 km	MPC · JPL
770814	2016 CY_{49}	—	October 16, 2003	Kitt Peak	Spacewatch	·	1.6 km	MPC · JPL
770815	2016 CH_{50}	—	February 3, 2016	Haleakala	Pan-STARRS 1	NAE	1.8 km	MPC · JPL
770816	2016 CF_{51}	—	July 30, 2014	Haleakala	Pan-STARRS 1	·	470 m	MPC · JPL
770817	2016 CK_{52}	—	March 28, 2012	Mount Lemmon	Mount Lemmon Survey	MRX	810 m	MPC · JPL
770818	2016 CZ_{52}	—	October 28, 2014	Haleakala	Pan-STARRS 1	·	1.4 km	MPC · JPL
770819	2016 CL_{54}	—	April 19, 2012	Kitt Peak	Spacewatch	BRA	1.2 km	MPC · JPL
770820	2016 CF_{56}	—	December 21, 2015	Mount Lemmon	Mount Lemmon Survey	DOR	1.9 km	MPC · JPL
770821	2016 CJ_{56}	—	December 20, 2014	Haleakala	Pan-STARRS 1	·	2.0 km	MPC · JPL
770822	2016 CR_{60}	—	April 15, 2012	Haleakala	Pan-STARRS 1	·	1.6 km	MPC · JPL
770823	2016 CM_{62}	—	January 13, 2011	Mount Lemmon	Mount Lemmon Survey	HOF	1.8 km	MPC · JPL
770824	2016 CN_{64}	—	September 7, 2014	Haleakala	Pan-STARRS 1	·	620 m	MPC · JPL
770825	2016 CY_{64}	—	April 3, 2011	Haleakala	Pan-STARRS 1	·	2.2 km	MPC · JPL
770826	2016 CG_{66}	—	May 15, 2012	Haleakala	Pan-STARRS 1	·	1.6 km	MPC · JPL
770827	2016 CU_{74}	—	January 30, 2016	Haleakala	Pan-STARRS 1	·	1.7 km	MPC · JPL
770828	2016 CX_{74}	—	October 24, 2014	Kitt Peak	Spacewatch	·	2.5 km	MPC · JPL
770829	2016 CC_{77}	—	February 5, 2016	Haleakala	Pan-STARRS 1	EOS	1.4 km	MPC · JPL
770830	2016 CS_{81}	—	October 13, 2014	Mount Lemmon	Mount Lemmon Survey	·	1.5 km	MPC · JPL
770831	2016 CO_{83}	—	March 13, 2013	Haleakala	Pan-STARRS 1	·	610 m	MPC · JPL
770832	2016 CY_{86}	—	October 5, 2013	Mount Lemmon	Mount Lemmon Survey	EMA	2.3 km	MPC · JPL
770833	2016 CZ_{86}	—	February 27, 2006	Mount Lemmon	Mount Lemmon Survey	·	1.4 km	MPC · JPL
770834	2016 CT_{87}	—	November 9, 2008	Kitt Peak	Spacewatch	·	490 m	MPC · JPL
770835	2016 CG_{91}	—	September 1, 2013	Haleakala	Pan-STARRS 1	·	1.6 km	MPC · JPL
770836	2016 CU_{91}	—	November 17, 2014	Haleakala	Pan-STARRS 1	EOS	1.4 km	MPC · JPL
770837	2016 CV_{92}	—	February 5, 2016	Haleakala	Pan-STARRS 1	·	2.1 km	MPC · JPL
770838	2016 CD_{95}	—	February 5, 2016	Haleakala	Pan-STARRS 1	·	1.4 km	MPC · JPL
770839	2016 CB_{99}	—	November 14, 2010	Kitt Peak	Spacewatch	·	1.2 km	MPC · JPL
770840	2016 CV_{99}	—	February 5, 2016	Haleakala	Pan-STARRS 1	·	2.2 km	MPC · JPL
770841	2016 CG_{102}	—	December 10, 2014	Mount Lemmon	Mount Lemmon Survey	·	1.7 km	MPC · JPL
770842	2016 CL_{104}	—	July 12, 2013	Haleakala	Pan-STARRS 1	EOS	1.4 km	MPC · JPL
770843	2016 CP_{104}	—	April 18, 2012	Kitt Peak	Spacewatch	DOR	1.7 km	MPC · JPL
770844	2016 CO_{105}	—	November 25, 2014	Haleakala	Pan-STARRS 1	EOS	1.4 km	MPC · JPL
770845	2016 CP_{109}	—	August 15, 2013	Haleakala	Pan-STARRS 1	·	2.4 km	MPC · JPL
770846	2016 CW_{109}	—	September 2, 2014	Haleakala	Pan-STARRS 1	·	550 m	MPC · JPL
770847	2016 CD_{123}	—	October 30, 2014	Mount Lemmon	Mount Lemmon Survey	EOS	1.3 km	MPC · JPL
770848	2016 CM_{123}	—	January 27, 2012	Kitt Peak	Spacewatch	·	1.2 km	MPC · JPL
770849	2016 CJ_{124}	—	December 20, 2014	Haleakala	Pan-STARRS 1	EOS	1.5 km	MPC · JPL
770850	2016 CO_{127}	—	February 5, 2016	Haleakala	Pan-STARRS 1	·	1.3 km	MPC · JPL
770851	2016 CB_{133}	—	September 15, 2009	Kitt Peak	Spacewatch	·	1.4 km	MPC · JPL
770852	2016 CE_{133}	—	March 31, 2012	Mount Lemmon	Mount Lemmon Survey	·	1.6 km	MPC · JPL
770853	2016 CU_{133}	—	October 22, 2014	Mount Lemmon	Mount Lemmon Survey	·	1.4 km	MPC · JPL
770854	2016 CK_{134}	—	January 31, 2016	Haleakala	Pan-STARRS 1	·	1.4 km	MPC · JPL
770855	2016 CS_{134}	—	February 5, 2016	Haleakala	Pan-STARRS 1	·	1.3 km	MPC · JPL
770856	2016 CM_{135}	—	February 5, 2016	Haleakala	Pan-STARRS 1	·	1.2 km	MPC · JPL
770857	2016 CH_{143}	—	February 7, 2016	Mount Lemmon	Mount Lemmon Survey	·	500 m	MPC · JPL
770858	2016 CN_{144}	—	August 9, 2013	Haleakala	Pan-STARRS 1	EOS	1.4 km	MPC · JPL
770859	2016 CJ_{146}	—	February 8, 2016	Mount Lemmon	Mount Lemmon Survey	EOS	1.4 km	MPC · JPL
770860	2016 CM_{146}	—	February 2, 2016	Haleakala	Pan-STARRS 1	GEF	870 m	MPC · JPL
770861	2016 CC_{150}	—	April 13, 2013	Haleakala	Pan-STARRS 1	·	550 m	MPC · JPL
770862	2016 CW_{152}	—	February 7, 2011	Mount Lemmon	Mount Lemmon Survey	·	1.1 km	MPC · JPL
770863	2016 CD_{153}	—	November 22, 2014	Haleakala	Pan-STARRS 1	EOS	1.5 km	MPC · JPL
770864	2016 CQ_{157}	—	January 30, 2011	Haleakala	Pan-STARRS 1	·	2.1 km	MPC · JPL
770865	2016 CX_{159}	—	January 17, 2016	Haleakala	Pan-STARRS 1	·	1.4 km	MPC · JPL
770866	2016 CX_{161}	—	March 10, 2011	Kitt Peak	Spacewatch	THM	2.0 km	MPC · JPL
770867	2016 CM_{167}	—	February 9, 2005	Mount Lemmon	Mount Lemmon Survey	·	2.3 km	MPC · JPL
770868	2016 CC_{168}	—	January 7, 2016	Haleakala	Pan-STARRS 1	HOF	1.7 km	MPC · JPL
770869	2016 CD_{168}	—	November 26, 2009	Mount Lemmon	Mount Lemmon Survey	·	1.9 km	MPC · JPL
770870	2016 CG_{169}	—	June 1, 2012	Mount Lemmon	Mount Lemmon Survey	·	1.6 km	MPC · JPL
770871	2016 CM_{170}	—	January 10, 2007	Mount Lemmon	Mount Lemmon Survey	·	1.2 km	MPC · JPL
770872	2016 CR_{170}	—	January 7, 2016	Haleakala	Pan-STARRS 1	·	1.3 km	MPC · JPL
770873	2016 CS_{172}	—	January 30, 2016	Mount Lemmon	Mount Lemmon Survey	·	2.1 km	MPC · JPL
770874	2016 CZ_{172}	—	January 7, 2016	Haleakala	Pan-STARRS 1	THM	2.0 km	MPC · JPL
770875	2016 CJ_{174}	—	January 7, 2016	Haleakala	Pan-STARRS 1	HOF	2.0 km	MPC · JPL
770876	2016 CS_{176}	—	August 27, 2014	Haleakala	Pan-STARRS 1	BRA	1.0 km	MPC · JPL
770877	2016 CA_{177}	—	December 13, 2015	Haleakala	Pan-STARRS 1	·	1.4 km	MPC · JPL
770878	2016 CE_{179}	—	October 30, 2014	Mount Lemmon	Mount Lemmon Survey	·	1.6 km	MPC · JPL
770879	2016 CW_{179}	—	January 12, 2016	Haleakala	Pan-STARRS 1	·	1.8 km	MPC · JPL
770880	2016 CF_{181}	—	November 12, 2006	Mount Lemmon	Mount Lemmon Survey	·	1.1 km	MPC · JPL
770881	2016 CC_{183}	—	January 16, 2016	Haleakala	Pan-STARRS 1	·	2.1 km	MPC · JPL
770882	2016 CS_{186}	—	September 18, 2009	Kitt Peak	Spacewatch	·	1.5 km	MPC · JPL
770883	2016 CU_{186}	—	December 13, 2015	Haleakala	Pan-STARRS 1	·	2.3 km	MPC · JPL
770884	2016 CS_{187}	—	May 24, 2006	Mount Lemmon	Mount Lemmon Survey	VER	1.9 km	MPC · JPL
770885	2016 CJ_{196}	—	November 10, 2010	Kitt Peak	Spacewatch	·	1.3 km	MPC · JPL
770886	2016 CN_{196}	—	May 19, 2012	Mount Lemmon	Mount Lemmon Survey	DOR	1.7 km	MPC · JPL
770887	2016 CY_{197}	—	December 12, 2014	Haleakala	Pan-STARRS 1	EOS	1.4 km	MPC · JPL
770888	2016 CJ_{208}	—	February 9, 2016	Haleakala	Pan-STARRS 1	·	3.9 km	MPC · JPL
770889	2016 CG_{209}	—	November 26, 2014	Haleakala	Pan-STARRS 1	·	2.5 km	MPC · JPL
770890	2016 CG_{211}	—	August 4, 2013	Haleakala	Pan-STARRS 1	·	1.5 km	MPC · JPL
770891	2016 CU_{214}	—	September 2, 2013	Mount Lemmon	Mount Lemmon Survey	·	2.2 km	MPC · JPL
770892	2016 CX_{217}	—	February 8, 2016	Mount Lemmon	Mount Lemmon Survey	·	420 m	MPC · JPL
770893	2016 CY_{218}	—	November 17, 2014	Mount Lemmon	Mount Lemmon Survey	KOR	1.1 km	MPC · JPL
770894	2016 CD_{220}	—	August 27, 2014	Haleakala	Pan-STARRS 1	·	1.2 km	MPC · JPL
770895	2016 CH_{220}	—	August 23, 2014	Haleakala	Pan-STARRS 1	·	750 m	MPC · JPL
770896	2016 CP_{227}	—	February 10, 2016	Haleakala	Pan-STARRS 1	EOS	1.4 km	MPC · JPL
770897	2016 CJ_{231}	—	November 2, 2008	Mount Lemmon	Mount Lemmon Survey	·	2.4 km	MPC · JPL
770898	2016 CC_{232}	—	January 3, 2016	Haleakala	Pan-STARRS 1	·	1.8 km	MPC · JPL
770899	2016 CP_{236}	—	September 20, 2014	Haleakala	Pan-STARRS 1	·	2.0 km	MPC · JPL
770900	2016 CT_{236}	—	September 29, 2009	Kitt Peak	Spacewatch	·	1.7 km	MPC · JPL

== 770901–771000 ==
back to top

Designation			Discovery			Properties		Ref
Permanent	Provisional	Named after	Date	Site	Discoverer(s)	Category	Diam.	Ref
770901	2016 CK_{237}	—	October 29, 2014	Haleakala	Pan-STARRS 1	·	1.5 km	MPC · JPL
770902	2016 CN_{237}	—	January 13, 2011	Mount Lemmon	Mount Lemmon Survey	·	1.5 km	MPC · JPL
770903	2016 CJ_{241}	—	December 13, 2010	Mount Lemmon	Mount Lemmon Survey	·	1.5 km	MPC · JPL
770904	2016 CL_{243}	—	October 18, 2009	Mount Lemmon	Mount Lemmon Survey	·	1.9 km	MPC · JPL
770905	2016 CQ_{248}	—	January 10, 2011	Mount Lemmon	Mount Lemmon Survey	·	1.4 km	MPC · JPL
770906	2016 CS_{251}	—	January 30, 2016	Mount Lemmon	Mount Lemmon Survey	EOS	1.5 km	MPC · JPL
770907	2016 CT_{251}	—	August 9, 2013	Haleakala	Pan-STARRS 1	·	2.0 km	MPC · JPL
770908	2016 CZ_{251}	—	January 3, 2016	Mount Lemmon	Mount Lemmon Survey	·	1.4 km	MPC · JPL
770909	2016 CK_{252}	—	October 29, 2014	Kitt Peak	Spacewatch	·	1.4 km	MPC · JPL
770910	2016 CT_{253}	—	January 30, 2016	Haleakala	Pan-STARRS 1	·	1.8 km	MPC · JPL
770911	2016 CR_{254}	—	October 17, 2014	Mount Lemmon	Mount Lemmon Survey	·	1.5 km	MPC · JPL
770912	2016 CR_{255}	—	January 7, 2016	Haleakala	Pan-STARRS 1	GAL	1.4 km	MPC · JPL
770913	2016 CN_{257}	—	September 2, 2014	Haleakala	Pan-STARRS 1	·	1.5 km	MPC · JPL
770914	2016 CY_{257}	—	March 5, 2011	Mount Lemmon	Mount Lemmon Survey	·	1.7 km	MPC · JPL
770915	2016 CN_{272}	—	February 6, 2016	Haleakala	Pan-STARRS 1	EOS	1.5 km	MPC · JPL
770916	2016 CC_{273}	—	February 9, 2016	Mount Lemmon	Mount Lemmon Survey	BRA	1.2 km	MPC · JPL
770917	2016 CG_{273}	—	April 26, 2007	Mount Lemmon	Mount Lemmon Survey	·	1.3 km	MPC · JPL
770918	2016 CF_{276}	—	February 11, 2016	Haleakala	Pan-STARRS 1	EOS	1.4 km	MPC · JPL
770919	2016 CJ_{276}	—	January 18, 2004	Kitt Peak	Spacewatch	·	2.8 km	MPC · JPL
770920	2016 CF_{277}	—	February 13, 2010	Mount Lemmon	Mount Lemmon Survey	·	2.2 km	MPC · JPL
770921	2016 CY_{278}	—	December 1, 2014	Haleakala	Pan-STARRS 1	·	2.1 km	MPC · JPL
770922	2016 CN_{279}	—	December 29, 2014	Haleakala	Pan-STARRS 1	·	2.6 km	MPC · JPL
770923	2016 CW_{281}	—	December 1, 2014	Haleakala	Pan-STARRS 1	·	1.8 km	MPC · JPL
770924	2016 CZ_{282}	—	February 6, 2016	Mount Lemmon	Mount Lemmon Survey	·	2.5 km	MPC · JPL
770925	2016 CK_{283}	—	January 16, 2011	Mount Lemmon	Mount Lemmon Survey	GEF	920 m	MPC · JPL
770926	2016 CC_{284}	—	December 29, 2014	Haleakala	Pan-STARRS 1	EOS	1.5 km	MPC · JPL
770927	2016 CW_{284}	—	February 4, 2016	Haleakala	Pan-STARRS 1	·	900 m	MPC · JPL
770928	2016 CX_{284}	—	March 25, 2012	Mount Lemmon	Mount Lemmon Survey	·	1.3 km	MPC · JPL
770929	2016 CK_{287}	—	February 5, 2016	Haleakala	Pan-STARRS 1	EOS	1.2 km	MPC · JPL
770930	2016 CF_{288}	—	October 28, 2008	Mount Lemmon	Mount Lemmon Survey	·	1.8 km	MPC · JPL
770931	2016 CR_{288}	—	December 29, 2014	Haleakala	Pan-STARRS 1	·	2.4 km	MPC · JPL
770932	2016 CS_{288}	—	January 18, 2015	Mount Lemmon	Mount Lemmon Survey	·	2.3 km	MPC · JPL
770933	2016 CV_{289}	—	January 2, 2011	Mount Lemmon	Mount Lemmon Survey	·	1.6 km	MPC · JPL
770934	2016 CA_{291}	—	February 1, 2016	Haleakala	Pan-STARRS 1	·	2.6 km	MPC · JPL
770935	2016 CY_{291}	—	August 9, 2013	Haleakala	Pan-STARRS 1	KOR	960 m	MPC · JPL
770936	2016 CF_{292}	—	November 17, 2014	Haleakala	Pan-STARRS 1	KOR	990 m	MPC · JPL
770937	2016 CH_{296}	—	February 23, 2011	Kitt Peak	Spacewatch	·	1.5 km	MPC · JPL
770938	2016 CK_{296}	—	September 25, 2013	Mount Lemmon	Mount Lemmon Survey	EOS	1.3 km	MPC · JPL
770939	2016 CN_{296}	—	November 21, 2014	Haleakala	Pan-STARRS 1	·	1.5 km	MPC · JPL
770940	2016 CP_{296}	—	February 3, 2016	Haleakala	Pan-STARRS 1	·	1.4 km	MPC · JPL
770941	2016 CR_{296}	—	October 10, 2008	Kitt Peak	Spacewatch	·	2.4 km	MPC · JPL
770942	2016 CQ_{299}	—	May 12, 2013	Haleakala	Pan-STARRS 1	V	460 m	MPC · JPL
770943	2016 CC_{300}	—	December 3, 2010	Mount Lemmon	Mount Lemmon Survey	·	1.1 km	MPC · JPL
770944	2016 CL_{300}	—	August 22, 2014	Haleakala	Pan-STARRS 1	·	1.3 km	MPC · JPL
770945	2016 CS_{300}	—	August 12, 2013	Haleakala	Pan-STARRS 1	EOS	1.2 km	MPC · JPL
770946	2016 CA_{301}	—	April 19, 2006	Kitt Peak	Spacewatch	·	540 m	MPC · JPL
770947	2016 CB_{301}	—	February 5, 2016	Haleakala	Pan-STARRS 1	·	900 m	MPC · JPL
770948	2016 CE_{301}	—	February 5, 2016	Haleakala	Pan-STARRS 1	·	1.7 km	MPC · JPL
770949	2016 CJ_{301}	—	November 26, 2014	Haleakala	Pan-STARRS 1	·	1.5 km	MPC · JPL
770950	2016 CZ_{302}	—	April 5, 2011	Kitt Peak	Spacewatch	·	2.0 km	MPC · JPL
770951	2016 CP_{303}	—	September 13, 2013	Mount Lemmon	Mount Lemmon Survey	·	2.7 km	MPC · JPL
770952	2016 CR_{303}	—	September 11, 2007	Mount Lemmon	Mount Lemmon Survey	·	2.3 km	MPC · JPL
770953	2016 CR_{305}	—	February 6, 2016	Haleakala	Pan-STARRS 1	·	1.5 km	MPC · JPL
770954	2016 CV_{305}	—	February 6, 2016	Haleakala	Pan-STARRS 1	·	1.3 km	MPC · JPL
770955	2016 CD_{306}	—	January 13, 2016	Mount Lemmon	Mount Lemmon Survey	·	1.6 km	MPC · JPL
770956	2016 CP_{306}	—	January 15, 2010	Mount Lemmon	Mount Lemmon Survey	·	2.8 km	MPC · JPL
770957	2016 CB_{307}	—	November 13, 2010	Mount Lemmon	Mount Lemmon Survey	·	1.1 km	MPC · JPL
770958	2016 CK_{308}	—	February 9, 2016	Haleakala	Pan-STARRS 1	·	570 m	MPC · JPL
770959	2016 CT_{308}	—	February 9, 2016	Haleakala	Pan-STARRS 1	·	2.3 km	MPC · JPL
770960	2016 CV_{308}	—	February 7, 2016	Mount Lemmon	Mount Lemmon Survey	·	1.5 km	MPC · JPL
770961	2016 CK_{310}	—	March 14, 2007	Kitt Peak	Spacewatch	GEF	1.0 km	MPC · JPL
770962	2016 CO_{312}	—	August 15, 2013	Haleakala	Pan-STARRS 1	AGN	850 m	MPC · JPL
770963	2016 CQ_{312}	—	August 31, 2014	Haleakala	Pan-STARRS 1	·	460 m	MPC · JPL
770964	2016 CO_{313}	—	January 20, 2015	Haleakala	Pan-STARRS 1	·	2.4 km	MPC · JPL
770965	2016 CX_{313}	—	August 17, 2012	Haleakala	Pan-STARRS 1	·	2.2 km	MPC · JPL
770966	2016 CL_{314}	—	February 10, 2016	Haleakala	Pan-STARRS 1	·	2.5 km	MPC · JPL
770967	2016 CO_{314}	—	November 27, 2013	Haleakala	Pan-STARRS 1	·	2.3 km	MPC · JPL
770968	2016 CU_{314}	—	November 9, 2013	Kitt Peak	Spacewatch	·	2.5 km	MPC · JPL
770969	2016 CE_{315}	—	February 28, 2012	Haleakala	Pan-STARRS 1	·	1.2 km	MPC · JPL
770970	2016 CJ_{316}	—	March 9, 2011	Mount Lemmon	Mount Lemmon Survey	·	1.3 km	MPC · JPL
770971	2016 CT_{316}	—	September 1, 2013	Haleakala	Pan-STARRS 1	·	1.9 km	MPC · JPL
770972	2016 CC_{317}	—	April 30, 2011	Mount Lemmon	Mount Lemmon Survey	·	2.0 km	MPC · JPL
770973	2016 CF_{317}	—	October 27, 2008	Kitt Peak	Spacewatch	EOS	1.5 km	MPC · JPL
770974	2016 CK_{317}	—	February 11, 2016	Haleakala	Pan-STARRS 1	·	1.2 km	MPC · JPL
770975	2016 CC_{322}	—	February 14, 2016	Mount Lemmon	Mount Lemmon Survey	·	1.8 km	MPC · JPL
770976	2016 CV_{322}	—	February 14, 2016	Haleakala	Pan-STARRS 1	TIR	2.4 km	MPC · JPL
770977	2016 CA_{323}	—	February 11, 2016	Haleakala	Pan-STARRS 1	·	2.2 km	MPC · JPL
770978	2016 CE_{323}	—	October 21, 2007	Kitt Peak	Spacewatch	·	560 m	MPC · JPL
770979	2016 CQ_{329}	—	February 9, 2016	Haleakala	Pan-STARRS 1	·	1.8 km	MPC · JPL
770980	2016 CZ_{329}	—	February 10, 2016	Haleakala	Pan-STARRS 1	·	2.1 km	MPC · JPL
770981	2016 CV_{330}	—	February 11, 2016	Haleakala	Pan-STARRS 1	·	1.5 km	MPC · JPL
770982	2016 CO_{333}	—	February 11, 2016	Haleakala	Pan-STARRS 1	·	540 m	MPC · JPL
770983	2016 CP_{333}	—	February 12, 2016	Haleakala	Pan-STARRS 1	·	1.6 km	MPC · JPL
770984	2016 CM_{337}	—	December 15, 2014	Mount Lemmon	Mount Lemmon Survey	EOS	1.5 km	MPC · JPL
770985	2016 CQ_{337}	—	February 11, 2016	Haleakala	Pan-STARRS 1	·	1.5 km	MPC · JPL
770986	2016 CR_{337}	—	February 5, 2016	Haleakala	Pan-STARRS 1	EOS	1.5 km	MPC · JPL
770987	2016 CV_{337}	—	February 6, 2016	Haleakala	Pan-STARRS 1	·	2.4 km	MPC · JPL
770988	2016 CY_{337}	—	February 10, 2016	Haleakala	Pan-STARRS 1	·	2.3 km	MPC · JPL
770989	2016 CZ_{338}	—	February 5, 2016	Haleakala	Pan-STARRS 1	EOS	1.4 km	MPC · JPL
770990	2016 CG_{339}	—	February 11, 2016	Haleakala	Pan-STARRS 1	EOS	1.3 km	MPC · JPL
770991	2016 CX_{339}	—	February 5, 2016	Haleakala	Pan-STARRS 1	·	1.9 km	MPC · JPL
770992	2016 CS_{340}	—	February 11, 2016	Haleakala	Pan-STARRS 1	·	1.6 km	MPC · JPL
770993	2016 CW_{340}	—	February 9, 2016	Haleakala	Pan-STARRS 1	·	1.7 km	MPC · JPL
770994	2016 CR_{345}	—	February 9, 2016	Haleakala	Pan-STARRS 1	EOS	1.5 km	MPC · JPL
770995	2016 CC_{351}	—	February 10, 2016	Haleakala	Pan-STARRS 1	·	1.2 km	MPC · JPL
770996	2016 CE_{351}	—	February 11, 2016	Haleakala	Pan-STARRS 1	·	1.7 km	MPC · JPL
770997	2016 CK_{351}	—	February 1, 2016	Haleakala	Pan-STARRS 1	·	1.3 km	MPC · JPL
770998	2016 CQ_{351}	—	October 5, 2013	Haleakala	Pan-STARRS 1	·	1.9 km	MPC · JPL
770999	2016 CT_{353}	—	February 5, 2016	Haleakala	Pan-STARRS 1	·	1.8 km	MPC · JPL
771000	2016 CV_{356}	—	February 11, 2016	Haleakala	Pan-STARRS 1	EOS	1.3 km	MPC · JPL

back to top

== Meaning of names ==
As minor planet discoveries are confirmed, they are given a permanent number by the IAU's Minor Planet Center (MPC), and the discoverers can then submit names for them, following the IAU's naming conventions. The list below concerns those minor planets in the specified number-range that have received names, and explains the meanings of those names.

Official naming citations of newly named small Solar System bodies are approved and published in a bulletin by IAU's Working Group for Small Bodies Nomenclature (WGSBN). Before May 2021, citations were published in MPC's Minor Planet Circulars for many decades. Recent citations can also be found on the JPL Small-Body Database (SBDB). Until his death in 2016, German astronomer Lutz D. Schmadel compiled these citations into the Dictionary of Minor Planet Names (DMP) and regularly updated the collection.

Based on Paul Herget's The Names of the Minor Planets, Schmadel also researched the unclear origin of numerous asteroids, most of which had been named prior to World War II. This article incorporates text from this source, which is in the public domain: SBDB New namings may only be added to this list below after official publication as the preannouncement of names is condemned. The WGSBN publishes a comprehensive guideline for the naming rules of non-cometary small Solar System bodies.

Named minor planet	Provisional	This minor planet was named for...	Ref · Catalog
770175 Flueras	2015 XC_{10}	Horatius Flueras, Romanian amateur astronomer and Ph.D. sociology researcher from Cluj-Napoca.	IAU · 770175
