= List of minor planets: 621001–622000 =

The following is a partial list of minor planets, running from minor-planet number 621001 through 622000, inclusive. The primary data for this and other partial lists is based on JPL's "Small-Body Orbital Elements" and data available from the Minor Planet Center. Critical list information is also provided by the MPC, unless otherwise specified from Lowell Observatory. A detailed description of the table's columns and additional sources are given on the main page including a complete list of every page in this series, and a statistical break-up on the dynamical classification of minor planets.

Also see the summary list of all named bodies in numerical and alphabetical order, and the corresponding naming citations for the number range of this particular list. New namings may only be added to this list after official publication, as the preannouncement of names is condemned by the Working Group for Small Bodies Nomenclature of the International Astronomical Union.

Near-Earth obj.	MBA (inner)	MBA (outer)	Centaur
Mars-crosser	MBA (middle)	Jupiter trojan	Trans-Neptunian obj.
Unclassified

== 621001–621100 ==
Designation			Discovery			Properties		Ref
Permanent	Provisional	Named after	Date	Site	Discoverer(s)	Category	Diam.	Ref
621001	2007 HK_{102}	—	April 25, 2007	Kitt Peak	Spacewatch	·	1.5 km	MPC · JPL
621002	2007 HS_{105}	—	April 18, 2007	Kitt Peak	Spacewatch	·	1.8 km	MPC · JPL
621003	2007 HP_{110}	—	April 25, 2007	Mount Lemmon	Mount Lemmon Survey	·	1.8 km	MPC · JPL
621004	2007 HC_{112}	—	April 25, 2007	Kitt Peak	Spacewatch	·	530 m	MPC · JPL
621005	2007 HW_{112}	—	April 22, 2007	Kitt Peak	Spacewatch	·	720 m	MPC · JPL
621006	2007 JL_{1}	—	April 20, 2007	Mount Lemmon	Mount Lemmon Survey	·	1.1 km	MPC · JPL
621007	2007 JL_{4}	—	April 19, 2007	Kitt Peak	Spacewatch	·	3.1 km	MPC · JPL
621008	2007 JU_{43}	—	May 13, 2007	Mount Lemmon	Mount Lemmon Survey	·	2.3 km	MPC · JPL
621009	2007 KE_{11}	—	May 10, 2015	Mount Lemmon	Mount Lemmon Survey	·	750 m	MPC · JPL
621010	2007 KL_{12}	—	May 26, 2007	Mount Lemmon	Mount Lemmon Survey	·	2.1 km	MPC · JPL
621011	2007 LS_{10}	—	April 19, 2007	Mount Lemmon	Mount Lemmon Survey	·	660 m	MPC · JPL
621012	2007 LM_{16}	—	May 12, 2007	Mount Lemmon	Mount Lemmon Survey	·	1.7 km	MPC · JPL
621013	2007 LN_{23}	—	June 13, 2007	Kitt Peak	Spacewatch	EUN	940 m	MPC · JPL
621014	2007 LM_{28}	—	June 15, 2007	Kitt Peak	Spacewatch	·	930 m	MPC · JPL
621015	2007 LZ_{38}	—	May 16, 2007	Kitt Peak	Spacewatch	·	880 m	MPC · JPL
621016	2007 MW_{3}	—	June 7, 2007	Kitt Peak	Spacewatch	·	950 m	MPC · JPL
621017	2007 MQ_{8}	—	June 14, 2007	Kitt Peak	Spacewatch	TIR	2.1 km	MPC · JPL
621018	2007 MK_{15}	—	June 20, 2007	Kitt Peak	Spacewatch	·	2.0 km	MPC · JPL
621019	2007 PH_{6}	—	August 8, 2007	Eskridge	G. Hug	·	480 m	MPC · JPL
621020	2007 PX_{29}	—	August 8, 2007	Socorro	LINEAR	·	1.0 km	MPC · JPL
621021	2007 PE_{34}	—	August 13, 2007	Socorro	LINEAR	·	3.1 km	MPC · JPL
621022	2007 PY_{44}	—	July 20, 2007	Siding Spring	SSS	T_{j} (2.94)	3.3 km	MPC · JPL
621023	2007 PA_{53}	—	August 12, 2007	XuYi	PMO NEO Survey Program	·	820 m	MPC · JPL
621024	2007 PB_{53}	—	August 10, 2007	Kitt Peak	Spacewatch	·	810 m	MPC · JPL
621025	2007 PB_{55}	—	August 10, 2007	Kitt Peak	Spacewatch	·	860 m	MPC · JPL
621026	2007 QX_{15}	—	August 18, 2007	XuYi	PMO NEO Survey Program	·	2.4 km	MPC · JPL
621027	2007 QE_{18}	—	August 24, 2007	Kitt Peak	Spacewatch	(3460)	2.2 km	MPC · JPL
621028	2007 QU_{18}	—	August 22, 2007	Anderson Mesa	LONEOS	·	2.1 km	MPC · JPL
621029	2007 RD_{13}	—	September 2, 2007	Catalina	CSS	·	1.5 km	MPC · JPL
621030	2007 RJ_{14}	—	September 9, 2007	Dauban	Kugel, C. R. F.	·	1.2 km	MPC · JPL
621031	2007 RC_{18}	—	September 12, 2007	Dauban	Kugel, C. R. F.	·	2.2 km	MPC · JPL
621032	2007 RR_{29}	—	September 21, 2003	Palomar	NEAT	MAR	1.1 km	MPC · JPL
621033	2007 RD_{39}	—	September 8, 2007	Mount Lemmon	Mount Lemmon Survey	·	560 m	MPC · JPL
621034	2007 RT_{40}	—	September 9, 2007	Kitt Peak	Spacewatch	·	450 m	MPC · JPL
621035	2007 RC_{41}	—	September 3, 2007	Catalina	CSS	(1547)	1.5 km	MPC · JPL
621036	2007 RX_{41}	—	September 9, 2007	Kitt Peak	Spacewatch	·	500 m	MPC · JPL
621037	2007 RV_{44}	—	September 9, 2007	Kitt Peak	Spacewatch	(5)	1.2 km	MPC · JPL
621038	2007 RN_{51}	—	October 31, 1999	Kitt Peak	Spacewatch	·	890 m	MPC · JPL
621039	2007 RK_{54}	—	May 4, 2005	Mauna Kea	Veillet, C.	·	2.4 km	MPC · JPL
621040	2007 RP_{57}	—	September 9, 2007	Kitt Peak	Spacewatch	·	2.2 km	MPC · JPL
621041	2007 RU_{57}	—	September 9, 2007	Mount Lemmon	Mount Lemmon Survey	·	1.2 km	MPC · JPL
621042	2007 RM_{77}	—	September 10, 2007	Mount Lemmon	Mount Lemmon Survey	·	3.2 km	MPC · JPL
621043	2007 RL_{79}	—	September 10, 2007	Mount Lemmon	Mount Lemmon Survey	·	1.1 km	MPC · JPL
621044	2007 RV_{110}	—	September 11, 2007	Mount Lemmon	Mount Lemmon Survey	·	2.1 km	MPC · JPL
621045	2007 RS_{124}	—	September 12, 2007	Mount Lemmon	Mount Lemmon Survey	·	470 m	MPC · JPL
621046	2007 RR_{126}	—	September 12, 2007	Mount Lemmon	Mount Lemmon Survey	·	770 m	MPC · JPL
621047	2007 RZ_{127}	—	September 12, 2007	Mount Lemmon	Mount Lemmon Survey	·	630 m	MPC · JPL
621048	2007 RT_{133}	—	September 13, 2007	Taunus	E. Schwab, R. Kling	LIX	2.8 km	MPC · JPL
621049	2007 RD_{141}	—	September 13, 2007	Catalina	CSS	·	2.0 km	MPC · JPL
621050	2007 RO_{151}	—	September 10, 2007	Kitt Peak	Spacewatch	VER	3.1 km	MPC · JPL
621051	2007 RH_{161}	—	September 13, 2007	Anderson Mesa	LONEOS	·	1.2 km	MPC · JPL
621052	2007 RO_{161}	—	May 4, 2006	Kitt Peak	Spacewatch	·	1.9 km	MPC · JPL
621053	2007 RW_{166}	—	September 10, 2007	Kitt Peak	Spacewatch	·	750 m	MPC · JPL
621054	2007 RJ_{197}	—	May 5, 2006	Kitt Peak	Spacewatch	EOS	1.7 km	MPC · JPL
621055	2007 RA_{200}	—	September 13, 2007	Kitt Peak	Spacewatch	MIS	1.6 km	MPC · JPL
621056	2007 RD_{201}	—	September 13, 2007	Kitt Peak	Spacewatch	·	1.2 km	MPC · JPL
621057	2007 RL_{226}	—	September 10, 2007	Kitt Peak	Spacewatch	·	1.8 km	MPC · JPL
621058	2007 RH_{231}	—	March 26, 2006	Mount Lemmon	Mount Lemmon Survey	·	940 m	MPC · JPL
621059	2007 RU_{232}	—	September 11, 2007	XuYi	PMO NEO Survey Program	·	1.1 km	MPC · JPL
621060	2007 RF_{241}	—	September 10, 2007	Catalina	CSS	·	2.7 km	MPC · JPL
621061	2007 RL_{242}	—	September 3, 2007	Catalina	CSS	·	2.4 km	MPC · JPL
621062	2007 RA_{247}	—	October 29, 2003	Kitt Peak	Spacewatch	·	1.0 km	MPC · JPL
621063	2007 RD_{250}	—	September 13, 2007	Kitt Peak	Spacewatch	·	470 m	MPC · JPL
621064	2007 RT_{257}	—	August 24, 2007	Kitt Peak	Spacewatch	THM	2.1 km	MPC · JPL
621065	2007 RF_{283}	—	September 15, 2007	Catalina	CSS	T_{j} (2.91)	2.4 km	MPC · JPL
621066	2007 RP_{297}	—	July 13, 2001	Palomar	NEAT	·	2.1 km	MPC · JPL
621067	2007 RM_{307}	—	September 5, 2007	Anderson Mesa	LONEOS	·	3.0 km	MPC · JPL
621068	2007 RP_{307}	—	September 20, 2007	Mount Lemmon	Mount Lemmon Survey	·	2.4 km	MPC · JPL
621069	2007 RS_{307}	—	September 13, 2007	Mount Lemmon	Mount Lemmon Survey	·	1.1 km	MPC · JPL
621070	2007 RK_{309}	—	September 11, 2007	Mount Lemmon	Mount Lemmon Survey	EOS	1.9 km	MPC · JPL
621071	2007 RJ_{310}	—	September 5, 2007	Catalina	CSS	·	980 m	MPC · JPL
621072	2007 RB_{318}	—	September 10, 2007	Kitt Peak	Spacewatch	·	440 m	MPC · JPL
621073	2007 RU_{334}	—	September 24, 2015	Mount Lemmon	Mount Lemmon Survey	H	390 m	MPC · JPL
621074	2007 RC_{335}	—	May 16, 2012	Haleakala	Pan-STARRS 1	·	1.7 km	MPC · JPL
621075	2007 RS_{338}	—	September 3, 2007	Mount Lemmon	Mount Lemmon Survey	·	3.0 km	MPC · JPL
621076	2007 RV_{338}	—	September 11, 2007	Kitt Peak	Spacewatch	HYG	2.3 km	MPC · JPL
621077	2007 RD_{340}	—	September 11, 2007	XuYi	PMO NEO Survey Program	·	550 m	MPC · JPL
621078	2007 RZ_{340}	—	January 11, 2016	Haleakala	Pan-STARRS 1	TIR	2.5 km	MPC · JPL
621079	2007 RA_{342}	—	September 3, 2013	Calar Alto	F. Hormuth	·	1.9 km	MPC · JPL
621080	2007 RW_{343}	—	January 14, 2016	Haleakala	Pan-STARRS 1	ELF	2.6 km	MPC · JPL
621081	2007 RL_{344}	—	September 10, 2007	Mount Lemmon	Mount Lemmon Survey	·	2.4 km	MPC · JPL
621082	2007 RG_{346}	—	April 26, 2006	Cerro Tololo	Deep Ecliptic Survey	·	370 m	MPC · JPL
621083	2007 RH_{351}	—	September 10, 2007	Mount Lemmon	Mount Lemmon Survey	·	1.8 km	MPC · JPL
621084	2007 RR_{361}	—	September 12, 2007	Mount Lemmon	Mount Lemmon Survey	·	1.3 km	MPC · JPL
621085	2007 RY_{362}	—	September 12, 2007	Kitt Peak	Spacewatch	·	1.1 km	MPC · JPL
621086	2007 RR_{363}	—	September 14, 2007	Mount Lemmon	Mount Lemmon Survey	·	1.0 km	MPC · JPL
621087	2007 RB_{366}	—	September 13, 2007	Mount Lemmon	Mount Lemmon Survey	·	1 km	MPC · JPL
621088	2007 SO_{14}	—	September 8, 2007	Mount Lemmon	Mount Lemmon Survey	·	1.3 km	MPC · JPL
621089	2007 SF_{17}	—	September 12, 2007	Catalina	CSS	·	1.7 km	MPC · JPL
621090	2007 SX_{23}	—	October 12, 2007	Socorro	LINEAR	THB	2.4 km	MPC · JPL
621091	2007 TE_{2}	—	September 10, 2007	Catalina	CSS	·	490 m	MPC · JPL
621092	2007 TE_{23}	—	September 20, 2007	Kitt Peak	Spacewatch	·	1.2 km	MPC · JPL
621093	2007 TB_{49}	—	October 4, 2007	Kitt Peak	Spacewatch	·	530 m	MPC · JPL
621094	2007 TG_{52}	—	October 4, 2007	Kitt Peak	Spacewatch	MIS	2.2 km	MPC · JPL
621095	2007 TY_{53}	—	September 15, 2007	Mount Lemmon	Mount Lemmon Survey	JUN	630 m	MPC · JPL
621096	2007 TS_{61}	—	September 8, 2007	Mount Lemmon	Mount Lemmon Survey	·	630 m	MPC · JPL
621097	2007 TA_{73}	—	May 22, 2006	Mount Lemmon	Mount Lemmon Survey	MIS	1.8 km	MPC · JPL
621098	2007 TA_{91}	—	December 18, 2003	Kitt Peak	Spacewatch	(5)	930 m	MPC · JPL
621099	2007 TJ_{110}	—	September 15, 2007	Mount Lemmon	Mount Lemmon Survey	·	490 m	MPC · JPL
621100	2007 TO_{113}	—	September 21, 2007	XuYi	PMO NEO Survey Program	·	2.9 km	MPC · JPL

== 621101–621200 ==
back to top

Designation			Discovery			Properties		Ref
Permanent	Provisional	Named after	Date	Site	Discoverer(s)	Category	Diam.	Ref
621101	2007 TY_{117}	—	October 9, 2007	Kitt Peak	Spacewatch	·	630 m	MPC · JPL
621102	2007 TT_{118}	—	October 9, 2007	Mount Lemmon	Mount Lemmon Survey	·	470 m	MPC · JPL
621103	2007 TB_{123}	—	October 6, 2007	Kitt Peak	Spacewatch	·	500 m	MPC · JPL
621104	2007 TE_{125}	—	October 6, 2007	Kitt Peak	Spacewatch	·	530 m	MPC · JPL
621105	2007 TY_{126}	—	October 6, 2007	Kitt Peak	Spacewatch	·	620 m	MPC · JPL
621106	2007 TL_{130}	—	October 6, 2007	La Cañada	Lacruz, J.	·	590 m	MPC · JPL
621107	2007 TS_{147}	—	September 18, 2007	Anderson Mesa	LONEOS	·	3.0 km	MPC · JPL
621108	2007 TD_{151}	—	October 7, 2007	Catalina	CSS	·	1.0 km	MPC · JPL
621109	2007 TX_{166}	—	September 14, 2007	Mount Lemmon	Mount Lemmon Survey	·	560 m	MPC · JPL
621110	2007 TZ_{179}	—	October 7, 2007	Mount Lemmon	Mount Lemmon Survey	·	510 m	MPC · JPL
621111	2007 TQ_{191}	—	September 5, 2007	Catalina	CSS	(1547)	2.0 km	MPC · JPL
621112	2007 TV_{206}	—	October 10, 2007	Mount Lemmon	Mount Lemmon Survey	·	2.2 km	MPC · JPL
621113	2007 TZ_{218}	—	August 23, 2007	Kitt Peak	Spacewatch	·	510 m	MPC · JPL
621114	2007 TK_{225}	—	October 4, 2007	Kitt Peak	Spacewatch	(5)	900 m	MPC · JPL
621115	2007 TR_{236}	—	September 14, 2007	Mount Lemmon	Mount Lemmon Survey	·	2.4 km	MPC · JPL
621116	2007 TF_{239}	—	October 10, 2007	Mount Lemmon	Mount Lemmon Survey	·	980 m	MPC · JPL
621117	2007 TZ_{245}	—	October 9, 2007	Mount Lemmon	Mount Lemmon Survey	·	440 m	MPC · JPL
621118	2007 TA_{256}	—	October 10, 2007	Kitt Peak	Spacewatch	·	500 m	MPC · JPL
621119	2007 TE_{265}	—	October 11, 2007	Kitt Peak	Spacewatch	·	510 m	MPC · JPL
621120	2007 TE_{277}	—	September 9, 2007	Pla D'Arguines	R. Ferrando, Ferrando, M.	·	710 m	MPC · JPL
621121	2007 TY_{278}	—	October 11, 2007	Mount Lemmon	Mount Lemmon Survey	EUN	680 m	MPC · JPL
621122	2007 TG_{294}	—	October 10, 2007	Mount Lemmon	Mount Lemmon Survey	EUP	2.9 km	MPC · JPL
621123	2007 TK_{295}	—	October 10, 2007	Mount Lemmon	Mount Lemmon Survey	·	990 m	MPC · JPL
621124	2007 TZ_{295}	—	October 10, 2007	Mount Lemmon	Mount Lemmon Survey	·	1.2 km	MPC · JPL
621125	2007 TZ_{296}	—	October 10, 2007	Mount Lemmon	Mount Lemmon Survey	ADE	1.8 km	MPC · JPL
621126	2007 TW_{298}	—	September 5, 2007	Mount Lemmon	Mount Lemmon Survey	·	510 m	MPC · JPL
621127	2007 TZ_{308}	—	September 13, 2007	Mount Lemmon	Mount Lemmon Survey	·	1.2 km	MPC · JPL
621128	2007 TF_{319}	—	October 12, 2007	Kitt Peak	Spacewatch	EUN	860 m	MPC · JPL
621129	2007 TM_{322}	—	October 11, 2007	Kitt Peak	Spacewatch	·	1.1 km	MPC · JPL
621130	2007 TQ_{361}	—	October 15, 2007	Mount Lemmon	Mount Lemmon Survey	ADE	1.2 km	MPC · JPL
621131	2007 TU_{378}	—	October 12, 2007	Mount Lemmon	Mount Lemmon Survey	·	2.8 km	MPC · JPL
621132	2007 TO_{380}	—	October 14, 2007	Kitt Peak	Spacewatch	·	2.9 km	MPC · JPL
621133	2007 TA_{390}	—	October 8, 2007	Mount Lemmon	Mount Lemmon Survey	NEM	1.6 km	MPC · JPL
621134	2007 TE_{406}	—	May 22, 2001	Cerro Tololo	Deep Ecliptic Survey	THM	1.6 km	MPC · JPL
621135	2007 TT_{407}	—	October 15, 2007	Mount Lemmon	Mount Lemmon Survey	EUN	990 m	MPC · JPL
621136	2007 TP_{412}	—	October 14, 2007	Catalina	CSS	·	1.4 km	MPC · JPL
621137	2007 TH_{423}	—	October 4, 2007	Kitt Peak	Spacewatch	·	1.1 km	MPC · JPL
621138	2007 TA_{429}	—	October 12, 2007	Kitt Peak	Spacewatch	·	960 m	MPC · JPL
621139	2007 TE_{454}	—	September 14, 2007	Kitt Peak	Spacewatch	·	1.3 km	MPC · JPL
621140	2007 TW_{456}	—	October 8, 2007	Mount Lemmon	Mount Lemmon Survey	·	410 m	MPC · JPL
621141	2007 TT_{460}	—	January 30, 2009	Mount Lemmon	Mount Lemmon Survey	·	1.4 km	MPC · JPL
621142	2007 TS_{461}	—	October 12, 2007	Kitt Peak	Spacewatch	·	780 m	MPC · JPL
621143	2007 TT_{466}	—	September 3, 2013	Kitt Peak	Spacewatch	HYG	2.4 km	MPC · JPL
621144	2007 TS_{471}	—	December 24, 2013	Mount Lemmon	Mount Lemmon Survey	·	2.4 km	MPC · JPL
621145	2007 TR_{478}	—	October 9, 2007	Mount Lemmon	Mount Lemmon Survey	·	440 m	MPC · JPL
621146	2007 TK_{480}	—	October 11, 2007	Mount Lemmon	Mount Lemmon Survey	V	390 m	MPC · JPL
621147	2007 TM_{487}	—	October 10, 2007	Mount Lemmon	Mount Lemmon Survey	·	490 m	MPC · JPL
621148	2007 TQ_{490}	—	October 10, 2007	Mount Lemmon	Mount Lemmon Survey	·	1.4 km	MPC · JPL
621149	2007 TW_{503}	—	October 10, 2007	Mount Lemmon	Mount Lemmon Survey	·	1.4 km	MPC · JPL
621150	2007 UE	—	October 4, 2007	Kitt Peak	Spacewatch	·	2.6 km	MPC · JPL
621151	2007 UH_{2}	—	October 10, 2007	Catalina	CSS	·	1.5 km	MPC · JPL
621152	2007 UG_{41}	—	September 9, 2007	Mount Lemmon	Mount Lemmon Survey	(5)	860 m	MPC · JPL
621153	2007 UA_{44}	—	November 30, 2003	Kitt Peak	Spacewatch	·	1.0 km	MPC · JPL
621154	2007 UG_{44}	—	October 18, 2007	Mount Lemmon	Mount Lemmon Survey	WIT	720 m	MPC · JPL
621155	2007 UT_{77}	—	October 30, 2007	Kitt Peak	Spacewatch	·	430 m	MPC · JPL
621156	2007 UY_{79}	—	October 7, 2007	Mount Lemmon	Mount Lemmon Survey	·	550 m	MPC · JPL
621157	2007 UU_{81}	—	October 30, 2007	Kitt Peak	Spacewatch	·	950 m	MPC · JPL
621158	2007 UC_{82}	—	October 10, 2007	Kitt Peak	Spacewatch	·	2.4 km	MPC · JPL
621159	2007 UP_{92}	—	October 31, 2007	Mount Lemmon	Mount Lemmon Survey	ELF	2.9 km	MPC · JPL
621160	2007 UX_{94}	—	October 31, 2007	Mount Lemmon	Mount Lemmon Survey	·	1.1 km	MPC · JPL
621161	2007 UF_{110}	—	October 12, 2007	Kitt Peak	Spacewatch	·	1.3 km	MPC · JPL
621162	2007 UX_{121}	—	October 15, 2007	Kitt Peak	Spacewatch	·	540 m	MPC · JPL
621163	2007 UD_{143}	—	October 20, 2007	Mount Lemmon	Mount Lemmon Survey	(5)	1.0 km	MPC · JPL
621164	2007 UX_{143}	—	October 16, 2007	Mount Lemmon	Mount Lemmon Survey	·	1.5 km	MPC · JPL
621165	2007 UC_{152}	—	October 21, 2007	Mount Lemmon	Mount Lemmon Survey	·	1.0 km	MPC · JPL
621166	2007 UL_{152}	—	June 27, 2015	Haleakala	Pan-STARRS 1	·	1.6 km	MPC · JPL
621167	2007 UQ_{152}	—	June 17, 2010	Mount Lemmon	Mount Lemmon Survey	·	470 m	MPC · JPL
621168	2007 UB_{153}	—	June 22, 2015	Haleakala	Pan-STARRS 1	·	1.2 km	MPC · JPL
621169	2007 UP_{154}	—	October 18, 2007	Mount Lemmon	Mount Lemmon Survey	·	2.3 km	MPC · JPL
621170	2007 UP_{159}	—	October 16, 2007	Mount Lemmon	Mount Lemmon Survey	·	1.1 km	MPC · JPL
621171	2007 UA_{161}	—	October 20, 2007	Mount Lemmon	Mount Lemmon Survey	·	1.2 km	MPC · JPL
621172	2007 VW_{11}	—	November 1, 2007	Kitt Peak	Spacewatch	BAR	1.3 km	MPC · JPL
621173	2007 VQ_{12}	—	November 1, 2007	Kitt Peak	Spacewatch	VER	2.5 km	MPC · JPL
621174	2007 VE_{26}	—	October 6, 2007	Kitt Peak	Spacewatch	KON	1.9 km	MPC · JPL
621175	2007 VE_{37}	—	October 10, 2007	Catalina	CSS	·	1.1 km	MPC · JPL
621176	2007 VR_{37}	—	November 2, 2007	Mount Lemmon	Mount Lemmon Survey	·	530 m	MPC · JPL
621177	2007 VW_{53}	—	October 20, 2007	Mount Lemmon	Mount Lemmon Survey	(5)	910 m	MPC · JPL
621178	2007 VC_{70}	—	November 4, 2007	Mount Lemmon	Mount Lemmon Survey	·	1.2 km	MPC · JPL
621179	2007 VL_{105}	—	November 3, 2007	Kitt Peak	Spacewatch	·	2.5 km	MPC · JPL
621180	2007 VZ_{107}	—	November 3, 2007	Kitt Peak	Spacewatch	·	1.5 km	MPC · JPL
621181	2007 VK_{142}	—	November 4, 2007	Kitt Peak	Spacewatch	·	490 m	MPC · JPL
621182	2007 VN_{143}	—	November 4, 2007	Kitt Peak	Spacewatch	(5)	990 m	MPC · JPL
621183	2007 VD_{146}	—	October 24, 2007	Mount Lemmon	Mount Lemmon Survey	·	1.9 km	MPC · JPL
621184	2007 VT_{184}	—	November 7, 2007	Socorro	LINEAR	·	2.0 km	MPC · JPL
621185	2007 VG_{186}	—	June 20, 2007	Catalina	CSS	·	2.2 km	MPC · JPL
621186	2007 VO_{223}	—	October 8, 2007	Mount Lemmon	Mount Lemmon Survey	·	630 m	MPC · JPL
621187	2007 VC_{243}	—	November 9, 2007	Catalina	CSS	·	1.2 km	MPC · JPL
621188	2007 VE_{281}	—	October 14, 2007	Mount Lemmon	Mount Lemmon Survey	·	2.6 km	MPC · JPL
621189	2007 VE_{283}	—	November 14, 2007	Kitt Peak	Spacewatch	·	1.6 km	MPC · JPL
621190	2007 VD_{319}	—	November 3, 2007	Kitt Peak	Spacewatch	·	1.0 km	MPC · JPL
621191	2007 VO_{340}	—	November 4, 2007	Mount Lemmon	Mount Lemmon Survey	EUN	1.2 km	MPC · JPL
621192	2007 VW_{352}	—	September 1, 2010	ESA OGS	ESA OGS	·	570 m	MPC · JPL
621193	2007 VX_{355}	—	October 5, 2011	Charleston	R. Holmes	·	860 m	MPC · JPL
621194	2007 VD_{361}	—	November 1, 2013	Mount Lemmon	Mount Lemmon Survey	·	2.5 km	MPC · JPL
621195	2007 VQ_{369}	—	November 9, 2007	Kitt Peak	Spacewatch	MIS	1.8 km	MPC · JPL
621196	2007 VT_{375}	—	November 2, 2007	Mount Lemmon	Mount Lemmon Survey	·	1.1 km	MPC · JPL
621197	2007 VC_{377}	—	November 8, 2007	Kitt Peak	Spacewatch	·	2.4 km	MPC · JPL
621198	2007 WD_{16}	—	November 7, 2007	Kitt Peak	Spacewatch	·	2.9 km	MPC · JPL
621199	2007 WC_{29}	—	November 19, 2007	Kitt Peak	Spacewatch	·	1.3 km	MPC · JPL
621200	2007 WB_{48}	—	November 20, 2007	Mount Lemmon	Mount Lemmon Survey	·	450 m	MPC · JPL

== 621201–621300 ==
back to top

Designation			Discovery			Properties		Ref
Permanent	Provisional	Named after	Date	Site	Discoverer(s)	Category	Diam.	Ref
621201	2007 WW_{66}	—	November 4, 2007	Kitt Peak	Spacewatch	·	3.0 km	MPC · JPL
621202	2007 WO_{69}	—	July 19, 2015	Haleakala	Pan-STARRS 2	·	1.1 km	MPC · JPL
621203	2007 XD_{19}	—	November 13, 2007	Catalina	CSS	TIR	2.5 km	MPC · JPL
621204	2007 XO_{38}	—	December 18, 2007	Kitt Peak	Spacewatch	TIR	3.3 km	MPC · JPL
621205	2007 XC_{62}	—	September 9, 2007	Kitt Peak	Spacewatch	·	2.7 km	MPC · JPL
621206	2007 XF_{67}	—	April 25, 2014	Mount Lemmon	Mount Lemmon Survey	·	1.3 km	MPC · JPL
621207	2007 YC_{26}	—	December 18, 2007	Mount Lemmon	Mount Lemmon Survey	·	1.7 km	MPC · JPL
621208	2007 YE_{29}	—	December 5, 2007	Kitt Peak	Spacewatch	·	1.5 km	MPC · JPL
621209	2007 YC_{78}	—	October 18, 2011	Kitt Peak	Spacewatch	·	1.9 km	MPC · JPL
621210	2007 YS_{78}	—	May 4, 2014	Mount Lemmon	Mount Lemmon Survey	·	2.0 km	MPC · JPL
621211	2007 YM_{79}	—	December 30, 2007	Mount Lemmon	Mount Lemmon Survey	·	3.2 km	MPC · JPL
621212	2007 YV_{80}	—	December 30, 2007	Mount Lemmon	Mount Lemmon Survey	·	1.1 km	MPC · JPL
621213	2007 YF_{86}	—	January 2, 2017	Haleakala	Pan-STARRS 1	·	1.4 km	MPC · JPL
621214	2007 YF_{87}	—	December 31, 2007	Kitt Peak	Spacewatch	·	1.5 km	MPC · JPL
621215	2007 YT_{89}	—	January 25, 2014	Haleakala	Pan-STARRS 1	VER	2.3 km	MPC · JPL
621216	2007 YZ_{89}	—	December 10, 2014	Mount Lemmon	Mount Lemmon Survey	·	580 m	MPC · JPL
621217	2007 YC_{91}	—	December 30, 2007	Kitt Peak	Spacewatch	V	520 m	MPC · JPL
621218	2008 AZ_{38}	—	November 9, 2007	Mount Lemmon	Mount Lemmon Survey	(1547)	1.8 km	MPC · JPL
621219	2008 AG_{52}	—	January 11, 2008	Kitt Peak	Spacewatch	HNS	830 m	MPC · JPL
621220	2008 AY_{56}	—	January 11, 2008	Kitt Peak	Spacewatch	·	1.3 km	MPC · JPL
621221	2008 AF_{61}	—	December 31, 2007	Kitt Peak	Spacewatch	·	1.2 km	MPC · JPL
621222	2008 AL_{71}	—	December 15, 2007	Catalina	CSS	HNS	1.5 km	MPC · JPL
621223	2008 AA_{109}	—	January 11, 2008	Kitt Peak	Spacewatch	·	770 m	MPC · JPL
621224	2008 AC_{133}	—	September 20, 2003	Kitt Peak	Spacewatch	·	540 m	MPC · JPL
621225	2008 AS_{141}	—	January 10, 2008	Kitt Peak	Spacewatch	NYS	860 m	MPC · JPL
621226	2008 AA_{142}	—	September 6, 2006	Palomar	NEAT	·	2.8 km	MPC · JPL
621227	2008 CX_{51}	—	June 21, 2007	Mount Lemmon	Mount Lemmon Survey	·	1.4 km	MPC · JPL
621228	2008 CL_{87}	—	February 7, 2008	Mount Lemmon	Mount Lemmon Survey	PHO	590 m	MPC · JPL
621229	2008 CP_{109}	—	February 9, 2008	Kitt Peak	Spacewatch	·	1.2 km	MPC · JPL
621230	2008 CM_{125}	—	February 8, 2008	Kitt Peak	Spacewatch	V	540 m	MPC · JPL
621231	2008 CZ_{228}	—	September 9, 2015	Haleakala	Pan-STARRS 1	·	1.1 km	MPC · JPL
621232	2008 CA_{236}	—	February 8, 2008	Mount Lemmon	Mount Lemmon Survey	AGN	910 m	MPC · JPL
621233	2008 CZ_{238}	—	February 8, 2008	Mount Lemmon	Mount Lemmon Survey	·	1.6 km	MPC · JPL
621234	2008 CU_{241}	—	February 9, 2008	Mount Lemmon	Mount Lemmon Survey	·	590 m	MPC · JPL
621235	2008 CJ_{247}	—	February 10, 2008	Mount Lemmon	Mount Lemmon Survey	·	1.3 km	MPC · JPL
621236	2008 DY_{21}	—	February 9, 2008	Mount Lemmon	Mount Lemmon Survey	·	940 m	MPC · JPL
621237	2008 DS_{30}	—	January 11, 2008	Kitt Peak	Spacewatch	·	1.2 km	MPC · JPL
621238	2008 DM_{93}	—	November 18, 2015	Haleakala	Pan-STARRS 1	·	1.4 km	MPC · JPL
621239	2008 DZ_{96}	—	February 26, 2008	Mount Lemmon	Mount Lemmon Survey	V	480 m	MPC · JPL
621240	2008 DN_{99}	—	February 28, 2008	Kitt Peak	Spacewatch	KOR	1.2 km	MPC · JPL
621241	2008 EG_{23}	—	February 13, 2008	Catalina	CSS	·	900 m	MPC · JPL
621242	2008 EJ_{97}	—	March 8, 2008	Mount Lemmon	Mount Lemmon Survey	·	960 m	MPC · JPL
621243	2008 EA_{118}	—	February 26, 2008	Mount Lemmon	Mount Lemmon Survey	KOR	1.1 km	MPC · JPL
621244	2008 EX_{171}	—	April 3, 2008	Mount Lemmon	Mount Lemmon Survey	·	900 m	MPC · JPL
621245	2008 EY_{174}	—	March 27, 2012	Mount Lemmon	Mount Lemmon Survey	·	1.1 km	MPC · JPL
621246	2008 EK_{175}	—	December 13, 2010	Mauna Kea	M. Micheli, L. Wells	V	510 m	MPC · JPL
621247	2008 EB_{181}	—	August 20, 2009	Kitt Peak	Spacewatch	·	820 m	MPC · JPL
621248	2008 EW_{181}	—	March 13, 2008	Kitt Peak	Spacewatch	·	980 m	MPC · JPL
621249	2008 EU_{184}	—	October 28, 2017	Mount Lemmon	Mount Lemmon Survey	·	1.0 km	MPC · JPL
621250	2008 EM_{185}	—	March 28, 2012	Mount Lemmon	Mount Lemmon Survey	·	800 m	MPC · JPL
621251	2008 EV_{186}	—	March 15, 2008	Kitt Peak	Spacewatch	·	730 m	MPC · JPL
621252	2008 EC_{189}	—	March 27, 2012	Kitt Peak	Spacewatch	·	810 m	MPC · JPL
621253	2008 EL_{191}	—	March 12, 2008	Kitt Peak	Spacewatch	·	960 m	MPC · JPL
621254	2008 EF_{193}	—	March 8, 2008	Mount Lemmon	Mount Lemmon Survey	KOR	1.3 km	MPC · JPL
621255	2008 FO_{56}	—	March 28, 2008	Kitt Peak	Spacewatch	MAS	510 m	MPC · JPL
621256	2008 FW_{89}	—	February 28, 2008	Mount Lemmon	Mount Lemmon Survey	·	1.7 km	MPC · JPL
621257	2008 FS_{113}	—	March 31, 2008	Kitt Peak	Spacewatch	MAS	550 m	MPC · JPL
621258	2008 FE_{126}	—	March 26, 2008	Mount Lemmon	Mount Lemmon Survey	·	770 m	MPC · JPL
621259	2008 FR_{143}	—	March 28, 2008	Mount Lemmon	Mount Lemmon Survey	MAS	570 m	MPC · JPL
621260	2008 FW_{145}	—	March 26, 2008	Mount Lemmon	Mount Lemmon Survey	·	990 m	MPC · JPL
621261	2008 FG_{146}	—	March 29, 2008	Kitt Peak	Spacewatch	MAS	580 m	MPC · JPL
621262	2008 FA_{148}	—	March 28, 2008	Mount Lemmon	Mount Lemmon Survey	·	900 m	MPC · JPL
621263	2008 FG_{149}	—	March 29, 2008	Kitt Peak	Spacewatch	·	890 m	MPC · JPL
621264	2008 GW_{24}	—	April 1, 2008	Mount Lemmon	Mount Lemmon Survey	·	1.4 km	MPC · JPL
621265	2008 GD_{25}	—	April 1, 2008	Mount Lemmon	Mount Lemmon Survey	·	850 m	MPC · JPL
621266	2008 GT_{52}	—	March 28, 2008	Mount Lemmon	Mount Lemmon Survey	MAS	540 m	MPC · JPL
621267	2008 GU_{54}	—	April 5, 2008	Mount Lemmon	Mount Lemmon Survey	MAS	620 m	MPC · JPL
621268	2008 GP_{64}	—	March 15, 2008	Mount Lemmon	Mount Lemmon Survey	H	290 m	MPC · JPL
621269	2008 GV_{89}	—	April 6, 2008	Mount Lemmon	Mount Lemmon Survey	MAS	590 m	MPC · JPL
621270	2008 GZ_{150}	—	May 21, 2012	Mount Lemmon	Mount Lemmon Survey	·	760 m	MPC · JPL
621271	2008 GL_{154}	—	April 25, 2012	Mount Lemmon	Mount Lemmon Survey	·	1.1 km	MPC · JPL
621272	2008 GV_{157}	—	March 29, 2008	Kitt Peak	Spacewatch	·	940 m	MPC · JPL
621273	2008 GS_{161}	—	April 9, 2008	Kitt Peak	Spacewatch	·	920 m	MPC · JPL
621274	2008 GE_{163}	—	August 18, 2009	Kitt Peak	Spacewatch	·	750 m	MPC · JPL
621275	2008 GM_{163}	—	September 19, 2009	Kitt Peak	Spacewatch	·	790 m	MPC · JPL
621276	2008 GM_{164}	—	January 16, 2015	Haleakala	Pan-STARRS 1	CLA	1.1 km	MPC · JPL
621277	2008 GU_{167}	—	April 3, 2008	Mount Lemmon	Mount Lemmon Survey	L5	7.8 km	MPC · JPL
621278	2008 GD_{170}	—	April 4, 2008	Mount Lemmon	Mount Lemmon Survey	·	870 m	MPC · JPL
621279	2008 GO_{170}	—	April 7, 2008	Kitt Peak	Spacewatch	·	1.7 km	MPC · JPL
621280	2008 GS_{170}	—	April 4, 2008	Kitt Peak	Spacewatch	·	960 m	MPC · JPL
621281	2008 HY_{19}	—	April 14, 2008	Mount Lemmon	Mount Lemmon Survey	PHO	670 m	MPC · JPL
621282	2008 HA_{49}	—	April 29, 2008	Mount Lemmon	Mount Lemmon Survey	·	790 m	MPC · JPL
621283	2008 HH_{52}	—	April 29, 2008	Mount Lemmon	Mount Lemmon Survey	·	820 m	MPC · JPL
621284	2008 HR_{73}	—	April 27, 2008	Mount Lemmon	Mount Lemmon Survey	PHO	690 m	MPC · JPL
621285	2008 HS_{75}	—	October 26, 2009	La Sagra	OAM	·	1.1 km	MPC · JPL
621286	2008 JN_{29}	—	August 24, 2001	Kitt Peak	Spacewatch	·	1.1 km	MPC · JPL
621287	2008 JR_{42}	—	May 7, 2008	Mount Lemmon	Mount Lemmon Survey	·	1.7 km	MPC · JPL
621288	2008 JL_{47}	—	September 15, 2013	Mount Lemmon	Mount Lemmon Survey	·	970 m	MPC · JPL
621289	2008 JV_{48}	—	September 6, 2016	Mount Lemmon	Mount Lemmon Survey	·	840 m	MPC · JPL
621290	2008 JN_{53}	—	May 2, 2008	Kitt Peak	Spacewatch	V	480 m	MPC · JPL
621291	2008 KZ_{6}	—	May 26, 2008	Kitt Peak	Spacewatch	·	1.4 km	MPC · JPL
621292	2008 KR_{14}	—	May 4, 2008	Kitt Peak	Spacewatch	·	1.5 km	MPC · JPL
621293	2008 KG_{19}	—	October 1, 2005	Kitt Peak	Spacewatch	·	1.1 km	MPC · JPL
621294	2008 KS_{19}	—	May 8, 2008	Kitt Peak	Spacewatch	·	1.7 km	MPC · JPL
621295	2008 KR_{47}	—	September 17, 2009	Kitt Peak	Spacewatch	·	1.4 km	MPC · JPL
621296	2008 KV_{48}	—	May 28, 2008	Kitt Peak	Spacewatch	·	910 m	MPC · JPL
621297	2008 LA_{2}	—	May 5, 2008	Mount Lemmon	Mount Lemmon Survey	·	1.0 km	MPC · JPL
621298	2008 LZ_{13}	—	June 7, 2008	Kitt Peak	Spacewatch	·	1.8 km	MPC · JPL
621299	2008 LF_{19}	—	September 12, 2013	Mount Lemmon	Mount Lemmon Survey	L5	7.8 km	MPC · JPL
621300	2008 NK_{6}	—	July 2, 2008	Kitt Peak	Spacewatch	·	860 m	MPC · JPL

== 621301–621400 ==
back to top

Designation			Discovery			Properties		Ref
Permanent	Provisional	Named after	Date	Site	Discoverer(s)	Category	Diam.	Ref
621301	2008 OA_{4}	—	July 26, 2008	Siding Spring	SSS	·	1.6 km	MPC · JPL
621302	2008 OH_{5}	—	July 28, 2008	Mount Lemmon	Mount Lemmon Survey	·	890 m	MPC · JPL
621303	2008 OO_{19}	—	July 29, 2008	Kitt Peak	Spacewatch	·	1.8 km	MPC · JPL
621304	2008 OS_{27}	—	July 28, 2008	Siding Spring	SSS	·	1.4 km	MPC · JPL
621305	2008 OM_{31}	—	July 30, 2008	Kitt Peak	Spacewatch	·	920 m	MPC · JPL
621306	2008 PT_{13}	—	August 10, 2008	Dauban	Kugel, C. R. F.	·	1.1 km	MPC · JPL
621307	2008 PW_{22}	—	August 7, 2008	Kitt Peak	Spacewatch	·	810 m	MPC · JPL
621308	2008 QX	—	July 29, 2008	Kitt Peak	Spacewatch	·	1.2 km	MPC · JPL
621309	2008 QL_{3}	—	August 24, 2008	Piszkéstető	K. Sárneczky	LIX	3.1 km	MPC · JPL
621310	2008 QX_{19}	—	September 30, 2003	Kitt Peak	Spacewatch	·	2.4 km	MPC · JPL
621311	2008 QY_{33}	—	September 2, 2008	Kitt Peak	Spacewatch	·	2.6 km	MPC · JPL
621312	2008 QJ_{39}	—	August 24, 2008	Kitt Peak	Spacewatch	·	2.1 km	MPC · JPL
621313	2008 QR_{49}	—	March 22, 2015	Mount Lemmon	Mount Lemmon Survey	·	1.0 km	MPC · JPL
621314	2008 QB_{51}	—	August 21, 2008	Kitt Peak	Spacewatch	NYS	760 m	MPC · JPL
621315	2008 RQ_{6}	—	July 25, 2008	Mount Lemmon	Mount Lemmon Survey	EOS	1.4 km	MPC · JPL
621316	2008 RW_{13}	—	September 4, 2008	Kitt Peak	Spacewatch	·	2.0 km	MPC · JPL
621317	2008 RL_{14}	—	August 24, 2008	Kitt Peak	Spacewatch	·	2.0 km	MPC · JPL
621318	2008 RR_{29}	—	September 2, 2008	Kitt Peak	Spacewatch	·	2.1 km	MPC · JPL
621319	2008 RT_{35}	—	September 2, 2008	Kitt Peak	Spacewatch	·	2.3 km	MPC · JPL
621320	2008 RL_{61}	—	July 29, 2008	Kitt Peak	Spacewatch	·	940 m	MPC · JPL
621321	2008 RY_{90}	—	August 7, 2008	Kitt Peak	Spacewatch	·	2.2 km	MPC · JPL
621322	2008 RX_{125}	—	September 9, 2008	Mount Lemmon	Mount Lemmon Survey	·	2.0 km	MPC · JPL
621323	2008 RD_{127}	—	September 5, 2008	Kitt Peak	Spacewatch	TIR	2.5 km	MPC · JPL
621324	2008 RJ_{127}	—	September 6, 2008	Kitt Peak	Spacewatch	·	2.2 km	MPC · JPL
621325	2008 RM_{127}	—	September 6, 2008	Kitt Peak	Spacewatch	·	1.7 km	MPC · JPL
621326	2008 RA_{148}	—	August 24, 2008	Kitt Peak	Spacewatch	·	2.0 km	MPC · JPL
621327	2008 RS_{152}	—	September 4, 2008	Kitt Peak	Spacewatch	NYS	890 m	MPC · JPL
621328	2008 RF_{153}	—	September 4, 2008	Kitt Peak	Spacewatch	·	2.0 km	MPC · JPL
621329	2008 RG_{154}	—	September 1, 2008	Siding Spring	SSS	·	1.8 km	MPC · JPL
621330	2008 RS_{155}	—	September 5, 2008	Kitt Peak	Spacewatch	(1547)	960 m	MPC · JPL
621331	2008 RS_{162}	—	September 6, 2008	Mount Lemmon	Mount Lemmon Survey	·	900 m	MPC · JPL
621332	2008 RY_{163}	—	September 7, 2008	Mount Lemmon	Mount Lemmon Survey	EOS	1.5 km	MPC · JPL
621333	2008 RJ_{164}	—	October 28, 2014	Haleakala	Pan-STARRS 1	·	1.5 km	MPC · JPL
621334	2008 RO_{164}	—	September 7, 2008	Mount Lemmon	Mount Lemmon Survey	THM	1.6 km	MPC · JPL
621335	2008 RH_{176}	—	September 2, 2008	Kitt Peak	Spacewatch	EOS	1.2 km	MPC · JPL
621336	2008 SO_{14}	—	September 18, 2003	Kitt Peak	Spacewatch	·	2.0 km	MPC · JPL
621337	2008 SD_{20}	—	July 29, 2008	Kitt Peak	Spacewatch	·	720 m	MPC · JPL
621338	2008 SX_{21}	—	September 19, 2008	Kitt Peak	Spacewatch	·	1.1 km	MPC · JPL
621339	2008 SX_{24}	—	September 19, 2008	Kitt Peak	Spacewatch	3:2 · SHU	5.8 km	MPC · JPL
621340	2008 SZ_{30}	—	April 22, 2007	Kitt Peak	Spacewatch	·	2.1 km	MPC · JPL
621341	2008 SS_{44}	—	September 20, 2008	Kitt Peak	Spacewatch	·	2.1 km	MPC · JPL
621342	2008 SB_{74}	—	September 23, 2008	Kitt Peak	Spacewatch	·	2.0 km	MPC · JPL
621343	2008 SG_{95}	—	September 21, 2008	Kitt Peak	Spacewatch	·	1.3 km	MPC · JPL
621344	2008 SL_{118}	—	September 22, 2008	Mount Lemmon	Mount Lemmon Survey	VER	1.9 km	MPC · JPL
621345	2008 SE_{149}	—	September 28, 2008	Sandlot	G. Hug	THM	2.0 km	MPC · JPL
621346	2008 SO_{181}	—	September 24, 2008	Kitt Peak	Spacewatch	·	2.5 km	MPC · JPL
621347	2008 SO_{209}	—	September 19, 2008	Kitt Peak	Spacewatch	·	980 m	MPC · JPL
621348	2008 SL_{228}	—	September 28, 2008	Mount Lemmon	Mount Lemmon Survey	·	1.9 km	MPC · JPL
621349	2008 SR_{253}	—	September 22, 2008	Kitt Peak	Spacewatch	·	1.9 km	MPC · JPL
621350	2008 SN_{263}	—	September 24, 2008	Kitt Peak	Spacewatch	·	740 m	MPC · JPL
621351	2008 SH_{276}	—	September 23, 2008	Mount Lemmon	Mount Lemmon Survey	·	1.8 km	MPC · JPL
621352	2008 SG_{319}	—	September 22, 2008	Kitt Peak	Spacewatch	·	2.2 km	MPC · JPL
621353	2008 SZ_{321}	—	September 28, 2008	Mount Lemmon	Mount Lemmon Survey	·	950 m	MPC · JPL
621354	2008 ST_{324}	—	July 16, 2013	Haleakala	Pan-STARRS 1	·	2.7 km	MPC · JPL
621355	2008 SU_{324}	—	September 23, 2008	Kitt Peak	Spacewatch	·	2.2 km	MPC · JPL
621356	2008 SY_{325}	—	September 20, 2008	Mount Lemmon	Mount Lemmon Survey	·	1.9 km	MPC · JPL
621357	2008 SX_{328}	—	July 12, 2013	Haleakala	Pan-STARRS 1	TIR	2.4 km	MPC · JPL
621358	2008 SC_{333}	—	September 26, 2012	Mount Lemmon	Mount Lemmon Survey	·	1.0 km	MPC · JPL
621359	2008 SC_{335}	—	September 29, 2008	Kitt Peak	Spacewatch	·	2.0 km	MPC · JPL
621360	2008 SR_{340}	—	September 29, 2008	Mount Lemmon	Mount Lemmon Survey	EOS	1.4 km	MPC · JPL
621361	2008 SC_{343}	—	September 29, 2008	Mount Lemmon	Mount Lemmon Survey	·	940 m	MPC · JPL
621362	2008 TR_{46}	—	October 1, 2008	Kitt Peak	Spacewatch	·	830 m	MPC · JPL
621363	2008 TL_{56}	—	October 2, 2008	Kitt Peak	Spacewatch	TIR	2.5 km	MPC · JPL
621364	2008 TN_{82}	—	September 20, 2008	Kitt Peak	Spacewatch	·	1.8 km	MPC · JPL
621365	2008 TM_{85}	—	September 4, 2008	Kitt Peak	Spacewatch	·	2.0 km	MPC · JPL
621366	2008 TM_{93}	—	September 3, 2008	Kitt Peak	Spacewatch	·	1.7 km	MPC · JPL
621367	2008 TZ_{96}	—	September 25, 2008	Kitt Peak	Spacewatch	MAR	770 m	MPC · JPL
621368	2008 TT_{103}	—	September 24, 2008	Kitt Peak	Spacewatch	·	1.8 km	MPC · JPL
621369	2008 TJ_{125}	—	September 23, 2008	Kitt Peak	Spacewatch	·	2.4 km	MPC · JPL
621370	2008 TS_{132}	—	September 23, 2008	Kitt Peak	Spacewatch	·	2.3 km	MPC · JPL
621371	2008 TP_{145}	—	October 9, 2008	Mount Lemmon	Mount Lemmon Survey	·	2.2 km	MPC · JPL
621372	2008 TC_{146}	—	October 9, 2008	Mount Lemmon	Mount Lemmon Survey	·	1.5 km	MPC · JPL
621373	2008 TK_{147}	—	September 3, 2008	Kitt Peak	Spacewatch	THM	1.9 km	MPC · JPL
621374	2008 TY_{185}	—	October 7, 2008	Kitt Peak	Spacewatch	·	2.5 km	MPC · JPL
621375	2008 TN_{192}	—	October 1, 2008	Kitt Peak	Spacewatch	·	2.2 km	MPC · JPL
621376	2008 TO_{192}	—	October 1, 2008	Mount Lemmon	Mount Lemmon Survey	·	1.0 km	MPC · JPL
621377	2008 TP_{198}	—	October 9, 2008	Mount Lemmon	Mount Lemmon Survey	EOS	1.5 km	MPC · JPL
621378	2008 TY_{198}	—	October 8, 2008	Mount Lemmon	Mount Lemmon Survey	·	2.1 km	MPC · JPL
621379	2008 TJ_{199}	—	October 29, 2014	Haleakala	Pan-STARRS 1	·	2.4 km	MPC · JPL
621380	2008 TK_{200}	—	October 10, 2008	Kitt Peak	Spacewatch	·	2.0 km	MPC · JPL
621381	2008 TK_{204}	—	July 13, 2013	Mount Lemmon	Mount Lemmon Survey	·	2.1 km	MPC · JPL
621382	2008 TW_{204}	—	April 27, 2012	Haleakala	Pan-STARRS 1	TIR	2.0 km	MPC · JPL
621383	2008 TY_{204}	—	July 15, 2013	Haleakala	Pan-STARRS 1	·	2.1 km	MPC · JPL
621384	2008 TE_{205}	—	October 6, 2008	Kitt Peak	Spacewatch	THM	1.7 km	MPC · JPL
621385	2008 TF_{205}	—	October 7, 2008	Kitt Peak	Spacewatch	·	2.3 km	MPC · JPL
621386	2008 TW_{205}	—	October 6, 2008	Mount Lemmon	Mount Lemmon Survey	·	2.4 km	MPC · JPL
621387	2008 TB_{206}	—	October 1, 2002	Haleakala	NEAT	·	2.9 km	MPC · JPL
621388	2008 TP_{207}	—	October 10, 2008	Mount Lemmon	Mount Lemmon Survey	·	2.5 km	MPC · JPL
621389	2008 TV_{208}	—	October 1, 2008	Kitt Peak	Spacewatch	·	1.9 km	MPC · JPL
621390	2008 TM_{219}	—	October 10, 2008	Mount Lemmon	Mount Lemmon Survey	·	2.6 km	MPC · JPL
621391	2008 UP	—	October 10, 2008	Kitt Peak	Spacewatch	·	1.8 km	MPC · JPL
621392	2008 UB_{3}	—	October 10, 2008	Mount Lemmon	Mount Lemmon Survey	·	2.8 km	MPC · JPL
621393	2008 UK_{29}	—	October 20, 2008	Kitt Peak	Spacewatch	·	2.2 km	MPC · JPL
621394	2008 UY_{36}	—	October 20, 2008	Kitt Peak	Spacewatch	EUP	2.8 km	MPC · JPL
621395	2008 UM_{50}	—	September 29, 2008	Kitt Peak	Spacewatch	·	2.7 km	MPC · JPL
621396	2008 UD_{68}	—	October 21, 2008	Mount Lemmon	Mount Lemmon Survey	·	1.9 km	MPC · JPL
621397	2008 UQ_{89}	—	October 24, 2008	Kitt Peak	Spacewatch	·	2.8 km	MPC · JPL
621398	2008 UY_{114}	—	October 22, 2008	Kitt Peak	Spacewatch	·	2.6 km	MPC · JPL
621399	2008 UZ_{136}	—	October 23, 2008	Kitt Peak	Spacewatch	·	1.1 km	MPC · JPL
621400	2008 UA_{148}	—	October 23, 2008	Kitt Peak	Spacewatch	·	3.0 km	MPC · JPL

== 621401–621500 ==
back to top

Designation			Discovery			Properties		Ref
Permanent	Provisional	Named after	Date	Site	Discoverer(s)	Category	Diam.	Ref
621401	2008 UR_{150}	—	October 23, 2008	Mount Lemmon	Mount Lemmon Survey	·	1.4 km	MPC · JPL
621402	2008 UU_{162}	—	October 1, 2008	Kitt Peak	Spacewatch	EOS	1.6 km	MPC · JPL
621403	2008 UV_{165}	—	September 28, 2008	Mount Lemmon	Mount Lemmon Survey	EUP	2.7 km	MPC · JPL
621404	2008 UN_{167}	—	October 24, 2008	Kitt Peak	Spacewatch	·	1.9 km	MPC · JPL
621405	2008 US_{172}	—	October 24, 2008	Kitt Peak	Spacewatch	·	2.8 km	MPC · JPL
621406	2008 UK_{177}	—	October 24, 2008	Mount Lemmon	Mount Lemmon Survey	·	1.0 km	MPC · JPL
621407	2008 UV_{184}	—	October 24, 2008	Kitt Peak	Spacewatch	THM	2.1 km	MPC · JPL
621408	2008 UW_{190}	—	September 23, 2008	Kitt Peak	Spacewatch	·	1.8 km	MPC · JPL
621409	2008 UU_{197}	—	October 27, 2008	Mount Lemmon	Mount Lemmon Survey	EOS	1.5 km	MPC · JPL
621410	2008 UR_{217}	—	September 29, 2008	Mount Lemmon	Mount Lemmon Survey	·	2.5 km	MPC · JPL
621411	2008 UH_{236}	—	October 26, 2008	Kitt Peak	Spacewatch	·	2.3 km	MPC · JPL
621412	2008 UJ_{247}	—	October 3, 2008	Mount Lemmon	Mount Lemmon Survey	·	1.9 km	MPC · JPL
621413	2008 UG_{261}	—	October 4, 2004	Kitt Peak	Spacewatch	·	1.1 km	MPC · JPL
621414	2008 UZ_{269}	—	October 6, 2008	Mount Lemmon	Mount Lemmon Survey	EOS	1.4 km	MPC · JPL
621415	2008 UN_{270}	—	October 28, 2008	Kitt Peak	Spacewatch	·	2.3 km	MPC · JPL
621416	2008 UE_{274}	—	October 2, 2008	Mount Lemmon	Mount Lemmon Survey	·	2.8 km	MPC · JPL
621417	2008 UT_{291}	—	October 29, 2008	Kitt Peak	Spacewatch	·	2.3 km	MPC · JPL
621418	2008 UO_{292}	—	October 29, 2008	Kitt Peak	Spacewatch	·	700 m	MPC · JPL
621419	2008 UK_{296}	—	October 21, 2008	Kitt Peak	Spacewatch	T_{j} (2.95)	3.3 km	MPC · JPL
621420	2008 UU_{296}	—	September 22, 2008	Mount Lemmon	Mount Lemmon Survey	·	1.0 km	MPC · JPL
621421	2008 UZ_{297}	—	October 29, 2008	Kitt Peak	Spacewatch	·	900 m	MPC · JPL
621422	2008 UP_{305}	—	September 25, 2008	Kitt Peak	Spacewatch	EOS	1.5 km	MPC · JPL
621423	2008 UH_{317}	—	October 7, 2008	Kitt Peak	Spacewatch	·	2.1 km	MPC · JPL
621424	2008 UV_{335}	—	October 20, 2008	Kitt Peak	Spacewatch	EMA	2.4 km	MPC · JPL
621425	2008 UT_{339}	—	October 23, 2008	Kitt Peak	Spacewatch	·	2.5 km	MPC · JPL
621426	2008 UQ_{350}	—	October 23, 2008	Kitt Peak	Spacewatch	·	2.7 km	MPC · JPL
621427	2008 UP_{352}	—	October 21, 2008	Kitt Peak	Spacewatch	EUN	1.1 km	MPC · JPL
621428	2008 UE_{356}	—	October 21, 2008	Kitt Peak	Spacewatch	·	1.5 km	MPC · JPL
621429	2008 UF_{359}	—	October 27, 2008	Mount Lemmon	Mount Lemmon Survey	·	1.2 km	MPC · JPL
621430	2008 UK_{361}	—	October 27, 2008	Mount Lemmon	Mount Lemmon Survey	TIR	2.2 km	MPC · JPL
621431	2008 UY_{363}	—	October 26, 2008	Catalina	CSS	·	2.4 km	MPC · JPL
621432	2008 UT_{373}	—	September 29, 2008	Kitt Peak	Spacewatch	·	1.2 km	MPC · JPL
621433	2008 UO_{379}	—	October 24, 2008	Kitt Peak	Spacewatch	·	800 m	MPC · JPL
621434	2008 UQ_{383}	—	October 3, 2008	Kitt Peak	Spacewatch	·	960 m	MPC · JPL
621435	2008 UE_{384}	—	October 31, 2008	Mount Lemmon	Mount Lemmon Survey	·	940 m	MPC · JPL
621436	2008 UQ_{384}	—	July 14, 2013	Haleakala	Pan-STARRS 1	·	2.2 km	MPC · JPL
621437	2008 UC_{388}	—	June 4, 2013	Mount Lemmon	Mount Lemmon Survey	·	2.2 km	MPC · JPL
621438	2008 UN_{390}	—	September 1, 2013	Mount Lemmon	Mount Lemmon Survey	·	2.1 km	MPC · JPL
621439	2008 UU_{396}	—	October 28, 2008	Kitt Peak	Spacewatch	·	660 m	MPC · JPL
621440	2008 UJ_{398}	—	December 11, 2014	Mount Lemmon	Mount Lemmon Survey	·	2.0 km	MPC · JPL
621441	2008 UW_{399}	—	September 13, 2013	Mount Lemmon	Mount Lemmon Survey	·	2.8 km	MPC · JPL
621442	2008 UE_{402}	—	October 21, 2008	Kitt Peak	Spacewatch	(5)	880 m	MPC · JPL
621443	2008 UQ_{405}	—	October 20, 2008	Mount Lemmon	Mount Lemmon Survey	URS	2.0 km	MPC · JPL
621444	2008 VX_{7}	—	October 24, 2008	Catalina	CSS	·	1.8 km	MPC · JPL
621445	2008 VP_{14}	—	February 17, 2004	Kitt Peak	Spacewatch	T_{j} (2.95)	2.5 km	MPC · JPL
621446	2008 VU_{18}	—	October 24, 2008	Kitt Peak	Spacewatch	·	2.0 km	MPC · JPL
621447	2008 VC_{25}	—	September 29, 2008	Kitt Peak	Spacewatch	THM	1.9 km	MPC · JPL
621448	2008 VS_{34}	—	November 2, 2008	Mount Lemmon	Mount Lemmon Survey	·	910 m	MPC · JPL
621449	2008 VX_{45}	—	November 3, 2008	Mount Lemmon	Mount Lemmon Survey	·	2.4 km	MPC · JPL
621450	2008 VR_{54}	—	September 24, 2008	Kitt Peak	Spacewatch	·	2.1 km	MPC · JPL
621451	2008 VW_{84}	—	November 2, 2008	Mount Lemmon	Mount Lemmon Survey	·	840 m	MPC · JPL
621452	2008 VY_{86}	—	November 1, 2008	Mount Lemmon	Mount Lemmon Survey	·	1.0 km	MPC · JPL
621453	2008 VS_{89}	—	October 19, 2016	Mount Lemmon	Mount Lemmon Survey	·	1.2 km	MPC · JPL
621454	2008 VJ_{90}	—	February 10, 2016	Haleakala	Pan-STARRS 1	EOS	1.6 km	MPC · JPL
621455	2008 VX_{91}	—	May 16, 2012	Haleakala	Pan-STARRS 1	·	2.2 km	MPC · JPL
621456	2008 VN_{94}	—	November 7, 2008	Mount Lemmon	Mount Lemmon Survey	·	1.4 km	MPC · JPL
621457	2008 VM_{98}	—	November 8, 2008	Mount Lemmon	Mount Lemmon Survey	THM	2.0 km	MPC · JPL
621458	2008 VZ_{101}	—	November 3, 2008	Mount Lemmon	Mount Lemmon Survey	·	990 m	MPC · JPL
621459	2008 VD_{107}	—	November 6, 2008	Kitt Peak	Spacewatch	·	390 m	MPC · JPL
621460	2008 WH_{7}	—	November 17, 2008	Kitt Peak	Spacewatch	·	1.9 km	MPC · JPL
621461	2008 WJ_{33}	—	November 3, 2008	Catalina	CSS	TIR	3.0 km	MPC · JPL
621462	2008 WX_{35}	—	November 17, 2008	Kitt Peak	Spacewatch	THM	1.8 km	MPC · JPL
621463	2008 WT_{41}	—	November 17, 2008	Kitt Peak	Spacewatch	·	1.5 km	MPC · JPL
621464	2008 WY_{51}	—	October 9, 2008	Kitt Peak	Spacewatch	·	2.9 km	MPC · JPL
621465	2008 WF_{54}	—	September 25, 2008	Kitt Peak	Spacewatch	·	2.0 km	MPC · JPL
621466	2008 WD_{75}	—	November 2, 2008	Mount Lemmon	Mount Lemmon Survey	MAR	850 m	MPC · JPL
621467	2008 WP_{79}	—	November 20, 2008	Kitt Peak	Spacewatch	·	2.5 km	MPC · JPL
621468	2008 WP_{106}	—	November 18, 2008	Kitt Peak	Spacewatch	·	2.3 km	MPC · JPL
621469	2008 WZ_{115}	—	November 30, 2008	Kitt Peak	Spacewatch	·	3.0 km	MPC · JPL
621470	2008 WQ_{127}	—	October 29, 2008	Kitt Peak	Spacewatch	·	2.1 km	MPC · JPL
621471	2008 WD_{144}	—	November 19, 2008	Kitt Peak	Spacewatch	·	2.5 km	MPC · JPL
621472	2008 WR_{148}	—	November 19, 2008	Mount Lemmon	Mount Lemmon Survey	·	880 m	MPC · JPL
621473	2008 WT_{148}	—	November 21, 2014	Haleakala	Pan-STARRS 1	·	2.5 km	MPC · JPL
621474	2008 WX_{148}	—	February 9, 2016	Haleakala	Pan-STARRS 1	·	2.5 km	MPC · JPL
621475	2008 WD_{149}	—	November 20, 2008	Kitt Peak	Spacewatch	·	2.2 km	MPC · JPL
621476	2008 WK_{150}	—	December 26, 2009	Kitt Peak	Spacewatch	·	3.1 km	MPC · JPL
621477	2008 WQ_{152}	—	November 21, 2008	Kitt Peak	Spacewatch	·	800 m	MPC · JPL
621478	2008 WZ_{153}	—	September 24, 2013	Mount Lemmon	Mount Lemmon Survey	HYG	2.2 km	MPC · JPL
621479	2008 WB_{155}	—	November 20, 2008	Kitt Peak	Spacewatch	·	2.1 km	MPC · JPL
621480	2008 WO_{160}	—	November 24, 2008	Mount Lemmon	Mount Lemmon Survey	·	960 m	MPC · JPL
621481	2008 WC_{162}	—	November 21, 2008	Kitt Peak	Spacewatch	·	550 m	MPC · JPL
621482	2008 XE_{26}	—	September 24, 2008	Mount Lemmon	Mount Lemmon Survey	·	2.5 km	MPC · JPL
621483	2008 XG_{62}	—	February 3, 2016	Haleakala	Pan-STARRS 1	·	2.5 km	MPC · JPL
621484	2008 XW_{62}	—	January 14, 2016	Haleakala	Pan-STARRS 1	·	2.7 km	MPC · JPL
621485	2008 XZ_{63}	—	December 1, 2008	Kitt Peak	Spacewatch	·	1.2 km	MPC · JPL
621486	2008 XL_{64}	—	December 23, 2017	Haleakala	Pan-STARRS 1	·	980 m	MPC · JPL
621487	2008 YC_{21}	—	December 21, 2008	Mount Lemmon	Mount Lemmon Survey	·	1.4 km	MPC · JPL
621488	2008 YD_{22}	—	December 21, 2008	Mount Lemmon	Mount Lemmon Survey	(5)	970 m	MPC · JPL
621489	2008 YR_{30}	—	November 20, 2008	Kitt Peak	Spacewatch	·	2.3 km	MPC · JPL
621490	2008 YZ_{44}	—	December 1, 2008	Mount Lemmon	Mount Lemmon Survey	·	2.5 km	MPC · JPL
621491	2008 YU_{68}	—	December 31, 2008	Mount Lemmon	Mount Lemmon Survey	·	830 m	MPC · JPL
621492	2008 YW_{84}	—	December 31, 2008	Kitt Peak	Spacewatch	·	2.7 km	MPC · JPL
621493	2008 YH_{111}	—	December 31, 2008	Kitt Peak	Spacewatch	TIR	2.3 km	MPC · JPL
621494	2008 YP_{136}	—	December 30, 2008	Kitt Peak	Spacewatch	·	980 m	MPC · JPL
621495	2008 YE_{165}	—	December 30, 2008	Catalina	CSS	slow	2.7 km	MPC · JPL
621496	2008 YG_{178}	—	December 30, 2008	Mount Lemmon	Mount Lemmon Survey	·	540 m	MPC · JPL
621497	2008 YN_{178}	—	December 21, 2008	Mount Lemmon	Mount Lemmon Survey	·	530 m	MPC · JPL
621498	2008 YY_{181}	—	November 18, 2008	Kitt Peak	Spacewatch	·	2.4 km	MPC · JPL
621499	2008 YP_{185}	—	November 19, 2016	Mount Lemmon	Mount Lemmon Survey	·	970 m	MPC · JPL
621500	2008 YH_{186}	—	December 21, 2008	Mount Lemmon	Mount Lemmon Survey	·	1.3 km	MPC · JPL

== 621501–621600 ==
back to top

Designation			Discovery			Properties		Ref
Permanent	Provisional	Named after	Date	Site	Discoverer(s)	Category	Diam.	Ref
621501	2009 AE_{23}	—	January 3, 2009	Kitt Peak	Spacewatch	·	520 m	MPC · JPL
621502	2009 AZ_{31}	—	December 30, 2008	Mount Lemmon	Mount Lemmon Survey	H	380 m	MPC · JPL
621503	2009 AS_{65}	—	January 15, 2009	Kitt Peak	Spacewatch	EUN	840 m	MPC · JPL
621504	2009 BT_{36}	—	January 16, 2009	Kitt Peak	Spacewatch	·	1.6 km	MPC · JPL
621505	2009 BY_{114}	—	January 15, 2009	Kitt Peak	Spacewatch	T_{j} (2.94)	4.4 km	MPC · JPL
621506	2009 BZ_{117}	—	January 30, 2009	Kitt Peak	Spacewatch	·	990 m	MPC · JPL
621507	2009 BO_{124}	—	January 31, 2009	Kitt Peak	Spacewatch	·	540 m	MPC · JPL
621508	2009 BN_{157}	—	January 31, 2009	Kitt Peak	Spacewatch	·	1.1 km	MPC · JPL
621509	2009 BZ_{170}	—	January 16, 2009	Kitt Peak	Spacewatch	·	3.3 km	MPC · JPL
621510	2009 BB_{174}	—	January 25, 2009	Kitt Peak	Spacewatch	·	940 m	MPC · JPL
621511	2009 BJ_{176}	—	January 31, 2009	Mount Lemmon	Mount Lemmon Survey	·	1.5 km	MPC · JPL
621512	2009 BA_{191}	—	January 1, 2009	Mount Lemmon	Mount Lemmon Survey	·	940 m	MPC · JPL
621513	2009 BY_{202}	—	November 17, 2014	Haleakala	Pan-STARRS 1	·	2.3 km	MPC · JPL
621514	2009 CB_{40}	—	February 14, 2009	Mount Lemmon	Mount Lemmon Survey	(883)	420 m	MPC · JPL
621515	2009 CH_{69}	—	June 18, 2013	Haleakala	Pan-STARRS 1	·	550 m	MPC · JPL
621516	2009 CX_{70}	—	February 3, 2009	Mount Lemmon	Mount Lemmon Survey	HNS	740 m	MPC · JPL
621517	2009 CQ_{71}	—	February 2, 2009	Mount Lemmon	Mount Lemmon Survey	·	2.5 km	MPC · JPL
621518	2009 CZ_{73}	—	November 11, 2013	Catalina	CSS	·	2.6 km	MPC · JPL
621519	2009 DX_{75}	—	January 18, 2009	Mount Lemmon	Mount Lemmon Survey	TIR	2.0 km	MPC · JPL
621520	2009 DX_{147}	—	February 19, 2009	Mount Lemmon	Mount Lemmon Survey	·	600 m	MPC · JPL
621521	2009 EA_{34}	—	March 3, 2009	Kitt Peak	Spacewatch	·	1.6 km	MPC · JPL
621522	2009 EB_{37}	—	March 1, 2009	Kitt Peak	Spacewatch	·	620 m	MPC · JPL
621523	2009 FD_{32}	—	March 26, 2009	Cerro Burek	Burek, Cerro	L5	10 km	MPC · JPL
621524	2009 FC_{35}	—	February 13, 2002	Kitt Peak	Spacewatch	·	610 m	MPC · JPL
621525	2009 FF_{83}	—	July 13, 2013	Haleakala	Pan-STARRS 1	·	530 m	MPC · JPL
621526	2009 FX_{85}	—	February 28, 2009	Kitt Peak	Spacewatch	·	1.4 km	MPC · JPL
621527	2009 FD_{87}	—	March 31, 2009	Kitt Peak	Spacewatch	·	570 m	MPC · JPL
621528	2009 FM_{88}	—	September 4, 2010	Kitt Peak	Spacewatch	·	540 m	MPC · JPL
621529	2009 FD_{95}	—	March 29, 2009	Mount Lemmon	Mount Lemmon Survey	·	1.4 km	MPC · JPL
621530	2009 GK_{7}	—	June 27, 2014	Haleakala	Pan-STARRS 1	·	1.1 km	MPC · JPL
621531	2009 HM_{18}	—	April 19, 2009	Kitt Peak	Spacewatch	(1338) (FLO)	470 m	MPC · JPL
621532	2009 HB_{26}	—	February 26, 2009	Flagstaff	Wasserman, L. H.	·	480 m	MPC · JPL
621533	2009 HM_{56}	—	April 21, 2009	Mount Lemmon	Mount Lemmon Survey	·	500 m	MPC · JPL
621534	2009 HP_{64}	—	January 1, 2009	Mount Lemmon	Mount Lemmon Survey	L5	10 km	MPC · JPL
621535	2009 HE_{112}	—	October 2, 2010	Mount Lemmon	Mount Lemmon Survey	V	480 m	MPC · JPL
621536	2009 HW_{112}	—	August 8, 2013	Kitt Peak	Spacewatch	·	580 m	MPC · JPL
621537	2009 HY_{114}	—	July 13, 2013	Haleakala	Pan-STARRS 1	·	540 m	MPC · JPL
621538	2009 HC_{121}	—	April 27, 2009	Mount Lemmon	Mount Lemmon Survey	·	580 m	MPC · JPL
621539	2009 HJ_{123}	—	April 22, 2009	Mount Lemmon	Mount Lemmon Survey	·	700 m	MPC · JPL
621540	2009 JH_{13}	—	May 1, 2009	Cerro Burek	Burek, Cerro	·	760 m	MPC · JPL
621541	2009 JZ_{16}	—	April 23, 2009	Kitt Peak	Spacewatch	·	660 m	MPC · JPL
621542	2009 JX_{19}	—	August 9, 2013	Haleakala	Pan-STARRS 1	·	530 m	MPC · JPL
621543	2009 JU_{21}	—	March 23, 2015	Mount Lemmon	Mount Lemmon Survey	THM	1.9 km	MPC · JPL
621544	2009 KQ_{11}	—	August 27, 2006	Kitt Peak	Spacewatch	·	580 m	MPC · JPL
621545	2009 KA_{21}	—	October 13, 2006	Kitt Peak	Spacewatch	·	1.7 km	MPC · JPL
621546	2009 KP_{21}	—	May 29, 2009	Mount Lemmon	Mount Lemmon Survey	GAL	1.5 km	MPC · JPL
621547	2009 MN_{2}	—	June 17, 2009	Kitt Peak	Spacewatch	·	850 m	MPC · JPL
621548	2009 MM_{12}	—	June 23, 2009	Mount Lemmon	Mount Lemmon Survey	·	750 m	MPC · JPL
621549	2009 OQ	—	June 21, 2009	Mount Lemmon	Mount Lemmon Survey	·	1.8 km	MPC · JPL
621550	2009 OR_{5}	—	July 14, 2009	Kitt Peak	Spacewatch	·	620 m	MPC · JPL
621551	2009 OH_{13}	—	July 27, 2009	Kitt Peak	Spacewatch	·	990 m	MPC · JPL
621552	2009 OW_{26}	—	July 30, 2009	Kitt Peak	Spacewatch	PHO	1.2 km	MPC · JPL
621553	2009 ON_{27}	—	February 8, 2011	Mount Lemmon	Mount Lemmon Survey	NYS	830 m	MPC · JPL
621554	2009 PM_{2}	—	July 28, 2009	Kitt Peak	Spacewatch	·	980 m	MPC · JPL
621555	2009 PR_{3}	—	July 27, 2009	La Sagra	OAM	·	830 m	MPC · JPL
621556	2009 PF_{7}	—	August 15, 2009	Kitt Peak	Spacewatch	·	1.5 km	MPC · JPL
621557	2009 PN_{11}	—	August 15, 2009	Kitt Peak	Spacewatch	·	1.1 km	MPC · JPL
621558	2009 PO_{14}	—	August 15, 2009	Kitt Peak	Spacewatch	·	690 m	MPC · JPL
621559	2009 PW_{17}	—	August 15, 2009	Kitt Peak	Spacewatch	·	880 m	MPC · JPL
621560	2009 PE_{23}	—	October 17, 1995	Kitt Peak	Spacewatch	·	660 m	MPC · JPL
621561	2009 PA_{24}	—	August 1, 2009	Kitt Peak	Spacewatch	·	770 m	MPC · JPL
621562	2009 QT_{2}	—	August 16, 2009	Kitt Peak	Spacewatch	·	1.7 km	MPC · JPL
621563	2009 QH_{11}	—	August 13, 2009	Sandlot	G. Hug	·	700 m	MPC · JPL
621564	2009 QH_{17}	—	August 17, 2009	Kitt Peak	Spacewatch	ERI	870 m	MPC · JPL
621565	2009 QQ_{19}	—	June 14, 2005	Kitt Peak	Spacewatch	·	900 m	MPC · JPL
621566	2009 QS_{23}	—	August 16, 2009	Kitt Peak	Spacewatch	·	620 m	MPC · JPL
621567	2009 QQ_{24}	—	August 16, 2009	Catalina	CSS	PHO	880 m	MPC · JPL
621568	2009 QA_{26}	—	October 29, 2005	Kitt Peak	Spacewatch	·	1.4 km	MPC · JPL
621569	2009 QO_{26}	—	July 4, 2005	Haleakala	NEAT	·	1.1 km	MPC · JPL
621570	2009 QF_{33}	—	July 30, 2009	Kitt Peak	Spacewatch	·	1.5 km	MPC · JPL
621571	2009 QC_{40}	—	August 20, 2009	La Sagra	OAM	·	810 m	MPC · JPL
621572	2009 QC_{43}	—	August 16, 2009	Kitt Peak	Spacewatch	·	1.2 km	MPC · JPL
621573	2009 QH_{43}	—	August 15, 2009	Kitt Peak	Spacewatch	NYS	720 m	MPC · JPL
621574	2009 QV_{45}	—	August 15, 2009	La Sagra	OAM	·	860 m	MPC · JPL
621575	2009 QV_{52}	—	August 26, 2009	La Sagra	OAM	·	2.0 km	MPC · JPL
621576	2009 QW_{53}	—	August 18, 2009	Kitt Peak	Spacewatch	MAS	510 m	MPC · JPL
621577	2009 QC_{60}	—	August 16, 2009	Kitt Peak	Spacewatch	·	970 m	MPC · JPL
621578	2009 QC_{61}	—	August 27, 2009	Kitt Peak	Spacewatch	·	780 m	MPC · JPL
621579	2009 QJ_{63}	—	August 16, 2009	Kitt Peak	Spacewatch	·	1.1 km	MPC · JPL
621580	2009 QT_{64}	—	August 19, 2009	La Sagra	OAM	MAS	570 m	MPC · JPL
621581	2009 QM_{66}	—	August 17, 2009	Kitt Peak	Spacewatch	MAS	610 m	MPC · JPL
621582	2009 QA_{67}	—	July 14, 2013	Haleakala	Pan-STARRS 1	·	1.0 km	MPC · JPL
621583	2009 QH_{71}	—	August 27, 2009	Kitt Peak	Spacewatch	·	650 m	MPC · JPL
621584	2009 QK_{73}	—	August 16, 2009	Kitt Peak	Spacewatch	NYS	980 m	MPC · JPL
621585	2009 QE_{78}	—	August 27, 2009	Kitt Peak	Spacewatch	·	770 m	MPC · JPL
621586	2009 RC_{11}	—	July 11, 2005	Kitt Peak	Spacewatch	MAS	520 m	MPC · JPL
621587	2009 RO_{14}	—	September 12, 2009	Kitt Peak	Spacewatch	NYS	970 m	MPC · JPL
621588	2009 RH_{38}	—	September 15, 2009	Kitt Peak	Spacewatch	PHO	580 m	MPC · JPL
621589	2009 RY_{54}	—	September 15, 2009	Kitt Peak	Spacewatch	MAS	510 m	MPC · JPL
621590	2009 RD_{76}	—	September 15, 2009	Kitt Peak	Spacewatch	·	730 m	MPC · JPL
621591	2009 SD_{12}	—	August 27, 2009	Kitt Peak	Spacewatch	·	670 m	MPC · JPL
621592	2009 SF_{14}	—	August 3, 2016	Haleakala	Pan-STARRS 1	·	790 m	MPC · JPL
621593	2009 SR_{24}	—	September 16, 2009	Kitt Peak	Spacewatch	·	2.1 km	MPC · JPL
621594	2009 SA_{30}	—	September 16, 2009	Kitt Peak	Spacewatch	·	720 m	MPC · JPL
621595	2009 SE_{45}	—	September 16, 2009	Kitt Peak	Spacewatch	EOS	1.8 km	MPC · JPL
621596	2009 SJ_{51}	—	September 17, 2009	Mount Lemmon	Mount Lemmon Survey	·	900 m	MPC · JPL
621597	2009 SH_{57}	—	September 17, 2009	Kitt Peak	Spacewatch	URS	2.4 km	MPC · JPL
621598	2009 SY_{84}	—	September 18, 2009	Mount Lemmon	Mount Lemmon Survey	·	1.3 km	MPC · JPL
621599	2009 SB_{93}	—	August 18, 2009	Catalina	CSS	·	880 m	MPC · JPL
621600	2009 SE_{117}	—	September 18, 2009	Kitt Peak	Spacewatch	·	940 m	MPC · JPL

== 621601–621700 ==
back to top

Designation			Discovery			Properties		Ref
Permanent	Provisional	Named after	Date	Site	Discoverer(s)	Category	Diam.	Ref
621601	2009 SA_{124}	—	September 18, 2009	Kitt Peak	Spacewatch	·	980 m	MPC · JPL
621602	2009 SN_{133}	—	September 18, 2009	Kitt Peak	Spacewatch	T_{j} (2.97) · 3:2	3.9 km	MPC · JPL
621603	2009 SM_{153}	—	September 12, 2009	Kitt Peak	Spacewatch	·	800 m	MPC · JPL
621604	2009 SH_{159}	—	September 20, 2009	Kitt Peak	Spacewatch	·	960 m	MPC · JPL
621605	2009 SS_{159}	—	September 20, 2009	Kitt Peak	Spacewatch	·	590 m	MPC · JPL
621606	2009 SA_{167}	—	September 22, 2009	Kitt Peak	Spacewatch	·	1.4 km	MPC · JPL
621607	2009 SG_{173}	—	September 18, 2009	Kitt Peak	Spacewatch	(43176)	2.5 km	MPC · JPL
621608	2009 SF_{176}	—	September 19, 2009	Mount Lemmon	Mount Lemmon Survey	·	2.0 km	MPC · JPL
621609	2009 SX_{189}	—	September 18, 2009	Kitt Peak	Spacewatch	·	880 m	MPC · JPL
621610	2009 SB_{193}	—	September 22, 2009	Kitt Peak	Spacewatch	·	910 m	MPC · JPL
621611	2009 SB_{194}	—	September 22, 2009	Kitt Peak	Spacewatch	BRA	980 m	MPC · JPL
621612	2009 SR_{204}	—	September 22, 2009	Kitt Peak	Spacewatch	·	870 m	MPC · JPL
621613	2009 SU_{204}	—	September 22, 2009	Kitt Peak	Spacewatch	·	1.5 km	MPC · JPL
621614	2009 SO_{210}	—	September 15, 2009	Kitt Peak	Spacewatch	·	700 m	MPC · JPL
621615	2009 SF_{216}	—	September 24, 2009	Kitt Peak	Spacewatch	·	710 m	MPC · JPL
621616	2009 ST_{221}	—	September 25, 2009	Mount Lemmon	Mount Lemmon Survey	·	1.6 km	MPC · JPL
621617	2009 SG_{226}	—	September 26, 2009	Mount Lemmon	Mount Lemmon Survey	·	950 m	MPC · JPL
621618	2009 SW_{228}	—	September 27, 2009	Mount Lemmon	Mount Lemmon Survey	·	1.0 km	MPC · JPL
621619	2009 SP_{229}	—	September 16, 2009	Kitt Peak	Spacewatch	PHO	550 m	MPC · JPL
621620	2009 SR_{244}	—	August 27, 2005	Kitt Peak	Spacewatch	·	1.0 km	MPC · JPL
621621	2009 SE_{249}	—	September 17, 2009	Kitt Peak	Spacewatch	·	1.4 km	MPC · JPL
621622	2009 SE_{266}	—	July 30, 2005	Palomar	NEAT	·	950 m	MPC · JPL
621623	2009 SG_{269}	—	August 29, 2009	Catalina	CSS	·	840 m	MPC · JPL
621624	2009 SS_{271}	—	September 16, 2009	Kitt Peak	Spacewatch	·	630 m	MPC · JPL
621625	2009 SP_{277}	—	August 1, 2009	Kitt Peak	Spacewatch	·	1.6 km	MPC · JPL
621626	2009 SX_{289}	—	September 17, 2009	Kitt Peak	Spacewatch	·	2.2 km	MPC · JPL
621627	2009 SJ_{298}	—	September 29, 2009	Kitt Peak	Spacewatch	·	1.5 km	MPC · JPL
621628	2009 SQ_{317}	—	September 19, 2009	Kitt Peak	Spacewatch	·	790 m	MPC · JPL
621629	2009 SC_{331}	—	August 16, 2009	Kitt Peak	Spacewatch	·	660 m	MPC · JPL
621630	2009 SR_{331}	—	September 19, 2009	Mount Lemmon	Mount Lemmon Survey	·	740 m	MPC · JPL
621631	2009 SY_{341}	—	September 16, 2009	Kitt Peak	Spacewatch	·	940 m	MPC · JPL
621632	2009 SH_{345}	—	September 18, 2009	Kitt Peak	Spacewatch	THM	1.5 km	MPC · JPL
621633	2009 SF_{363}	—	September 16, 2009	Kitt Peak	Spacewatch	·	730 m	MPC · JPL
621634	2009 SA_{372}	—	September 16, 2009	Kitt Peak	Spacewatch	V	420 m	MPC · JPL
621635	2009 SV_{384}	—	January 4, 2016	Haleakala	Pan-STARRS 1	BRA	1.1 km	MPC · JPL
621636	2009 SC_{390}	—	August 28, 2014	Haleakala	Pan-STARRS 1	·	1.2 km	MPC · JPL
621637	2009 SL_{390}	—	December 14, 2010	Mount Lemmon	Mount Lemmon Survey	·	2.2 km	MPC · JPL
621638	2009 SM_{390}	—	September 21, 2009	Mount Lemmon	Mount Lemmon Survey	NYS	700 m	MPC · JPL
621639	2009 SU_{394}	—	September 28, 2009	Kitt Peak	Spacewatch	·	1.9 km	MPC · JPL
621640	2009 SJ_{399}	—	September 19, 2009	Mount Lemmon	Mount Lemmon Survey	V	410 m	MPC · JPL
621641	2009 ST_{404}	—	September 21, 2009	Kitt Peak	Spacewatch	·	2.4 km	MPC · JPL
621642	2009 SU_{406}	—	September 29, 2009	Mount Lemmon	Mount Lemmon Survey	·	930 m	MPC · JPL
621643	2009 SH_{408}	—	August 30, 2005	Kitt Peak	Spacewatch	·	900 m	MPC · JPL
621644	2009 TS_{24}	—	September 18, 2009	Kitt Peak	Spacewatch	·	770 m	MPC · JPL
621645	2009 TO_{53}	—	October 14, 2009	Mount Lemmon	Mount Lemmon Survey	·	1.5 km	MPC · JPL
621646	2009 TS_{54}	—	October 14, 2009	XuYi	PMO NEO Survey Program	MAS	620 m	MPC · JPL
621647	2009 UQ_{22}	—	October 17, 2009	Mount Lemmon	Mount Lemmon Survey	·	2.0 km	MPC · JPL
621648	2009 UK_{31}	—	October 18, 2009	Mount Lemmon	Mount Lemmon Survey	NYS	690 m	MPC · JPL
621649	2009 UP_{66}	—	October 17, 2009	Mount Lemmon	Mount Lemmon Survey	EOS	1.3 km	MPC · JPL
621650	2009 UU_{67}	—	September 21, 2009	Kitt Peak	Spacewatch	·	690 m	MPC · JPL
621651	2009 UU_{80}	—	October 22, 2009	Catalina	CSS	·	1.0 km	MPC · JPL
621652	2009 UQ_{93}	—	October 22, 2009	Mount Lemmon	Mount Lemmon Survey	·	960 m	MPC · JPL
621653	2009 UQ_{119}	—	October 14, 2009	Mount Lemmon	Mount Lemmon Survey	MAS	530 m	MPC · JPL
621654	2009 UU_{124}	—	September 13, 2005	Kitt Peak	Spacewatch	·	1.0 km	MPC · JPL
621655	2009 UV_{128}	—	October 29, 2009	Bisei	BATTeRS	·	1.1 km	MPC · JPL
621656	2009 UP_{159}	—	October 23, 2009	Kitt Peak	Spacewatch	EOS	1.4 km	MPC · JPL
621657	2009 UY_{165}	—	September 16, 2009	Mount Lemmon	Mount Lemmon Survey	·	730 m	MPC · JPL
621658	2009 UY_{166}	—	October 16, 2009	Mount Lemmon	Mount Lemmon Survey	·	680 m	MPC · JPL
621659	2009 UC_{167}	—	September 22, 2009	Mount Lemmon	Mount Lemmon Survey	·	1.4 km	MPC · JPL
621660	2009 US_{170}	—	October 23, 2009	Mount Lemmon	Mount Lemmon Survey	EOS	1.5 km	MPC · JPL
621661	2009 UO_{172}	—	June 7, 2013	Haleakala	Pan-STARRS 1	·	1.3 km	MPC · JPL
621662	2009 VC_{30}	—	November 9, 2009	Mount Lemmon	Mount Lemmon Survey	·	2.0 km	MPC · JPL
621663	2009 VW_{40}	—	November 10, 2009	Cerro Burek	Burek, Cerro	BAR	850 m	MPC · JPL
621664	2009 VW_{108}	—	October 23, 2009	Mount Lemmon	Mount Lemmon Survey	·	2.0 km	MPC · JPL
621665	2009 VX_{119}	—	November 9, 2009	Catalina	CSS	PHO	620 m	MPC · JPL
621666	2009 VE_{121}	—	November 6, 2009	Catalina	CSS	PHO	900 m	MPC · JPL
621667	2009 VT_{127}	—	November 9, 2009	Kitt Peak	Spacewatch	·	910 m	MPC · JPL
621668	2009 WH_{7}	—	November 10, 2009	Catalina	CSS	PHO	930 m	MPC · JPL
621669	2009 WZ_{10}	—	November 19, 2009	Mount Lemmon	Mount Lemmon Survey	·	1.7 km	MPC · JPL
621670	2009 WX_{13}	—	November 16, 2009	Mount Lemmon	Mount Lemmon Survey	·	930 m	MPC · JPL
621671	2009 WD_{21}	—	August 25, 2005	Palomar	NEAT	NYS	970 m	MPC · JPL
621672	2009 WS_{22}	—	November 18, 2009	Mount Lemmon	Mount Lemmon Survey	·	1.2 km	MPC · JPL
621673	2009 WU_{22}	—	November 18, 2009	Mount Lemmon	Mount Lemmon Survey	V	540 m	MPC · JPL
621674	2009 WW_{38}	—	November 8, 2009	Kitt Peak	Spacewatch	EOS	1.6 km	MPC · JPL
621675	2009 WO_{55}	—	August 6, 2005	Palomar	NEAT	·	820 m	MPC · JPL
621676	2009 WJ_{66}	—	October 23, 2009	Mount Lemmon	Mount Lemmon Survey	MAS	500 m	MPC · JPL
621677	2009 WT_{92}	—	July 30, 2008	Siding Spring	SSS	TIR	2.6 km	MPC · JPL
621678	2009 WD_{102}	—	December 13, 2004	Kitt Peak	Spacewatch	·	2.7 km	MPC · JPL
621679	2009 WM_{109}	—	November 17, 2009	Mount Lemmon	Mount Lemmon Survey	·	2.1 km	MPC · JPL
621680	2009 WG_{113}	—	September 25, 2009	Kitt Peak	Spacewatch	·	890 m	MPC · JPL
621681	2009 WV_{140}	—	November 18, 2009	Mount Lemmon	Mount Lemmon Survey	·	1.9 km	MPC · JPL
621682	2009 WP_{142}	—	October 26, 2009	Mount Lemmon	Mount Lemmon Survey	PHO	880 m	MPC · JPL
621683	2009 WT_{149}	—	October 14, 2009	Mount Lemmon	Mount Lemmon Survey	EOS	1.5 km	MPC · JPL
621684	2009 WZ_{149}	—	November 19, 2009	Mount Lemmon	Mount Lemmon Survey	·	1.7 km	MPC · JPL
621685	2009 WK_{160}	—	October 14, 2009	Catalina	CSS	·	1.1 km	MPC · JPL
621686	2009 WM_{179}	—	November 23, 2009	Kitt Peak	Spacewatch	TIR	2.9 km	MPC · JPL
621687	2009 WA_{229}	—	November 17, 2009	Mount Lemmon	Mount Lemmon Survey	·	2.5 km	MPC · JPL
621688	2009 WP_{235}	—	September 28, 2003	Kitt Peak	Spacewatch	EOS	1.3 km	MPC · JPL
621689	2009 WR_{244}	—	November 30, 2003	Kitt Peak	Spacewatch	VER	2.4 km	MPC · JPL
621690	2009 WP_{261}	—	November 16, 2009	Socorro	LINEAR	·	2.6 km	MPC · JPL
621691	2009 WF_{266}	—	October 23, 2009	Mount Lemmon	Mount Lemmon Survey	MAS	560 m	MPC · JPL
621692	2009 WD_{272}	—	January 5, 2014	Kitt Peak	Spacewatch	·	1.4 km	MPC · JPL
621693	2009 WQ_{278}	—	July 5, 2003	Kitt Peak	Spacewatch	·	1.8 km	MPC · JPL
621694	2009 WX_{278}	—	October 18, 2003	Apache Point	SDSS Collaboration	·	1.8 km	MPC · JPL
621695	2009 WQ_{281}	—	October 24, 2009	Kitt Peak	Spacewatch	·	1.7 km	MPC · JPL
621696	2009 WN_{282}	—	January 31, 2017	Haleakala	Pan-STARRS 1	·	2.9 km	MPC · JPL
621697	2009 WP_{290}	—	November 20, 2009	Kitt Peak	Spacewatch	·	2.6 km	MPC · JPL
621698	2009 WY_{290}	—	November 23, 2009	Mount Lemmon	Mount Lemmon Survey	·	1.6 km	MPC · JPL
621699	2009 YP_{29}	—	January 18, 2016	Haleakala	Pan-STARRS 1	·	2.2 km	MPC · JPL
621700	2010 AU_{154}	—	September 22, 2012	Mount Lemmon	Mount Lemmon Survey	·	1.3 km	MPC · JPL

== 621701–621800 ==
back to top

Designation			Discovery			Properties		Ref
Permanent	Provisional	Named after	Date	Site	Discoverer(s)	Category	Diam.	Ref
621701	2010 AV_{163}	—	January 12, 2010	Kitt Peak	Spacewatch	·	3.0 km	MPC · JPL
621702	2010 BT_{1}	—	January 18, 2010	Dauban	C. Rinner, Kugel, F.	·	900 m	MPC · JPL
621703	2010 CT_{29}	—	January 26, 2006	Kitt Peak	Spacewatch	·	1.1 km	MPC · JPL
621704	2010 CR_{56}	—	February 12, 2010	Socorro	LINEAR	·	1.0 km	MPC · JPL
621705	2010 CF_{67}	—	December 21, 2005	Kitt Peak	Spacewatch	NYS	850 m	MPC · JPL
621706	2010 CN_{112}	—	September 6, 2008	Mount Lemmon	Mount Lemmon Survey	V	620 m	MPC · JPL
621707	2010 CF_{154}	—	February 15, 2010	Kitt Peak	Spacewatch	·	1.2 km	MPC · JPL
621708	2010 DQ_{43}	—	February 17, 2010	Kitt Peak	Spacewatch	·	1.1 km	MPC · JPL
621709	2010 DP_{96}	—	June 28, 2015	Haleakala	Pan-STARRS 1	·	1.8 km	MPC · JPL
621710	2010 DR_{109}	—	May 16, 2012	Haleakala	Pan-STARRS 1	·	2.2 km	MPC · JPL
621711	2010 DM_{113}	—	March 3, 2016	Mount Lemmon	Mount Lemmon Survey	·	3.2 km	MPC · JPL
621712	2010 EE_{98}	—	June 2, 2002	Palomar	NEAT	·	1.2 km	MPC · JPL
621713	2010 FM_{91}	—	March 16, 2010	Mount Lemmon	Mount Lemmon Survey	·	1.5 km	MPC · JPL
621714	2010 FB_{131}	—	August 24, 2012	Kitt Peak	Spacewatch	L5	7.9 km	MPC · JPL
621715	2010 FW_{141}	—	March 10, 2014	Kitt Peak	Spacewatch	·	780 m	MPC · JPL
621716	2010 FK_{143}	—	March 19, 2010	Mount Lemmon	Mount Lemmon Survey	·	1.4 km	MPC · JPL
621717	2010 GT_{97}	—	April 8, 2010	Kitt Peak	Spacewatch	EUN	980 m	MPC · JPL
621718	2010 GC_{191}	—	May 20, 2015	Cerro Tololo	DECam	·	750 m	MPC · JPL
621719	2010 GM_{199}	—	April 10, 2010	Mount Lemmon	Mount Lemmon Survey	·	500 m	MPC · JPL
621720	2010 GB_{205}	—	February 6, 2014	Mount Lemmon	Mount Lemmon Survey	JUN	740 m	MPC · JPL
621721	2010 GV_{205}	—	April 6, 2010	Mount Lemmon	Mount Lemmon Survey	·	430 m	MPC · JPL
621722	2010 GB_{207}	—	April 9, 2010	Kitt Peak	Spacewatch	·	1.6 km	MPC · JPL
621723	2010 HP_{79}	—	April 14, 2010	Kitt Peak	Spacewatch	·	490 m	MPC · JPL
621724	2010 JV_{43}	—	January 31, 2009	Kitt Peak	Spacewatch	·	1.8 km	MPC · JPL
621725	2010 JZ_{78}	—	May 11, 2010	Kitt Peak	Spacewatch	·	1.3 km	MPC · JPL
621726	2010 JU_{82}	—	May 13, 2010	Mount Lemmon	Mount Lemmon Survey	H	330 m	MPC · JPL
621727	2010 JD_{160}	—	May 5, 2010	Mount Lemmon	Mount Lemmon Survey	·	1.1 km	MPC · JPL
621728	2010 JY_{164}	—	October 7, 2004	Kitt Peak	Spacewatch	·	460 m	MPC · JPL
621729	2010 JN_{213}	—	June 16, 2015	Haleakala	Pan-STARRS 1	·	1.3 km	MPC · JPL
621730	2010 KZ_{7}	—	November 6, 2002	Anderson Mesa	LONEOS	·	2.2 km	MPC · JPL
621731	2010 LQ_{60}	—	April 20, 2010	Mount Lemmon	Mount Lemmon Survey	EUN	880 m	MPC · JPL
621732	2010 LO_{112}	—	June 13, 2010	Catalina	CSS	·	1.4 km	MPC · JPL
621733	2010 MB_{4}	—	June 19, 2010	Mount Lemmon	Mount Lemmon Survey	·	480 m	MPC · JPL
621734	2010 MK_{137}	—	April 13, 2013	Haleakala	Pan-STARRS 1	·	1.9 km	MPC · JPL
621735	2010 ND	—	July 3, 2010	Cerro Burek	Burek, Cerro	PHO	910 m	MPC · JPL
621736	2010 NC_{5}	—	June 19, 2010	Mount Lemmon	Mount Lemmon Survey	·	640 m	MPC · JPL
621737	2010 NP_{5}	—	July 14, 2010	La Sagra	OAM	·	1.4 km	MPC · JPL
621738	2010 NT_{128}	—	August 24, 2012	Kitt Peak	Spacewatch	ULA	2.9 km	MPC · JPL
621739	2010 NK_{132}	—	September 9, 2015	Haleakala	Pan-STARRS 1	·	1.6 km	MPC · JPL
621740	2010 NW_{133}	—	June 15, 2015	Haleakala	Pan-STARRS 1	·	1.5 km	MPC · JPL
621741	2010 OW_{151}	—	March 24, 2014	Haleakala	Pan-STARRS 1	·	1.1 km	MPC · JPL
621742	2010 PU_{10}	—	July 6, 2010	Kitt Peak	Spacewatch	·	1.1 km	MPC · JPL
621743	2010 PE_{23}	—	July 19, 2010	La Sagra	OAM	·	1.2 km	MPC · JPL
621744	2010 PJ_{74}	—	September 13, 2007	Mount Lemmon	Mount Lemmon Survey	·	530 m	MPC · JPL
621745	2010 QO_{5}	—	November 17, 2006	Mount Lemmon	Mount Lemmon Survey	·	1.5 km	MPC · JPL
621746	2010 QP_{7}	—	August 19, 2010	XuYi	PMO NEO Survey Program	·	520 m	MPC · JPL
621747	2010 QG_{8}	—	August 19, 2010	Kitt Peak	Spacewatch	·	480 m	MPC · JPL
621748	2010 RK_{2}	—	August 30, 2010	La Sagra	OAM	·	480 m	MPC · JPL
621749	2010 RJ_{5}	—	September 1, 2010	ESA OGS	ESA OGS	·	450 m	MPC · JPL
621750	2010 RO_{7}	—	March 3, 2009	Mount Lemmon	Mount Lemmon Survey	·	580 m	MPC · JPL
621751	2010 RK_{8}	—	September 2, 2010	Mount Lemmon	Mount Lemmon Survey	·	1.5 km	MPC · JPL
621752	2010 RM_{13}	—	September 1, 2010	Mount Lemmon	Mount Lemmon Survey	·	1.3 km	MPC · JPL
621753	2010 RG_{14}	—	September 1, 2010	Socorro	LINEAR	·	1.7 km	MPC · JPL
621754	2010 RO_{17}	—	May 25, 2003	Kitt Peak	Spacewatch	·	580 m	MPC · JPL
621755	2010 RN_{53}	—	September 3, 2010	Mount Lemmon	Mount Lemmon Survey	·	420 m	MPC · JPL
621756	2010 RS_{63}	—	September 6, 2010	La Sagra	OAM	·	1.9 km	MPC · JPL
621757	2010 RX_{102}	—	August 26, 2000	Cerro Tololo	Deep Ecliptic Survey	·	580 m	MPC · JPL
621758	2010 RA_{107}	—	September 19, 2001	Kitt Peak	Spacewatch	·	1.5 km	MPC · JPL
621759	2010 RM_{109}	—	September 11, 2010	Catalina	CSS	·	500 m	MPC · JPL
621760	2010 RO_{116}	—	September 11, 2010	Kitt Peak	Spacewatch	·	530 m	MPC · JPL
621761	2010 RQ_{118}	—	September 11, 2010	Kitt Peak	Spacewatch	·	1.2 km	MPC · JPL
621762	2010 RF_{123}	—	September 9, 2010	Kitt Peak	Spacewatch	·	440 m	MPC · JPL
621763	2010 RZ_{130}	—	September 10, 2010	Mount Lemmon	Mount Lemmon Survey	·	1.6 km	MPC · JPL
621764	2010 RZ_{131}	—	December 13, 2006	Mount Lemmon	Mount Lemmon Survey	·	2.0 km	MPC · JPL
621765	2010 RR_{141}	—	September 14, 2010	Kitt Peak	Spacewatch	·	1.8 km	MPC · JPL
621766	2010 RU_{144}	—	July 5, 2003	Kitt Peak	Spacewatch	·	530 m	MPC · JPL
621767	2010 RX_{146}	—	September 14, 2010	Kitt Peak	Spacewatch	·	1.5 km	MPC · JPL
621768	2010 RQ_{159}	—	January 18, 2009	Mount Lemmon	Mount Lemmon Survey	·	610 m	MPC · JPL
621769	2010 RA_{163}	—	September 5, 2010	Kitt Peak	Spacewatch	·	550 m	MPC · JPL
621770	2010 RC_{169}	—	September 2, 2010	Mount Lemmon	Mount Lemmon Survey	·	440 m	MPC · JPL
621771	2010 RC_{181}	—	May 21, 2006	Kitt Peak	Spacewatch	·	440 m	MPC · JPL
621772	2010 RA_{182}	—	October 9, 2010	Catalina	CSS	·	1.6 km	MPC · JPL
621773	2010 RS_{189}	—	September 11, 2010	Mount Lemmon	Mount Lemmon Survey	·	470 m	MPC · JPL
621774	2010 RX_{195}	—	June 21, 2014	Mount Lemmon	Mount Lemmon Survey	·	1.3 km	MPC · JPL
621775	2010 RD_{199}	—	January 18, 2012	Mount Lemmon	Mount Lemmon Survey	·	560 m	MPC · JPL
621776	2010 RR_{199}	—	January 3, 2017	Haleakala	Pan-STARRS 1	·	1.6 km	MPC · JPL
621777	2010 RO_{210}	—	September 15, 2010	Mount Lemmon	Mount Lemmon Survey	·	520 m	MPC · JPL
621778	2010 SL_{22}	—	September 29, 2010	Mount Lemmon	Mount Lemmon Survey	GEF	1.1 km	MPC · JPL
621779	2010 SP_{22}	—	September 17, 2010	Mount Lemmon	Mount Lemmon Survey	·	1.4 km	MPC · JPL
621780	2010 SJ_{28}	—	September 18, 2010	Kitt Peak	Spacewatch	·	1.4 km	MPC · JPL
621781	2010 SR_{52}	—	August 8, 2005	Cerro Tololo	Deep Ecliptic Survey	KOR	1.1 km	MPC · JPL
621782	2010 TT_{11}	—	June 15, 2010	Mount Lemmon	Mount Lemmon Survey	·	1.1 km	MPC · JPL
621783	2010 TP_{25}	—	August 30, 2005	Palomar	NEAT	·	1.6 km	MPC · JPL
621784	2010 TH_{50}	—	July 4, 2014	Haleakala	Pan-STARRS 1	·	1.4 km	MPC · JPL
621785	2010 TX_{63}	—	October 7, 2010	Kitt Peak	Spacewatch	·	1.4 km	MPC · JPL
621786	2010 TK_{71}	—	September 14, 2010	Kitt Peak	Spacewatch	·	1.3 km	MPC · JPL
621787	2010 TP_{75}	—	August 27, 2005	Palomar	NEAT	·	1.4 km	MPC · JPL
621788	2010 TO_{100}	—	October 1, 2010	Kitt Peak	Spacewatch	·	1.3 km	MPC · JPL
621789	2010 TO_{136}	—	August 28, 2005	Kitt Peak	Spacewatch	·	1.7 km	MPC · JPL
621790	2010 TK_{147}	—	April 30, 2009	Mount Lemmon	Mount Lemmon Survey	TIN	850 m	MPC · JPL
621791	2010 TL_{169}	—	October 11, 2010	Mount Lemmon	Mount Lemmon Survey	·	550 m	MPC · JPL
621792	2010 TQ_{171}	—	October 13, 2010	Catalina	CSS	·	1.6 km	MPC · JPL
621793	2010 TM_{174}	—	October 11, 2010	Catalina	CSS	·	1.6 km	MPC · JPL
621794	2010 TW_{174}	—	July 18, 2005	Palomar	NEAT	AEO	1.2 km	MPC · JPL
621795	2010 TQ_{205}	—	October 11, 2010	Piszkés-tető	K. Sárneczky, G. Mező	H	390 m	MPC · JPL
621796	2010 TW_{208}	—	August 20, 2014	Haleakala	Pan-STARRS 1	·	1.7 km	MPC · JPL
621797	2010 TX_{211}	—	October 1, 2010	Mount Lemmon	Mount Lemmon Survey	·	470 m	MPC · JPL
621798	2010 TW_{217}	—	October 13, 2010	Mount Lemmon	Mount Lemmon Survey	·	520 m	MPC · JPL
621799	2010 UN_{54}	—	September 16, 2010	Mount Lemmon	Mount Lemmon Survey	·	1.3 km	MPC · JPL
621800	2010 UN_{73}	—	October 29, 2010	Mount Lemmon	Mount Lemmon Survey	·	730 m	MPC · JPL

== 621801–621900 ==
back to top

Designation			Discovery			Properties		Ref
Permanent	Provisional	Named after	Date	Site	Discoverer(s)	Category	Diam.	Ref
621801	2010 UA_{106}	—	November 3, 2010	Mount Lemmon	Mount Lemmon Survey	·	1.4 km	MPC · JPL
621802	2010 UO_{110}	—	October 17, 2010	Kitt Peak	Spacewatch	V	400 m	MPC · JPL
621803	2010 UR_{122}	—	October 30, 2010	Mount Lemmon	Mount Lemmon Survey	·	710 m	MPC · JPL
621804	2010 VM_{3}	—	November 1, 2010	Mount Lemmon	Mount Lemmon Survey	·	1.4 km	MPC · JPL
621805	2010 VM_{38}	—	November 5, 2010	La Sagra	OAM	H	390 m	MPC · JPL
621806	2010 VH_{77}	—	November 2, 2010	Mount Lemmon	Mount Lemmon Survey	·	1.4 km	MPC · JPL
621807	2010 VX_{89}	—	September 25, 2005	Kitt Peak	Spacewatch	MRX	940 m	MPC · JPL
621808	2010 VX_{164}	—	October 13, 2001	Palomar	NEAT	·	1.7 km	MPC · JPL
621809	2010 VE_{169}	—	November 10, 2010	Mount Lemmon	Mount Lemmon Survey	·	540 m	MPC · JPL
621810	2010 VR_{174}	—	November 11, 2010	Kitt Peak	Spacewatch	·	520 m	MPC · JPL
621811	2010 VU_{174}	—	June 27, 2001	Palomar	NEAT	·	1.3 km	MPC · JPL
621812	2010 VX_{203}	—	September 7, 2010	Piszkés-tető	K. Sárneczky, Z. Kuli	·	1.7 km	MPC · JPL
621813	2010 VY_{211}	—	April 11, 2005	Kitt Peak	Deep Ecliptic Survey	·	740 m	MPC · JPL
621814	2010 VP_{244}	—	October 10, 2015	Haleakala	Pan-STARRS 1	KOR	1.0 km	MPC · JPL
621815	2010 VG_{250}	—	November 14, 2010	Mount Lemmon	Mount Lemmon Survey	·	480 m	MPC · JPL
621816	2010 VX_{255}	—	November 13, 2010	Mount Lemmon	Mount Lemmon Survey	EOS	1.2 km	MPC · JPL
621817	2010 WR_{50}	—	November 28, 2010	Kitt Peak	Spacewatch	·	1.9 km	MPC · JPL
621818	2010 WD_{54}	—	November 2, 2010	Kitt Peak	Spacewatch	T_{j} (2.97) · 3:2	4.9 km	MPC · JPL
621819	2010 WU_{62}	—	October 20, 2003	Kitt Peak	Spacewatch	·	500 m	MPC · JPL
621820	2010 WE_{71}	—	November 30, 2010	Mount Lemmon	Mount Lemmon Survey	·	2.0 km	MPC · JPL
621821	2010 XK_{8}	—	December 2, 2010	Mount Lemmon	Mount Lemmon Survey	·	890 m	MPC · JPL
621822	2010 XJ_{14}	—	September 1, 2005	Kitt Peak	Spacewatch	·	1.2 km	MPC · JPL
621823	2010 XU_{53}	—	October 7, 1996	Kitt Peak	Spacewatch	·	1.5 km	MPC · JPL
621824	2010 XL_{59}	—	December 8, 2010	Kitt Peak	Spacewatch	·	580 m	MPC · JPL
621825	2010 XZ_{70}	—	November 13, 2010	Mount Lemmon	Mount Lemmon Survey	·	1.4 km	MPC · JPL
621826	2010 XF_{76}	—	December 3, 2010	Mount Lemmon	Mount Lemmon Survey	·	790 m	MPC · JPL
621827	2010 XD_{97}	—	March 27, 2012	Mount Lemmon	Mount Lemmon Survey	·	2.0 km	MPC · JPL
621828	2010 XQ_{97}	—	June 27, 2014	Haleakala	Pan-STARRS 1	·	1.6 km	MPC · JPL
621829	2010 XA_{107}	—	December 14, 2010	Mount Lemmon	Mount Lemmon Survey	·	1.3 km	MPC · JPL
621830	2010 XA_{110}	—	December 5, 2010	Mount Lemmon	Mount Lemmon Survey	·	2.3 km	MPC · JPL
621831	2010 XV_{115}	—	December 2, 2010	Mount Lemmon	Mount Lemmon Survey	EOS	1.4 km	MPC · JPL
621832	2010 YL_{6}	—	May 16, 2013	Mount Lemmon	Mount Lemmon Survey	·	1.7 km	MPC · JPL
621833	2011 AW_{14}	—	January 8, 2011	Mount Lemmon	Mount Lemmon Survey	·	2.2 km	MPC · JPL
621834	2011 AO_{71}	—	January 14, 2011	Mount Lemmon	Mount Lemmon Survey	·	2.4 km	MPC · JPL
621835	2011 AU_{85}	—	January 11, 2011	Mount Lemmon	Mount Lemmon Survey	·	2.4 km	MPC · JPL
621836	2011 AY_{89}	—	February 27, 2012	Haleakala	Pan-STARRS 1	EOS	1.6 km	MPC · JPL
621837	2011 AU_{91}	—	August 23, 2014	Haleakala	Pan-STARRS 1	EOS	1.2 km	MPC · JPL
621838	2011 AN_{99}	—	January 14, 2011	Mount Lemmon	Mount Lemmon Survey	MAS	550 m	MPC · JPL
621839	2011 AX_{99}	—	January 14, 2011	Mount Lemmon	Mount Lemmon Survey	EOS	1.4 km	MPC · JPL
621840	2011 AA_{104}	—	January 5, 2011	Mount Lemmon	Mount Lemmon Survey	H	480 m	MPC · JPL
621841	2011 BC_{29}	—	January 26, 2011	Mount Lemmon	Mount Lemmon Survey	·	810 m	MPC · JPL
621842	2011 BW_{80}	—	December 8, 2010	Mount Lemmon	Mount Lemmon Survey	·	2.1 km	MPC · JPL
621843	2011 BE_{87}	—	January 14, 2011	Kitt Peak	Spacewatch	·	680 m	MPC · JPL
621844	2011 BC_{128}	—	January 28, 2011	Mount Lemmon	Mount Lemmon Survey	·	1.1 km	MPC · JPL
621845	2011 BS_{136}	—	January 15, 2011	Mount Lemmon	Mount Lemmon Survey	·	1.0 km	MPC · JPL
621846	2011 BS_{153}	—	February 2, 2011	Kitt Peak	Spacewatch	NYS	790 m	MPC · JPL
621847	2011 BV_{181}	—	October 29, 2014	Haleakala	Pan-STARRS 1	·	1.6 km	MPC · JPL
621848	2011 BJ_{194}	—	January 28, 2011	Mount Lemmon	Mount Lemmon Survey	·	2.0 km	MPC · JPL
621849	2011 BA_{199}	—	January 28, 2011	Mount Lemmon	Mount Lemmon Survey	PHO	750 m	MPC · JPL
621850	2011 CO_{13}	—	February 5, 2011	Mount Lemmon	Mount Lemmon Survey	·	1.9 km	MPC · JPL
621851	2011 CX_{20}	—	January 27, 2011	Mount Lemmon	Mount Lemmon Survey	H	530 m	MPC · JPL
621852	2011 CM_{93}	—	March 2, 2011	Mount Lemmon	Mount Lemmon Survey	EOS	1.6 km	MPC · JPL
621853	2011 CJ_{96}	—	February 5, 2011	Haleakala	Pan-STARRS 1	V	460 m	MPC · JPL
621854	2011 CW_{100}	—	February 5, 2011	Haleakala	Pan-STARRS 1	·	1.0 km	MPC · JPL
621855	2011 CS_{124}	—	February 26, 2011	Mount Lemmon	Mount Lemmon Survey	·	810 m	MPC · JPL
621856	2011 CL_{146}	—	February 7, 2011	Mount Lemmon	Mount Lemmon Survey	EOS	1.3 km	MPC · JPL
621857	2011 DC_{22}	—	February 26, 2011	Mount Lemmon	Mount Lemmon Survey	·	3.3 km	MPC · JPL
621858	2011 DY_{53}	—	February 25, 2011	Mount Lemmon	Mount Lemmon Survey	THM	1.7 km	MPC · JPL
621859	2011 EF_{5}	—	March 1, 2011	Mount Lemmon	Mount Lemmon Survey	MAS	560 m	MPC · JPL
621860	2011 EB_{71}	—	March 1, 2011	Catalina	CSS	PHO	860 m	MPC · JPL
621861	2011 EY_{90}	—	March 11, 2011	Haleakala	Pan-STARRS 1	twotino	155 km	MPC · JPL
621862	2011 FJ_{116}	—	April 2, 2011	Mount Lemmon	Mount Lemmon Survey	VER	1.9 km	MPC · JPL
621863	2011 FQ_{160}	—	March 22, 2015	Mount Lemmon	Mount Lemmon Survey	·	1.0 km	MPC · JPL
621864	2011 FQ_{165}	—	August 24, 2012	Kitt Peak	Spacewatch	·	880 m	MPC · JPL
621865	2011 GG_{92}	—	November 28, 2013	Mount Lemmon	Mount Lemmon Survey	·	800 m	MPC · JPL
621866	2011 GK_{93}	—	April 12, 2011	Mount Lemmon	Mount Lemmon Survey	·	820 m	MPC · JPL
621867	2011 GU_{93}	—	April 2, 2011	Mount Lemmon	Mount Lemmon Survey	·	2.7 km	MPC · JPL
621868	2011 HE_{43}	—	April 6, 2011	Mount Lemmon	Mount Lemmon Survey	·	2.4 km	MPC · JPL
621869	2011 HA_{106}	—	April 23, 2011	Kitt Peak	Spacewatch	·	1.3 km	MPC · JPL
621870	2011 JG_{23}	—	May 1, 2011	Haleakala	Pan-STARRS 1	·	2.3 km	MPC · JPL
621871	2011 JJ_{36}	—	November 26, 2014	Haleakala	Pan-STARRS 1	·	2.4 km	MPC · JPL
621872	2011 JP_{36}	—	May 9, 2011	Kitt Peak	Spacewatch	·	960 m	MPC · JPL
621873	2011 KY_{21}	—	May 24, 2011	Haleakala	Pan-STARRS 1	·	650 m	MPC · JPL
621874	2011 KR_{50}	—	July 24, 2003	Palomar	NEAT	·	1.0 km	MPC · JPL
621875	2011 KX_{53}	—	April 23, 2015	Haleakala	Pan-STARRS 1	·	910 m	MPC · JPL
621876	2011 KM_{54}	—	October 14, 2012	Kitt Peak	Spacewatch	·	680 m	MPC · JPL
621877	2011 LB	—	June 2, 2011	Haleakala	Pan-STARRS 1	·	860 m	MPC · JPL
621878	2011 LW_{7}	—	June 5, 2011	Kitt Peak	Spacewatch	·	720 m	MPC · JPL
621879	2011 LA_{12}	—	November 18, 2007	Kitt Peak	Spacewatch	LIX	2.9 km	MPC · JPL
621880	2011 LP_{22}	—	June 4, 2011	Mount Lemmon	Mount Lemmon Survey	·	770 m	MPC · JPL
621881	2011 LA_{31}	—	June 12, 2011	Mount Lemmon	Mount Lemmon Survey	·	1.3 km	MPC · JPL
621882	2011 LP_{32}	—	June 6, 2011	Mount Lemmon	Mount Lemmon Survey	·	740 m	MPC · JPL
621883	2011 LZ_{32}	—	March 31, 2015	Haleakala	Pan-STARRS 1	·	1.2 km	MPC · JPL
621884	2011 MS_{13}	—	April 25, 2015	Haleakala	Pan-STARRS 1	MAR	710 m	MPC · JPL
621885	2011 OB_{31}	—	July 28, 2011	Haleakala	Pan-STARRS 1	·	1.0 km	MPC · JPL
621886	2011 ON_{48}	—	September 14, 2007	Mount Lemmon	Mount Lemmon Survey	·	1.2 km	MPC · JPL
621887	2011 ON_{65}	—	July 28, 2011	Haleakala	Pan-STARRS 1	·	800 m	MPC · JPL
621888	2011 OL_{69}	—	October 22, 2016	Mount Lemmon	Mount Lemmon Survey	·	1.5 km	MPC · JPL
621889	2011 OP_{70}	—	July 26, 2011	Haleakala	Pan-STARRS 1	·	1.0 km	MPC · JPL
621890	2011 PO_{1}	—	August 4, 2011	Haleakala	Pan-STARRS 1	APO · PHA	230 m	MPC · JPL
621891	2011 PY_{1}	—	July 30, 2011	La Sagra	OAM	H	560 m	MPC · JPL
621892	2011 PE_{15}	—	August 2, 2003	Haleakala	NEAT	·	1.5 km	MPC · JPL
621893	2011 PT_{19}	—	January 22, 2013	Mount Lemmon	Mount Lemmon Survey	·	1.1 km	MPC · JPL
621894	2011 PG_{21}	—	August 2, 2011	Haleakala	Pan-STARRS 1	L5	7.5 km	MPC · JPL
621895	2011 PJ_{22}	—	August 2, 2011	Haleakala	Pan-STARRS 1	L5	6.8 km	MPC · JPL
621896	2011 PC_{23}	—	August 6, 2011	Haleakala	Pan-STARRS 1	MAR	770 m	MPC · JPL
621897	2011 QX_{1}	—	August 10, 2011	Haleakala	Pan-STARRS 1	(5)	920 m	MPC · JPL
621898	2011 QC_{6}	—	August 23, 2003	Palomar	NEAT	·	840 m	MPC · JPL
621899	2011 QV_{15}	—	August 23, 2011	Haleakala	Pan-STARRS 1	·	840 m	MPC · JPL
621900	2011 QX_{23}	—	August 5, 2011	La Sagra	OAM	·	2.0 km	MPC · JPL

== 621901–622000 ==
back to top

Designation			Discovery			Properties		Ref
Permanent	Provisional	Named after	Date	Site	Discoverer(s)	Category	Diam.	Ref
621901	2011 QX_{24}	—	August 20, 2011	Haleakala	Pan-STARRS 1	(5)	860 m	MPC · JPL
621902	2011 QL_{26}	—	October 11, 2007	Kitt Peak	Spacewatch	·	1.1 km	MPC · JPL
621903	2011 QJ_{52}	—	August 28, 2011	Haleakala	Pan-STARRS 1	·	1.1 km	MPC · JPL
621904	2011 QG_{98}	—	September 25, 2011	Les Engarouines	L. Bernasconi	MAR	990 m	MPC · JPL
621905	2011 QB_{108}	—	December 11, 2014	Mount Lemmon	Mount Lemmon Survey	L5	7.9 km	MPC · JPL
621906	2011 RD_{4}	—	November 2, 2007	Kitt Peak	Spacewatch	·	970 m	MPC · JPL
621907	2011 RH_{8}	—	September 10, 2007	Mount Lemmon	Mount Lemmon Survey	·	880 m	MPC · JPL
621908	2011 RU_{15}	—	October 4, 2007	Kitt Peak	Spacewatch	·	1.3 km	MPC · JPL
621909	2011 RK_{22}	—	September 2, 2011	Haleakala	Pan-STARRS 1	HNS	850 m	MPC · JPL
621910	2011 SJ_{7}	—	September 18, 2011	Mount Lemmon	Mount Lemmon Survey	(1547)	1.5 km	MPC · JPL
621911	2011 SB_{16}	—	September 19, 2011	Mount Lemmon	Mount Lemmon Survey	T_{j} (2.89) · APO	610 m	MPC · JPL
621912	2011 SS_{23}	—	September 19, 2011	La Sagra	OAM	·	1.4 km	MPC · JPL
621913	2011 SS_{24}	—	June 9, 2011	Haleakala	Pan-STARRS 1	·	1.3 km	MPC · JPL
621914	2011 SN_{29}	—	September 20, 2011	Kitt Peak	Spacewatch	EUN	960 m	MPC · JPL
621915	2011 SU_{35}	—	September 20, 2011	Kitt Peak	Spacewatch	·	1.0 km	MPC · JPL
621916	2011 SE_{37}	—	August 8, 2002	Palomar	NEAT	·	1.3 km	MPC · JPL
621917	2011 SQ_{57}	—	October 20, 2007	Mount Lemmon	Mount Lemmon Survey	·	1.1 km	MPC · JPL
621918	2011 SJ_{64}	—	November 16, 2003	Kitt Peak	Spacewatch	·	990 m	MPC · JPL
621919	2011 SY_{98}	—	April 9, 2010	Kitt Peak	Spacewatch	·	1.0 km	MPC · JPL
621920	2011 SX_{104}	—	November 15, 2007	Mount Lemmon	Mount Lemmon Survey	·	970 m	MPC · JPL
621921	2011 SR_{105}	—	September 2, 2011	Mayhill-ISON	L. Elenin	·	1.0 km	MPC · JPL
621922	2011 SR_{115}	—	September 21, 2011	Haleakala	Pan-STARRS 1	ADE	1.7 km	MPC · JPL
621923	2011 SH_{127}	—	September 23, 2011	Haleakala	Pan-STARRS 1	·	1.5 km	MPC · JPL
621924	2011 SD_{145}	—	September 4, 2011	Haleakala	Pan-STARRS 1	·	550 m	MPC · JPL
621925	2011 SK_{157}	—	February 27, 2009	Kitt Peak	Spacewatch	·	1.4 km	MPC · JPL
621926	2011 SX_{158}	—	October 30, 2007	Kitt Peak	Spacewatch	·	1.1 km	MPC · JPL
621927	2011 SZ_{165}	—	September 26, 2011	La Sagra	OAM	JUN	850 m	MPC · JPL
621928	2011 SQ_{191}	—	August 17, 2002	Palomar	NEAT	·	1.3 km	MPC · JPL
621929	2011 SD_{202}	—	October 11, 2007	Mount Lemmon	Mount Lemmon Survey	·	770 m	MPC · JPL
621930	2011 SU_{212}	—	August 27, 2011	Piszkéstető	K. Sárneczky	EUN	770 m	MPC · JPL
621931	2011 SH_{215}	—	July 9, 2011	Haleakala	Pan-STARRS 1	·	1.3 km	MPC · JPL
621932	2011 SD_{218}	—	September 24, 2011	Haleakala	Pan-STARRS 1	·	1.4 km	MPC · JPL
621933	2011 SP_{218}	—	September 25, 2011	Haleakala	Pan-STARRS 1	KON	1.8 km	MPC · JPL
621934	2011 SR_{219}	—	September 4, 2011	Haleakala	Pan-STARRS 1	EUN	700 m	MPC · JPL
621935	2011 SW_{254}	—	September 21, 2011	Catalina	CSS	(5)	750 m	MPC · JPL
621936	2011 SE_{258}	—	October 10, 2007	Kitt Peak	Spacewatch	·	1.2 km	MPC · JPL
621937	2011 SJ_{265}	—	September 20, 2011	Kitt Peak	Spacewatch	·	1.6 km	MPC · JPL
621938	2011 SG_{268}	—	November 8, 2007	Kitt Peak	Spacewatch	·	1.3 km	MPC · JPL
621939	2011 SC_{272}	—	September 13, 2007	Mount Lemmon	Mount Lemmon Survey	EUN	940 m	MPC · JPL
621940	2011 SY_{280}	—	September 29, 2011	Mount Lemmon	Mount Lemmon Survey	·	1.5 km	MPC · JPL
621941	2011 SC_{289}	—	September 24, 2011	Mount Lemmon	Mount Lemmon Survey	·	1.8 km	MPC · JPL
621942	2011 SE_{309}	—	September 24, 2011	Kitt Peak	Spacewatch	·	970 m	MPC · JPL
621943	2011 SO_{319}	—	September 23, 2011	Haleakala	Pan-STARRS 1	HOF	2.2 km	MPC · JPL
621944	2011 TL_{7}	—	September 30, 2011	Kitt Peak	Spacewatch	·	1.3 km	MPC · JPL
621945	2011 UQ_{6}	—	April 21, 2009	Kitt Peak	Spacewatch	·	1.8 km	MPC · JPL
621946	2011 UL_{19}	—	October 19, 2011	Mount Lemmon	Mount Lemmon Survey	·	1.4 km	MPC · JPL
621947	2011 UU_{35}	—	October 19, 2011	Mount Lemmon	Mount Lemmon Survey	·	1.5 km	MPC · JPL
621948	2011 UF_{46}	—	September 3, 2002	Palomar	NEAT	·	2.5 km	MPC · JPL
621949	2011 UP_{50}	—	October 18, 2011	Kitt Peak	Spacewatch	JUN	700 m	MPC · JPL
621950	2011 UD_{52}	—	October 18, 2011	Kitt Peak	Spacewatch	·	1.3 km	MPC · JPL
621951	2011 UV_{55}	—	September 24, 2011	Mount Lemmon	Mount Lemmon Survey	·	1.5 km	MPC · JPL
621952	2011 UB_{80}	—	November 19, 2007	Kitt Peak	Spacewatch	·	1.4 km	MPC · JPL
621953	2011 UY_{85}	—	September 28, 2011	Kitt Peak	Spacewatch	·	950 m	MPC · JPL
621954	2011 UY_{88}	—	August 3, 2002	Palomar	NEAT	JUN	850 m	MPC · JPL
621955	2011 UC_{110}	—	October 19, 2011	Haleakala	Pan-STARRS 1	·	1.7 km	MPC · JPL
621956	2011 UF_{112}	—	October 9, 2007	Mount Lemmon	Mount Lemmon Survey	EUN	720 m	MPC · JPL
621957	2011 UN_{114}	—	October 18, 2011	Mount Lemmon	Mount Lemmon Survey	·	640 m	MPC · JPL
621958	2011 UU_{124}	—	October 19, 2011	Mount Lemmon	Mount Lemmon Survey	·	1.1 km	MPC · JPL
621959	2011 UL_{141}	—	September 28, 2011	Kitt Peak	Spacewatch	ADE	1.3 km	MPC · JPL
621960	2011 UL_{149}	—	November 18, 2007	Kitt Peak	Spacewatch	·	920 m	MPC · JPL
621961	2011 UW_{188}	—	October 26, 2011	Haleakala	Pan-STARRS 1	EUN	1.1 km	MPC · JPL
621962	2011 UG_{190}	—	January 17, 2004	Palomar	NEAT	·	2.4 km	MPC · JPL
621963	2011 UK_{196}	—	September 29, 2011	Mount Lemmon	Mount Lemmon Survey	(5)	980 m	MPC · JPL
621964	2011 UV_{204}	—	October 20, 2011	Catalina	CSS	·	1.9 km	MPC · JPL
621965	2011 UJ_{217}	—	October 24, 2011	Mount Lemmon	Mount Lemmon Survey	·	460 m	MPC · JPL
621966	2011 UZ_{231}	—	September 22, 2011	Kitt Peak	Spacewatch	·	500 m	MPC · JPL
621967	2011 UF_{234}	—	March 21, 2010	Mount Lemmon	Mount Lemmon Survey	·	560 m	MPC · JPL
621968	2011 UN_{245}	—	August 29, 2002	Palomar	NEAT	·	1.5 km	MPC · JPL
621969	2011 UD_{250}	—	October 26, 2011	Haleakala	Pan-STARRS 1	MAR	710 m	MPC · JPL
621970	2011 UU_{263}	—	September 24, 2011	Haleakala	Pan-STARRS 1	JUN	960 m	MPC · JPL
621971	2011 UO_{280}	—	October 24, 2011	Catalina	CSS	·	2.2 km	MPC · JPL
621972	2011 UX_{285}	—	October 20, 2011	Mount Lemmon	Mount Lemmon Survey	·	1.7 km	MPC · JPL
621973	2011 UC_{286}	—	October 18, 2011	Catalina	CSS	·	1.6 km	MPC · JPL
621974	2011 UY_{287}	—	March 9, 2005	Mount Lemmon	Mount Lemmon Survey	·	1.3 km	MPC · JPL
621975	2011 UU_{288}	—	October 28, 2011	Mount Lemmon	Mount Lemmon Survey	·	1.4 km	MPC · JPL
621976	2011 UO_{298}	—	October 24, 2011	Haleakala	Pan-STARRS 1	HNS	1.5 km	MPC · JPL
621977	2011 UB_{303}	—	October 31, 2011	Mount Lemmon	Mount Lemmon Survey	·	1.6 km	MPC · JPL
621978	2011 UK_{318}	—	August 29, 2006	Kitt Peak	Spacewatch	NEM	1.6 km	MPC · JPL
621979	2011 UF_{323}	—	October 16, 2011	Kitt Peak	Spacewatch	·	1.5 km	MPC · JPL
621980	2011 UN_{329}	—	October 23, 2011	Mount Lemmon	Mount Lemmon Survey	·	1.3 km	MPC · JPL
621981	2011 UD_{336}	—	November 5, 2007	Kitt Peak	Spacewatch	·	870 m	MPC · JPL
621982	2011 UL_{338}	—	September 21, 2011	Mayhill-ISON	L. Elenin	·	990 m	MPC · JPL
621983	2011 UV_{354}	—	March 24, 2009	Kitt Peak	Spacewatch	·	1.7 km	MPC · JPL
621984	2011 UU_{357}	—	October 20, 2011	Mount Lemmon	Mount Lemmon Survey	·	460 m	MPC · JPL
621985	2011 US_{414}	—	January 13, 2008	Kitt Peak	Spacewatch	·	1.3 km	MPC · JPL
621986	2011 UZ_{414}	—	February 15, 2013	Haleakala	Pan-STARRS 1	·	1.4 km	MPC · JPL
621987	2011 UF_{416}	—	October 24, 2011	Haleakala	Pan-STARRS 1	·	1.4 km	MPC · JPL
621988	2011 UT_{421}	—	October 30, 2011	Mount Lemmon	Mount Lemmon Survey	·	590 m	MPC · JPL
621989	2011 UV_{421}	—	October 18, 2011	Mount Lemmon	Mount Lemmon Survey	·	530 m	MPC · JPL
621990	2011 UP_{426}	—	October 30, 2011	Kitt Peak	Spacewatch	·	1.1 km	MPC · JPL
621991	2011 UY_{429}	—	October 21, 2011	Mount Lemmon	Mount Lemmon Survey	·	900 m	MPC · JPL
621992	2011 UC_{438}	—	June 24, 2015	Haleakala	Pan-STARRS 1	·	1.3 km	MPC · JPL
621993	2011 UB_{441}	—	October 19, 2011	Mount Lemmon	Mount Lemmon Survey	HOF	2.1 km	MPC · JPL
621994	2011 UW_{441}	—	January 2, 2017	Oukaïmeden	M. Ory	HNS	840 m	MPC · JPL
621995	2011 UE_{445}	—	February 16, 2013	Mount Lemmon	Mount Lemmon Survey	·	1.1 km	MPC · JPL
621996	2011 UZ_{445}	—	October 19, 2011	Mount Lemmon	Mount Lemmon Survey	·	1.2 km	MPC · JPL
621997	2011 UL_{448}	—	October 24, 2011	Haleakala	Pan-STARRS 1	DOR	2.1 km	MPC · JPL
621998	2011 UP_{449}	—	October 23, 2011	Haleakala	Pan-STARRS 1	·	980 m	MPC · JPL
621999	2011 UE_{451}	—	October 26, 2011	Haleakala	Pan-STARRS 1	·	990 m	MPC · JPL
622000	2011 UU_{458}	—	October 25, 2011	Haleakala	Pan-STARRS 1	·	1.5 km	MPC · JPL

back to top
