= List of minor planets: 786001–787000 =

The following is a partial list of minor planets, running from minor-planet number 786001 through 787000, inclusive. The primary data for this and other partial lists is based on JPL's "Small-Body Orbital Elements" and data available from the Minor Planet Center. Critical list information is also provided by the MPC, unless otherwise specified from Lowell Observatory. A detailed description of the table's columns and additional sources are given on the main page including a complete list of every page in this series, and a statistical break-up on the dynamical classification of minor planets.

Also see the summary list of all named bodies in numerical and alphabetical order, and the corresponding naming citations for the number range of this particular list. New namings may only be added to this list after official publication, as the preannouncement of names is condemned by the Working Group for Small Bodies Nomenclature of the International Astronomical Union.

Near-Earth obj.	MBA (inner)	MBA (outer)	Centaur
Mars-crosser	MBA (middle)	Jupiter trojan	Trans-Neptunian obj.
Unclassified

== 786001–786100 ==
Designation			Discovery			Properties		Ref
Permanent	Provisional	Named after	Date	Site	Discoverer(s)	Category	Diam.	Ref
786001	2015 TD_{457}	—	October 13, 2015	Mount Lemmon	Mount Lemmon Survey	·	3.3 km	MPC · JPL
786002	2015 TO_{459}	—	October 10, 2015	Haleakala	Pan-STARRS 1	·	920 m	MPC · JPL
786003	2015 TD_{460}	—	October 13, 2015	Haleakala	Pan-STARRS 1	·	1.2 km	MPC · JPL
786004	2015 TK_{460}	—	October 8, 2015	Haleakala	Pan-STARRS 1	HNS	730 m	MPC · JPL
786005	2015 TL_{467}	—	October 10, 2015	Haleakala	Pan-STARRS 1	·	1.4 km	MPC · JPL
786006	2015 TT_{468}	—	October 10, 2015	Haleakala	Pan-STARRS 1	·	1.4 km	MPC · JPL
786007	2015 TD_{469}	—	October 9, 2015	Haleakala	Pan-STARRS 1	HOF	2.0 km	MPC · JPL
786008	2015 TM_{469}	—	September 9, 2015	Haleakala	Pan-STARRS 1	·	1.0 km	MPC · JPL
786009	2015 TO_{469}	—	October 12, 2015	Haleakala	Pan-STARRS 1	HNS	820 m	MPC · JPL
786010	2015 TA_{476}	—	October 1, 2015	Mount Lemmon	Mount Lemmon Survey	·	660 m	MPC · JPL
786011	2015 TW_{479}	—	October 13, 2015	Kitt Peak	Spacewatch	·	1.3 km	MPC · JPL
786012	2015 TW_{480}	—	October 10, 2015	Haleakala	Pan-STARRS 1	·	1.0 km	MPC · JPL
786013	2015 TJ_{481}	—	October 9, 2015	Haleakala	Pan-STARRS 1	·	800 m	MPC · JPL
786014	2015 TG_{488}	—	October 12, 2015	Haleakala	Pan-STARRS 1	·	900 m	MPC · JPL
786015	2015 TY_{488}	—	October 8, 2015	Haleakala	Pan-STARRS 1	·	810 m	MPC · JPL
786016	2015 TF_{498}	—	October 8, 2015	Haleakala	Pan-STARRS 1	·	840 m	MPC · JPL
786017	2015 UK_{2}	—	October 24, 2011	Haleakala	Pan-STARRS 1	(5)	670 m	MPC · JPL
786018	2015 UF_{8}	—	April 5, 2008	Mount Lemmon	Mount Lemmon Survey	·	1.3 km	MPC · JPL
786019	2015 UB_{9}	—	September 12, 2015	Haleakala	Pan-STARRS 1	·	1.2 km	MPC · JPL
786020	2015 UC_{13}	—	November 18, 2011	Mount Lemmon	Mount Lemmon Survey	·	810 m	MPC · JPL
786021	2015 UW_{13}	—	October 22, 2011	Mount Lemmon	Mount Lemmon Survey	·	760 m	MPC · JPL
786022	2015 UV_{14}	—	October 18, 2015	Haleakala	Pan-STARRS 1	·	770 m	MPC · JPL
786023	2015 UP_{15}	—	August 12, 2015	Haleakala	Pan-STARRS 1	·	1.0 km	MPC · JPL
786024	2015 UA_{16}	—	August 3, 2014	Haleakala	Pan-STARRS 1	(1298)	2.1 km	MPC · JPL
786025	2015 UQ_{18}	—	September 11, 2007	Kitt Peak	Spacewatch	3:2	3.7 km	MPC · JPL
786026	2015 UF_{19}	—	October 18, 2015	Haleakala	Pan-STARRS 1	·	1.3 km	MPC · JPL
786027	2015 UA_{22}	—	October 28, 2011	Mount Lemmon	Mount Lemmon Survey	·	810 m	MPC · JPL
786028	2015 US_{33}	—	October 16, 2015	Kitt Peak	Spacewatch	·	720 m	MPC · JPL
786029	2015 UF_{38}	—	February 21, 2009	Kitt Peak	Spacewatch	·	990 m	MPC · JPL
786030	2015 UR_{38}	—	February 16, 2001	Bergisch Gladbach	W. Bickel	·	1.8 km	MPC · JPL
786031	2015 UR_{54}	—	September 11, 2015	Haleakala	Pan-STARRS 1	·	1.3 km	MPC · JPL
786032	2015 UE_{55}	—	July 2, 2014	Haleakala	Pan-STARRS 1	·	1.4 km	MPC · JPL
786033	2015 UF_{56}	—	September 28, 2006	Kitt Peak	Spacewatch	·	1.2 km	MPC · JPL
786034	2015 UH_{56}	—	September 12, 2015	Haleakala	Pan-STARRS 1	VER	1.8 km	MPC · JPL
786035	2015 UH_{62}	—	February 4, 2006	Kitt Peak	Spacewatch	·	1.6 km	MPC · JPL
786036	2015 UN_{77}	—	November 5, 2007	Mount Lemmon	Mount Lemmon Survey	(5)	980 m	MPC · JPL
786037	2015 UT_{77}	—	October 24, 2015	Haleakala	Pan-STARRS 1	·	1.2 km	MPC · JPL
786038	2015 UC_{80}	—	December 25, 2011	Kitt Peak	Spacewatch	·	1.3 km	MPC · JPL
786039	2015 UP_{86}	—	October 16, 2015	Kitt Peak	Spacewatch	·	1.2 km	MPC · JPL
786040	2015 UY_{86}	—	October 21, 2015	Haleakala	Pan-STARRS 1	KON	1.9 km	MPC · JPL
786041	2015 UC_{88}	—	October 1, 2011	Mount Lemmon	Mount Lemmon Survey	KON	1.5 km	MPC · JPL
786042	2015 UH_{93}	—	October 24, 2015	Haleakala	Pan-STARRS 1	·	960 m	MPC · JPL
786043	2015 UP_{94}	—	April 16, 2013	Cerro Tololo-DECam	DECam	·	1.3 km	MPC · JPL
786044	2015 UC_{95}	—	October 24, 2015	Mount Lemmon	Mount Lemmon Survey	·	840 m	MPC · JPL
786045	2015 UL_{97}	—	October 23, 2015	Mount Lemmon	Mount Lemmon Survey	·	1.1 km	MPC · JPL
786046	2015 UW_{97}	—	October 25, 2015	Haleakala	Pan-STARRS 1	·	1.8 km	MPC · JPL
786047	2015 UC_{98}	—	August 29, 2009	Catalina	CSS	·	2.7 km	MPC · JPL
786048	2015 UR_{98}	—	October 23, 2015	Mount Lemmon	Mount Lemmon Survey	·	1.4 km	MPC · JPL
786049	2015 UG_{102}	—	October 23, 2015	Mount Lemmon	Mount Lemmon Survey	·	1.5 km	MPC · JPL
786050	2015 UH_{102}	—	October 23, 2015	Mount Lemmon	Mount Lemmon Survey	HOF	2.0 km	MPC · JPL
786051	2015 UX_{102}	—	October 23, 2015	Mount Lemmon	Mount Lemmon Survey	·	1.5 km	MPC · JPL
786052	2015 US_{111}	—	October 19, 2015	Haleakala	Pan-STARRS 1	·	1.9 km	MPC · JPL
786053	2015 VT_{5}	—	April 24, 2014	Cerro Tololo-DECam	DECam	(5)	860 m	MPC · JPL
786054	2015 VS_{7}	—	March 15, 2013	Mount Lemmon	Mount Lemmon Survey	·	870 m	MPC · JPL
786055	2015 VR_{8}	—	November 1, 2015	Haleakala	Pan-STARRS 1	·	1.1 km	MPC · JPL
786056	2015 VP_{9}	—	October 2, 2005	Mount Lemmon	Mount Lemmon Survey	·	1.4 km	MPC · JPL
786057	2015 VS_{10}	—	October 29, 2006	Kitt Peak	Spacewatch	GEF	730 m	MPC · JPL
786058	2015 VY_{13}	—	September 12, 2015	Haleakala	Pan-STARRS 1	·	1.3 km	MPC · JPL
786059	2015 VT_{15}	—	September 12, 2015	Haleakala	Pan-STARRS 1	AGN	830 m	MPC · JPL
786060	2015 VP_{16}	—	September 11, 2015	Haleakala	Pan-STARRS 1	·	2.3 km	MPC · JPL
786061	2015 VY_{22}	—	February 3, 2013	Haleakala	Pan-STARRS 1	·	690 m	MPC · JPL
786062	2015 VQ_{25}	—	October 18, 2006	Kitt Peak	Spacewatch	EUN	860 m	MPC · JPL
786063	2015 VL_{26}	—	October 12, 2015	XuYi	PMO NEO Survey Program	·	1.7 km	MPC · JPL
786064	2015 VV_{31}	—	November 1, 2015	Haleakala	Pan-STARRS 1	·	990 m	MPC · JPL
786065	2015 VJ_{36}	—	September 23, 2011	Mount Lemmon	Mount Lemmon Survey	·	1.0 km	MPC · JPL
786066	2015 VO_{36}	—	October 25, 2011	Haleakala	Pan-STARRS 1	·	1.1 km	MPC · JPL
786067	2015 VK_{37}	—	September 26, 2006	Catalina	CSS	·	1.3 km	MPC · JPL
786068	2015 VC_{38}	—	October 23, 2015	Mount Lemmon	Mount Lemmon Survey	·	2.3 km	MPC · JPL
786069	2015 VU_{38}	—	November 1, 2015	Haleakala	Pan-STARRS 1	·	1.8 km	MPC · JPL
786070	2015 VF_{43}	—	June 29, 2015	Haleakala	Pan-STARRS 1	DOR	1.6 km	MPC · JPL
786071	2015 VG_{49}	—	July 23, 2015	Haleakala	Pan-STARRS 1	·	2.7 km	MPC · JPL
786072	2015 VO_{52}	—	September 9, 2015	Haleakala	Pan-STARRS 1	EUN	820 m	MPC · JPL
786073	2015 VH_{54}	—	November 2, 2007	Kitt Peak	Spacewatch	KON	1.6 km	MPC · JPL
786074	2015 VY_{56}	—	November 18, 2011	Mount Lemmon	Mount Lemmon Survey	·	1.2 km	MPC · JPL
786075	2015 VC_{57}	—	September 8, 2015	Haleakala	Pan-STARRS 1	·	1.3 km	MPC · JPL
786076	2015 VV_{57}	—	October 16, 2015	Kitt Peak	Spacewatch	·	1.4 km	MPC · JPL
786077	2015 VB_{58}	—	April 10, 2013	Haleakala	Pan-STARRS 1	·	2.5 km	MPC · JPL
786078	2015 VM_{61}	—	September 9, 2007	Mount Lemmon	Mount Lemmon Survey	·	980 m	MPC · JPL
786079	2015 VO_{61}	—	January 23, 2006	Kitt Peak	Spacewatch	·	1.8 km	MPC · JPL
786080	2015 VA_{63}	—	December 25, 2011	Mount Lemmon	Mount Lemmon Survey	EUN	850 m	MPC · JPL
786081	2015 VG_{63}	—	November 26, 2011	Mount Lemmon	Mount Lemmon Survey	JUN	760 m	MPC · JPL
786082	2015 VN_{63}	—	October 9, 2015	Haleakala	Pan-STARRS 1	·	1.1 km	MPC · JPL
786083	2015 VK_{67}	—	November 2, 2015	Haleakala	Pan-STARRS 1	·	1.1 km	MPC · JPL
786084	2015 VQ_{67}	—	May 8, 2014	Haleakala	Pan-STARRS 1	·	1.6 km	MPC · JPL
786085	2015 VO_{71}	—	February 14, 2012	Haleakala	Pan-STARRS 1	·	1.3 km	MPC · JPL
786086	2015 VD_{75}	—	August 19, 2009	La Sagra	OAM	·	3.2 km	MPC · JPL
786087	2015 VW_{75}	—	October 8, 2015	Catalina	CSS	·	1.5 km	MPC · JPL
786088	2015 VN_{76}	—	October 8, 2015	Haleakala	Pan-STARRS 1	·	780 m	MPC · JPL
786089	2015 VW_{81}	—	October 10, 2015	Haleakala	Pan-STARRS 1	·	1.4 km	MPC · JPL
786090	2015 VB_{82}	—	September 9, 2015	Haleakala	Pan-STARRS 1	·	780 m	MPC · JPL
786091	2015 VO_{89}	—	September 9, 2015	Haleakala	Pan-STARRS 1	EUN	900 m	MPC · JPL
786092	2015 VB_{91}	—	October 9, 2015	Haleakala	Pan-STARRS 1	·	840 m	MPC · JPL
786093	2015 VA_{92}	—	October 8, 2015	Haleakala	Pan-STARRS 1	·	1.5 km	MPC · JPL
786094	2015 VL_{92}	—	November 2, 2015	Haleakala	Pan-STARRS 1	T_{j} (2.99) · 3:2 · SHU	2.8 km	MPC · JPL
786095	2015 VH_{93}	—	September 15, 2006	Kitt Peak	Spacewatch	·	960 m	MPC · JPL
786096	2015 VJ_{103}	—	September 9, 2015	Haleakala	Pan-STARRS 1	·	970 m	MPC · JPL
786097	2015 VY_{103}	—	November 3, 2015	Mount Lemmon	Mount Lemmon Survey	(5)	880 m	MPC · JPL
786098	2015 VD_{116}	—	September 9, 2015	Haleakala	Pan-STARRS 1	·	1.1 km	MPC · JPL
786099	2015 VM_{121}	—	September 25, 2015	Haleakala	Pan-STARRS 1	·	1.3 km	MPC · JPL
786100	2015 VQ_{130}	—	October 16, 2015	Mount Lemmon	Mount Lemmon Survey	·	1.2 km	MPC · JPL

== 786101–786200 ==
back to top

Designation			Discovery			Properties		Ref
Permanent	Provisional	Named after	Date	Site	Discoverer(s)	Category	Diam.	Ref
786101	2015 VL_{136}	—	October 8, 2007	Mount Lemmon	Mount Lemmon Survey	3:2	3.1 km	MPC · JPL
786102	2015 VB_{138}	—	October 9, 2015	Haleakala	Pan-STARRS 1	·	750 m	MPC · JPL
786103	2015 VH_{140}	—	May 7, 2014	Haleakala	Pan-STARRS 1	·	810 m	MPC · JPL
786104	2015 VP_{140}	—	November 30, 2011	Kitt Peak	Spacewatch	·	1.0 km	MPC · JPL
786105	2015 VP_{148}	—	February 28, 2008	Mount Lemmon	Mount Lemmon Survey	·	970 m	MPC · JPL
786106	2015 VP_{151}	—	September 29, 2010	Mount Lemmon	Mount Lemmon Survey	·	1.0 km	MPC · JPL
786107	2015 VG_{154}	—	November 6, 2015	Mount Lemmon	Mount Lemmon Survey	EUN	900 m	MPC · JPL
786108	2015 VA_{159}	—	November 2, 2015	Haleakala	Pan-STARRS 1	·	850 m	MPC · JPL
786109	2015 VG_{159}	—	December 28, 2011	Mount Lemmon	Mount Lemmon Survey	·	1.1 km	MPC · JPL
786110	2015 VM_{163}	—	November 23, 2011	Kitt Peak	Spacewatch	MAR	850 m	MPC · JPL
786111	2015 VB_{174}	—	November 2, 2015	Mount Lemmon	Mount Lemmon Survey	·	1.1 km	MPC · JPL
786112	2015 VC_{178}	—	November 2, 2015	Mount Lemmon	Mount Lemmon Survey	·	1.2 km	MPC · JPL
786113	2015 VD_{178}	—	November 7, 2015	Haleakala	Pan-STARRS 1	·	790 m	MPC · JPL
786114	2015 VG_{178}	—	November 7, 2015	Mount Lemmon	Mount Lemmon Survey	·	1.1 km	MPC · JPL
786115	2015 VN_{182}	—	November 3, 2015	Mount Lemmon	Mount Lemmon Survey	(5)	810 m	MPC · JPL
786116	2015 VH_{185}	—	November 14, 2015	Mount Lemmon	Mount Lemmon Survey	KON	1.7 km	MPC · JPL
786117	2015 VT_{186}	—	November 14, 2015	Mount Lemmon	Mount Lemmon Survey	·	1.5 km	MPC · JPL
786118	2015 VD_{187}	—	November 13, 2015	Mount Lemmon	Mount Lemmon Survey	·	1.4 km	MPC · JPL
786119	2015 VJ_{187}	—	November 3, 2015	Mount Lemmon	Mount Lemmon Survey	EUN	690 m	MPC · JPL
786120	2015 VM_{187}	—	November 3, 2015	Mount Lemmon	Mount Lemmon Survey	·	1.1 km	MPC · JPL
786121	2015 VK_{188}	—	November 7, 2015	Haleakala	Pan-STARRS 1	·	2.1 km	MPC · JPL
786122	2015 VW_{189}	—	November 10, 2015	Mount Lemmon	Mount Lemmon Survey	AGN	820 m	MPC · JPL
786123	2015 VU_{192}	—	November 7, 2015	Mount Lemmon	Mount Lemmon Survey	·	900 m	MPC · JPL
786124	2015 VL_{194}	—	December 1, 2011	Mount Lemmon	Mount Lemmon Survey	(5)	780 m	MPC · JPL
786125	2015 VN_{194}	—	November 7, 2015	Mount Teide	A. Knöfel	·	1.4 km	MPC · JPL
786126	2015 VD_{196}	—	November 2, 2015	Haleakala	Pan-STARRS 1	EOS	1.4 km	MPC · JPL
786127	2015 VH_{196}	—	November 7, 2015	Mount Lemmon	Mount Lemmon Survey	·	2.1 km	MPC · JPL
786128	2015 VR_{197}	—	November 14, 2015	Mount Lemmon	Mount Lemmon Survey	·	1.4 km	MPC · JPL
786129	2015 VN_{199}	—	November 8, 2015	Kitt Peak	Spacewatch	·	1.1 km	MPC · JPL
786130	2015 VV_{201}	—	November 10, 2015	Mount Lemmon	Mount Lemmon Survey	·	1.5 km	MPC · JPL
786131	2015 VW_{201}	—	November 8, 2015	Haleakala	Pan-STARRS 1	·	1.1 km	MPC · JPL
786132	2015 VU_{202}	—	November 14, 2015	Mount Lemmon	Mount Lemmon Survey	·	830 m	MPC · JPL
786133	2015 VB_{206}	—	November 14, 2015	Mount Lemmon	Mount Lemmon Survey	·	1.5 km	MPC · JPL
786134	2015 VW_{211}	—	November 13, 2015	Mount Lemmon	Mount Lemmon Survey	·	1.4 km	MPC · JPL
786135	2015 VQ_{212}	—	November 13, 2015	Kitt Peak	Spacewatch	AGN	820 m	MPC · JPL
786136	2015 VK_{213}	—	November 3, 2015	Haleakala	Pan-STARRS 1	·	1.7 km	MPC · JPL
786137	2015 VC_{217}	—	November 7, 2015	Mount Lemmon	Mount Lemmon Survey	EOS	1.4 km	MPC · JPL
786138	2015 VF_{227}	—	November 1, 2015	Haleakala	Pan-STARRS 1	·	850 m	MPC · JPL
786139	2015 WB_{2}	—	November 15, 2011	Haleakala	Pan-STARRS 1	·	1.7 km	MPC · JPL
786140	2015 WT_{3}	—	September 27, 2006	Catalina	CSS	·	1.1 km	MPC · JPL
786141	2015 WA_{4}	—	September 15, 2006	Kitt Peak	Spacewatch	·	1.0 km	MPC · JPL
786142	2015 WD_{8}	—	November 14, 2015	Mount Lemmon	Mount Lemmon Survey	·	1.1 km	MPC · JPL
786143	2015 WM_{9}	—	October 16, 2015	Mount Lemmon	Mount Lemmon Survey	·	1.1 km	MPC · JPL
786144	2015 WR_{9}	—	September 23, 2015	Haleakala	Pan-STARRS 1	·	1.2 km	MPC · JPL
786145	2015 WF_{12}	—	January 18, 2012	Kitt Peak	Spacewatch	·	1.1 km	MPC · JPL
786146	2015 WY_{12}	—	November 30, 2015	Haleakala	Pan-STARRS 1	·	1.2 km	MPC · JPL
786147	2015 WB_{18}	—	November 17, 2015	Haleakala	Pan-STARRS 1	·	1.6 km	MPC · JPL
786148	2015 WN_{19}	—	August 12, 2010	Kitt Peak	Spacewatch	·	1.4 km	MPC · JPL
786149	2015 WH_{20}	—	June 24, 2014	Haleakala	Pan-STARRS 1	HNS	690 m	MPC · JPL
786150	2015 WA_{21}	—	November 21, 2015	Mount Lemmon	Mount Lemmon Survey	·	950 m	MPC · JPL
786151	2015 WG_{21}	—	November 21, 2015	Mount Lemmon	Mount Lemmon Survey	(194)	1.6 km	MPC · JPL
786152	2015 WJ_{21}	—	November 22, 2015	Mount Lemmon	Mount Lemmon Survey	·	910 m	MPC · JPL
786153	2015 WR_{22}	—	November 18, 2015	Haleakala	Pan-STARRS 1	·	1.4 km	MPC · JPL
786154	2015 WV_{22}	—	November 22, 2015	Mount Lemmon	Mount Lemmon Survey	·	2.2 km	MPC · JPL
786155	2015 WE_{25}	—	November 20, 2015	Mount Lemmon	Mount Lemmon Survey	MAR	700 m	MPC · JPL
786156	2015 WG_{27}	—	November 22, 2015	Mount Lemmon	Mount Lemmon Survey	·	950 m	MPC · JPL
786157	2015 WH_{27}	—	November 22, 2015	Mount Lemmon	Mount Lemmon Survey	·	850 m	MPC · JPL
786158	2015 WW_{27}	—	November 18, 2015	Kitt Peak	Spacewatch	·	890 m	MPC · JPL
786159	2015 WC_{28}	—	November 21, 2015	Mount Lemmon	Mount Lemmon Survey	·	880 m	MPC · JPL
786160	2015 WR_{28}	—	November 20, 2015	Mount Lemmon	Mount Lemmon Survey	MAR	750 m	MPC · JPL
786161	2015 WK_{32}	—	November 20, 2015	Mount Lemmon	Mount Lemmon Survey	·	1.5 km	MPC · JPL
786162	2015 WL_{34}	—	November 21, 2015	Mount Lemmon	Mount Lemmon Survey	·	930 m	MPC · JPL
786163	2015 WE_{35}	—	May 5, 2008	Mount Lemmon	Mount Lemmon Survey	BRA	1.2 km	MPC · JPL
786164	2015 WY_{35}	—	November 17, 2015	Haleakala	Pan-STARRS 1	·	820 m	MPC · JPL
786165	2015 WP_{36}	—	November 19, 2015	Mount Lemmon	Mount Lemmon Survey	EUN	900 m	MPC · JPL
786166	2015 WE_{37}	—	November 21, 2015	Mount Lemmon	Mount Lemmon Survey	·	1.4 km	MPC · JPL
786167	2015 WL_{42}	—	November 21, 2015	Mount Lemmon	Mount Lemmon Survey	·	1.4 km	MPC · JPL
786168	2015 WR_{42}	—	November 22, 2015	Mount Lemmon	Mount Lemmon Survey	·	1.3 km	MPC · JPL
786169	2015 XF_{7}	—	November 13, 2015	Kitt Peak	Spacewatch	·	1.1 km	MPC · JPL
786170	2015 XB_{8}	—	June 5, 2013	Mount Lemmon	Mount Lemmon Survey	·	2.0 km	MPC · JPL
786171	2015 XP_{10}	—	December 1, 2015	Haleakala	Pan-STARRS 1	·	1.6 km	MPC · JPL
786172	2015 XR_{10}	—	November 21, 2015	Mount Lemmon	Mount Lemmon Survey	·	1.3 km	MPC · JPL
786173	2015 XM_{12}	—	December 18, 2007	Mount Lemmon	Mount Lemmon Survey	EUN	970 m	MPC · JPL
786174	2015 XA_{16}	—	September 9, 2015	Haleakala	Pan-STARRS 1	KOR	1.1 km	MPC · JPL
786175	2015 XO_{22}	—	October 8, 2015	Haleakala	Pan-STARRS 1	·	1.1 km	MPC · JPL
786176	2015 XR_{23}	—	November 18, 2011	Mount Lemmon	Mount Lemmon Survey	KON	1.8 km	MPC · JPL
786177	2015 XF_{24}	—	December 2, 2015	Haleakala	Pan-STARRS 1	·	1.6 km	MPC · JPL
786178	2015 XJ_{24}	—	November 7, 2015	Haleakala	Pan-STARRS 1	·	930 m	MPC · JPL
786179	2015 XF_{26}	—	September 29, 2010	Mount Lemmon	Mount Lemmon Survey	·	1.2 km	MPC · JPL
786180	2015 XT_{31}	—	December 2, 2015	Haleakala	Pan-STARRS 1	(5)	820 m	MPC · JPL
786181	2015 XA_{33}	—	October 26, 2011	Haleakala	Pan-STARRS 1	·	900 m	MPC · JPL
786182	2015 XQ_{33}	—	May 23, 2014	Haleakala	Pan-STARRS 1	·	730 m	MPC · JPL
786183	2015 XE_{34}	—	February 1, 2012	Mount Lemmon	Mount Lemmon Survey	·	1.4 km	MPC · JPL
786184	2015 XJ_{37}	—	December 2, 2015	Haleakala	Pan-STARRS 1	·	1.1 km	MPC · JPL
786185	2015 XG_{38}	—	November 13, 2015	Kitt Peak	Spacewatch	·	1.4 km	MPC · JPL
786186	2015 XH_{38}	—	December 2, 2015	Haleakala	Pan-STARRS 1	·	1.4 km	MPC · JPL
786187	2015 XS_{40}	—	November 6, 2010	Mount Lemmon	Mount Lemmon Survey	·	1.3 km	MPC · JPL
786188	2015 XB_{43}	—	December 2, 2015	Haleakala	Pan-STARRS 1	·	1.1 km	MPC · JPL
786189	2015 XW_{45}	—	November 7, 2015	Mount Lemmon	Mount Lemmon Survey	·	1.1 km	MPC · JPL
786190	2015 XS_{46}	—	November 7, 2015	Haleakala	Pan-STARRS 1	·	1.1 km	MPC · JPL
786191	2015 XG_{47}	—	October 9, 2015	Haleakala	Pan-STARRS 1	·	760 m	MPC · JPL
786192	2015 XH_{47}	—	December 2, 2010	Mount Lemmon	Mount Lemmon Survey	·	1.9 km	MPC · JPL
786193	2015 XS_{48}	—	December 2, 2015	Haleakala	Pan-STARRS 1	·	1.0 km	MPC · JPL
786194	2015 XW_{48}	—	December 2, 2015	Haleakala	Pan-STARRS 1	EOS	1.5 km	MPC · JPL
786195	2015 XB_{53}	—	December 2, 2015	Haleakala	Pan-STARRS 1	·	1.8 km	MPC · JPL
786196	2015 XN_{58}	—	December 1, 2015	Haleakala	Pan-STARRS 1	EUN	870 m	MPC · JPL
786197	2015 XZ_{58}	—	November 13, 2015	Mount Lemmon	Mount Lemmon Survey	3:2	4.0 km	MPC · JPL
786198	2015 XU_{61}	—	March 26, 2003	Kitt Peak	Spacewatch	·	1.4 km	MPC · JPL
786199	2015 XV_{62}	—	December 1, 2015	Haleakala	Pan-STARRS 1	·	1.2 km	MPC · JPL
786200	2015 XT_{63}	—	September 17, 2010	Mount Lemmon	Mount Lemmon Survey	·	1.5 km	MPC · JPL

== 786201–786300 ==
back to top

Designation			Discovery			Properties		Ref
Permanent	Provisional	Named after	Date	Site	Discoverer(s)	Category	Diam.	Ref
786201	2015 XX_{64}	—	October 9, 2015	Haleakala	Pan-STARRS 1	·	950 m	MPC · JPL
786202	2015 XB_{67}	—	November 10, 2015	Mount Lemmon	Mount Lemmon Survey	·	920 m	MPC · JPL
786203	2015 XF_{68}	—	April 15, 2013	Haleakala	Pan-STARRS 1	·	870 m	MPC · JPL
786204	2015 XQ_{69}	—	September 18, 2006	Catalina	CSS	·	770 m	MPC · JPL
786205	2015 XJ_{72}	—	October 2, 2015	Haleakala	Pan-STARRS 1	JUN	740 m	MPC · JPL
786206	2015 XH_{77}	—	November 18, 2015	Haleakala	Pan-STARRS 1	·	840 m	MPC · JPL
786207	2015 XY_{78}	—	December 3, 2015	Haleakala	Pan-STARRS 1	·	2.2 km	MPC · JPL
786208	2015 XZ_{78}	—	December 3, 2015	Haleakala	Pan-STARRS 1	MAR	620 m	MPC · JPL
786209	2015 XX_{80}	—	December 3, 2015	Haleakala	Pan-STARRS 1	·	840 m	MPC · JPL
786210	2015 XV_{81}	—	December 3, 2015	Haleakala	Pan-STARRS 1	·	1.1 km	MPC · JPL
786211	2015 XC_{83}	—	December 3, 2015	Haleakala	Pan-STARRS 1	BRG	1.1 km	MPC · JPL
786212	2015 XO_{99}	—	December 4, 2015	Haleakala	Pan-STARRS 1	·	1.1 km	MPC · JPL
786213	2015 XT_{101}	—	December 4, 2015	Haleakala	Pan-STARRS 1	·	1.1 km	MPC · JPL
786214	2015 XK_{102}	—	December 4, 2015	Haleakala	Pan-STARRS 1	·	1.4 km	MPC · JPL
786215	2015 XC_{106}	—	November 11, 2001	Apache Point	SDSS	·	1.4 km	MPC · JPL
786216	2015 XV_{107}	—	October 8, 2015	Haleakala	Pan-STARRS 1	·	820 m	MPC · JPL
786217	2015 XN_{110}	—	December 4, 2015	Haleakala	Pan-STARRS 1	·	1.2 km	MPC · JPL
786218	2015 XZ_{110}	—	January 1, 2008	Kitt Peak	Spacewatch	ADE	1.2 km	MPC · JPL
786219	2015 XX_{114}	—	April 27, 2012	Haleakala	Pan-STARRS 1	HYG	1.9 km	MPC · JPL
786220	2015 XP_{117}	—	August 20, 2014	Haleakala	Pan-STARRS 1	EOS	1.3 km	MPC · JPL
786221	2015 XQ_{119}	—	August 15, 2014	Haleakala	Pan-STARRS 1	·	1.2 km	MPC · JPL
786222	2015 XQ_{120}	—	September 26, 2006	Kitt Peak	Spacewatch	·	970 m	MPC · JPL
786223	2015 XL_{121}	—	July 28, 2014	Haleakala	Pan-STARRS 1	·	2.0 km	MPC · JPL
786224	2015 XE_{122}	—	January 19, 2012	Haleakala	Pan-STARRS 1	·	1.1 km	MPC · JPL
786225	2015 XE_{124}	—	January 30, 2011	Haleakala	Pan-STARRS 1	·	2.3 km	MPC · JPL
786226	2015 XD_{125}	—	March 28, 2004	Kitt Peak	Spacewatch	·	1.0 km	MPC · JPL
786227	2015 XR_{125}	—	October 9, 2015	Haleakala	Pan-STARRS 1	·	990 m	MPC · JPL
786228	2015 XO_{127}	—	March 16, 2012	Mount Lemmon	Mount Lemmon Survey	·	1.1 km	MPC · JPL
786229	2015 XD_{130}	—	December 6, 2015	Catalina	CSS	APO	940 m	MPC · JPL
786230	2015 XT_{130}	—	December 3, 2015	Mount Lemmon	Mount Lemmon Survey	·	2.2 km	MPC · JPL
786231	2015 XX_{133}	—	February 10, 2008	Kitt Peak	Spacewatch	MIS	1.6 km	MPC · JPL
786232	2015 XJ_{135}	—	November 9, 2015	Mount Lemmon	Mount Lemmon Survey	·	1.0 km	MPC · JPL
786233	2015 XU_{137}	—	December 4, 2015	Mount Lemmon	Mount Lemmon Survey	·	800 m	MPC · JPL
786234	2015 XP_{140}	—	November 22, 2015	Mount Lemmon	Mount Lemmon Survey	·	980 m	MPC · JPL
786235	2015 XS_{140}	—	December 4, 2015	Mount Lemmon	Mount Lemmon Survey	·	2.2 km	MPC · JPL
786236	2015 XA_{141}	—	June 27, 2014	Haleakala	Pan-STARRS 1	MAR	810 m	MPC · JPL
786237	2015 XT_{143}	—	December 4, 2015	Mount Lemmon	Mount Lemmon Survey	(5)	970 m	MPC · JPL
786238	2015 XF_{144}	—	November 22, 2015	Mount Lemmon	Mount Lemmon Survey	KOR	1.1 km	MPC · JPL
786239	2015 XS_{146}	—	May 17, 2013	Mount Lemmon	Mount Lemmon Survey	·	940 m	MPC · JPL
786240	2015 XF_{149}	—	February 20, 2009	Mount Lemmon	Mount Lemmon Survey	·	1.3 km	MPC · JPL
786241	2015 XN_{149}	—	December 4, 2015	Haleakala	Pan-STARRS 1	·	960 m	MPC · JPL
786242	2015 XG_{155}	—	November 20, 2015	Mount Lemmon	Mount Lemmon Survey	·	1.0 km	MPC · JPL
786243	2015 XO_{155}	—	June 27, 2014	Haleakala	Pan-STARRS 1	·	1.8 km	MPC · JPL
786244	2015 XF_{156}	—	November 20, 2015	Mount Lemmon	Mount Lemmon Survey	EUN	770 m	MPC · JPL
786245	2015 XU_{157}	—	December 5, 2015	Haleakala	Pan-STARRS 1	·	820 m	MPC · JPL
786246	2015 XZ_{157}	—	December 5, 2015	Haleakala	Pan-STARRS 1	·	780 m	MPC · JPL
786247	2015 XK_{158}	—	December 5, 2015	Haleakala	Pan-STARRS 1	ADE	1.2 km	MPC · JPL
786248	2015 XB_{160}	—	October 11, 2015	Mount Lemmon	Mount Lemmon Survey	EUN	760 m	MPC · JPL
786249	2015 XK_{163}	—	October 25, 2015	Haleakala	Pan-STARRS 1	·	1.0 km	MPC · JPL
786250	2015 XP_{165}	—	October 24, 2015	Haleakala	Pan-STARRS 1	·	1.6 km	MPC · JPL
786251	2015 XV_{171}	—	May 21, 2014	Haleakala	Pan-STARRS 1	·	1.2 km	MPC · JPL
786252	2015 XJ_{174}	—	December 5, 2015	Haleakala	Pan-STARRS 1	·	2.1 km	MPC · JPL
786253	2015 XV_{175}	—	November 13, 2015	Mount Lemmon	Mount Lemmon Survey	·	1.2 km	MPC · JPL
786254	2015 XU_{176}	—	January 17, 2005	Kitt Peak	Spacewatch	·	2.1 km	MPC · JPL
786255	2015 XE_{177}	—	October 8, 2015	Haleakala	Pan-STARRS 1	EOS	1.3 km	MPC · JPL
786256	2015 XU_{177}	—	June 15, 2010	Mount Lemmon	Mount Lemmon Survey	·	970 m	MPC · JPL
786257	2015 XQ_{178}	—	February 28, 2008	Kitt Peak	Spacewatch	·	1.2 km	MPC · JPL
786258	2015 XJ_{179}	—	December 5, 2015	Haleakala	Pan-STARRS 1	(5)	750 m	MPC · JPL
786259	2015 XO_{180}	—	December 5, 2015	Haleakala	Pan-STARRS 1	HOF	1.7 km	MPC · JPL
786260	2015 XB_{181}	—	December 5, 2015	Haleakala	Pan-STARRS 1	·	1.1 km	MPC · JPL
786261	2015 XN_{182}	—	December 5, 2015	Haleakala	Pan-STARRS 1	·	1.4 km	MPC · JPL
786262	2015 XS_{182}	—	December 5, 2015	Haleakala	Pan-STARRS 1	·	1.2 km	MPC · JPL
786263	2015 XR_{183}	—	May 8, 2013	Haleakala	Pan-STARRS 1	ADE	1.3 km	MPC · JPL
786264	2015 XY_{186}	—	December 5, 2015	Haleakala	Pan-STARRS 1	·	920 m	MPC · JPL
786265	2015 XO_{189}	—	October 18, 2011	Haleakala	Pan-STARRS 1	·	960 m	MPC · JPL
786266	2015 XD_{191}	—	December 3, 2015	Mount Lemmon	Mount Lemmon Survey	·	840 m	MPC · JPL
786267	2015 XB_{196}	—	December 6, 2015	Mount Lemmon	Mount Lemmon Survey	·	1.6 km	MPC · JPL
786268	2015 XC_{196}	—	December 6, 2015	Mount Lemmon	Mount Lemmon Survey	·	860 m	MPC · JPL
786269	2015 XR_{200}	—	October 24, 2015	Mount Lemmon	Mount Lemmon Survey	·	1.1 km	MPC · JPL
786270	2015 XJ_{206}	—	November 22, 2015	Mount Lemmon	Mount Lemmon Survey	·	790 m	MPC · JPL
786271	2015 XX_{208}	—	November 22, 2015	Mount Lemmon	Mount Lemmon Survey	·	1.6 km	MPC · JPL
786272	2015 XJ_{211}	—	December 3, 2015	Mount Lemmon	Mount Lemmon Survey	·	1.2 km	MPC · JPL
786273	2015 XU_{214}	—	March 31, 2008	Mount Lemmon	Mount Lemmon Survey	·	1.4 km	MPC · JPL
786274	2015 XJ_{216}	—	November 7, 2010	Mount Lemmon	Mount Lemmon Survey	·	1.3 km	MPC · JPL
786275	2015 XR_{217}	—	April 8, 2008	Kitt Peak	Spacewatch	AGN	870 m	MPC · JPL
786276	2015 XM_{218}	—	November 22, 2015	Mount Lemmon	Mount Lemmon Survey	·	980 m	MPC · JPL
786277	2015 XL_{219}	—	January 3, 2012	Mount Lemmon	Mount Lemmon Survey	·	1.2 km	MPC · JPL
786278	2015 XA_{220}	—	July 25, 2014	Haleakala	Pan-STARRS 1	·	1.2 km	MPC · JPL
786279	2015 XD_{221}	—	August 25, 2014	Haleakala	Pan-STARRS 1	·	2.4 km	MPC · JPL
786280	2015 XF_{221}	—	December 6, 2015	Haleakala	Pan-STARRS 1	AGN	820 m	MPC · JPL
786281	2015 XQ_{222}	—	October 2, 2010	Mount Lemmon	Mount Lemmon Survey	·	1.5 km	MPC · JPL
786282	2015 XU_{222}	—	January 15, 2008	Kitt Peak	Spacewatch	·	870 m	MPC · JPL
786283	2015 XE_{230}	—	December 6, 2015	Haleakala	Pan-STARRS 1	·	1.3 km	MPC · JPL
786284	2015 XK_{230}	—	July 29, 2014	Haleakala	Pan-STARRS 1	·	880 m	MPC · JPL
786285	2015 XG_{231}	—	September 29, 2003	Kitt Peak	Spacewatch	·	2.0 km	MPC · JPL
786286	2015 XW_{232}	—	December 6, 2015	Haleakala	Pan-STARRS 1	·	700 m	MPC · JPL
786287	2015 XZ_{233}	—	October 27, 2005	Kitt Peak	Spacewatch	KOR	1.0 km	MPC · JPL
786288	2015 XW_{235}	—	December 6, 2015	Haleakala	Pan-STARRS 1	KOR	1.1 km	MPC · JPL
786289	2015 XD_{241}	—	December 6, 2015	Haleakala	Pan-STARRS 1	·	930 m	MPC · JPL
786290	2015 XJ_{245}	—	November 14, 2006	Mount Lemmon	Mount Lemmon Survey	·	1.2 km	MPC · JPL
786291	2015 XO_{248}	—	December 7, 2015	Haleakala	Pan-STARRS 1	EUN	710 m	MPC · JPL
786292	2015 XH_{249}	—	February 17, 2013	Kitt Peak	Spacewatch	·	1.1 km	MPC · JPL
786293	2015 XJ_{249}	—	October 21, 2015	Haleakala	Pan-STARRS 1	EUN	860 m	MPC · JPL
786294	2015 XT_{251}	—	October 21, 2015	Haleakala	Pan-STARRS 1	(194)	1.0 km	MPC · JPL
786295	2015 XD_{253}	—	December 7, 2015	Haleakala	Pan-STARRS 1	·	890 m	MPC · JPL
786296	2015 XS_{253}	—	December 7, 2015	Haleakala	Pan-STARRS 1	·	1.1 km	MPC · JPL
786297	2015 XQ_{254}	—	August 3, 2014	Haleakala	Pan-STARRS 1	BRA	1.1 km	MPC · JPL
786298	2015 XR_{254}	—	January 25, 2012	Haleakala	Pan-STARRS 1	·	910 m	MPC · JPL
786299	2015 XR_{259}	—	December 8, 2015	Mount Lemmon	Mount Lemmon Survey	·	1.1 km	MPC · JPL
786300	2015 XR_{263}	—	August 20, 2014	Haleakala	Pan-STARRS 1	·	1.4 km	MPC · JPL

== 786301–786400 ==
back to top

Designation			Discovery			Properties		Ref
Permanent	Provisional	Named after	Date	Site	Discoverer(s)	Category	Diam.	Ref
786301	2015 XB_{265}	—	December 6, 2015	Haleakala	Pan-STARRS 1	·	1.0 km	MPC · JPL
786302	2015 XH_{266}	—	December 6, 2015	Haleakala	Pan-STARRS 1	·	960 m	MPC · JPL
786303	2015 XL_{267}	—	December 6, 2015	Haleakala	Pan-STARRS 1	·	980 m	MPC · JPL
786304	2015 XO_{269}	—	July 25, 2014	Haleakala	Pan-STARRS 1	·	980 m	MPC · JPL
786305	2015 XG_{271}	—	August 20, 2014	Haleakala	Pan-STARRS 1	·	1.7 km	MPC · JPL
786306	2015 XT_{271}	—	December 6, 2015	Mount Lemmon	Mount Lemmon Survey	·	1.0 km	MPC · JPL
786307	2015 XB_{274}	—	January 26, 2007	Kitt Peak	Spacewatch	·	1.2 km	MPC · JPL
786308	2015 XA_{278}	—	December 6, 2015	Haleakala	Pan-STARRS 1	·	680 m	MPC · JPL
786309	2015 XH_{279}	—	November 22, 2015	Mount Lemmon	Mount Lemmon Survey	·	1.6 km	MPC · JPL
786310	2015 XX_{280}	—	December 4, 2015	Mount Lemmon	Mount Lemmon Survey	·	930 m	MPC · JPL
786311	2015 XG_{281}	—	March 13, 2012	Mount Lemmon	Mount Lemmon Survey	·	1.2 km	MPC · JPL
786312	2015 XF_{284}	—	January 14, 2011	Kitt Peak	Spacewatch	·	2.3 km	MPC · JPL
786313	2015 XN_{284}	—	December 7, 2015	Haleakala	Pan-STARRS 1	·	910 m	MPC · JPL
786314	2015 XD_{285}	—	November 19, 2015	Kitt Peak	Spacewatch	·	1.1 km	MPC · JPL
786315	2015 XJ_{293}	—	September 10, 2010	Kitt Peak	Spacewatch	·	1.0 km	MPC · JPL
786316	2015 XS_{299}	—	December 4, 2015	Mount Lemmon	Mount Lemmon Survey	·	980 m	MPC · JPL
786317	2015 XG_{300}	—	February 28, 2012	Haleakala	Pan-STARRS 1	·	1.7 km	MPC · JPL
786318	2015 XB_{302}	—	December 7, 2015	Haleakala	Pan-STARRS 1	·	1.4 km	MPC · JPL
786319	2015 XD_{303}	—	July 25, 2014	Haleakala	Pan-STARRS 1	·	1.1 km	MPC · JPL
786320	2015 XA_{305}	—	December 6, 2015	Mount Lemmon	Mount Lemmon Survey	·	850 m	MPC · JPL
786321	2015 XU_{306}	—	December 4, 2015	Mount Lemmon	Mount Lemmon Survey	·	850 m	MPC · JPL
786322	2015 XV_{306}	—	December 4, 2015	Mount Lemmon	Mount Lemmon Survey	·	1.5 km	MPC · JPL
786323	2015 XA_{307}	—	August 3, 2014	Haleakala	Pan-STARRS 1	·	1.3 km	MPC · JPL
786324	2015 XN_{313}	—	December 8, 2015	Mount Lemmon	Mount Lemmon Survey	·	910 m	MPC · JPL
786325	2015 XK_{314}	—	May 8, 2013	Haleakala	Pan-STARRS 1	·	1.1 km	MPC · JPL
786326	2015 XZ_{314}	—	February 13, 2008	Kitt Peak	Spacewatch	·	940 m	MPC · JPL
786327	2015 XT_{318}	—	November 1, 2005	Kitt Peak	Spacewatch	KOR	960 m	MPC · JPL
786328	2015 XE_{320}	—	December 8, 2015	Mount Lemmon	Mount Lemmon Survey	·	1.3 km	MPC · JPL
786329	2015 XH_{321}	—	October 2, 2010	Kitt Peak	Spacewatch	·	1.4 km	MPC · JPL
786330	2015 XL_{324}	—	December 8, 2015	Haleakala	Pan-STARRS 1	EUN	830 m	MPC · JPL
786331	2015 XY_{326}	—	November 6, 2015	ESA OGS	ESA OGS	·	950 m	MPC · JPL
786332	2015 XK_{327}	—	December 8, 2015	Mount Lemmon	Mount Lemmon Survey	HNS	810 m	MPC · JPL
786333	2015 XJ_{328}	—	August 19, 2006	Kitt Peak	Spacewatch	·	1.1 km	MPC · JPL
786334	2015 XV_{328}	—	December 8, 2015	Haleakala	Pan-STARRS 1	·	1.8 km	MPC · JPL
786335	2015 XD_{329}	—	September 27, 2003	Kitt Peak	Spacewatch	THM	1.6 km	MPC · JPL
786336	2015 XO_{333}	—	October 12, 2010	Mount Lemmon	Mount Lemmon Survey	·	1.3 km	MPC · JPL
786337	2015 XD_{337}	—	December 8, 2015	Haleakala	Pan-STARRS 1	·	1.6 km	MPC · JPL
786338	2015 XJ_{337}	—	October 29, 2005	Mount Lemmon	Mount Lemmon Survey	KOR	950 m	MPC · JPL
786339	2015 XS_{337}	—	December 8, 2015	Haleakala	Pan-STARRS 1	·	1.5 km	MPC · JPL
786340	2015 XH_{339}	—	June 18, 2013	Haleakala	Pan-STARRS 1	·	2.4 km	MPC · JPL
786341	2015 XQ_{342}	—	November 6, 2010	Mount Lemmon	Mount Lemmon Survey	·	1.3 km	MPC · JPL
786342	2015 XT_{342}	—	December 8, 2015	Haleakala	Pan-STARRS 1	·	830 m	MPC · JPL
786343	2015 XQ_{343}	—	May 15, 2013	Haleakala	Pan-STARRS 1	HNS	750 m	MPC · JPL
786344	2015 XM_{345}	—	December 6, 2015	Mount Lemmon	Mount Lemmon Survey	ADE	1.2 km	MPC · JPL
786345	2015 XW_{347}	—	December 8, 2015	Haleakala	Pan-STARRS 1	·	1.3 km	MPC · JPL
786346	2015 XF_{350}	—	September 19, 2015	Haleakala	Pan-STARRS 1	·	980 m	MPC · JPL
786347	2015 XZ_{350}	—	December 9, 2015	Haleakala	Pan-STARRS 1	·	1.5 km	MPC · JPL
786348	2015 XA_{351}	—	November 12, 2015	Mount Lemmon	Mount Lemmon Survey	·	1.0 km	MPC · JPL
786349	2015 XB_{356}	—	November 9, 2015	Mount Lemmon	Mount Lemmon Survey	·	1.1 km	MPC · JPL
786350	2015 XG_{358}	—	November 17, 2015	Haleakala	Pan-STARRS 1	·	1.5 km	MPC · JPL
786351	2015 XW_{360}	—	November 18, 2015	Haleakala	Pan-STARRS 1	·	1.0 km	MPC · JPL
786352	2015 XJ_{361}	—	September 9, 2015	Haleakala	Pan-STARRS 1	EUN	890 m	MPC · JPL
786353	2015 XG_{373}	—	December 8, 2015	Mount Lemmon	Mount Lemmon Survey	·	1.4 km	MPC · JPL
786354	2015 XC_{374}	—	November 25, 2005	Kitt Peak	Spacewatch	·	1.6 km	MPC · JPL
786355	2015 XA_{377}	—	December 6, 2015	Haleakala	Pan-STARRS 1	·	1.3 km	MPC · JPL
786356	2015 XK_{379}	—	March 6, 2000	Socorro	LINEAR	·	1.2 km	MPC · JPL
786357	2015 XZ_{381}	—	November 10, 2015	Mount Lemmon	Mount Lemmon Survey	·	1.1 km	MPC · JPL
786358	2015 XR_{382}	—	March 11, 2008	Mount Lemmon	Mount Lemmon Survey	·	1.2 km	MPC · JPL
786359	2015 XH_{383}	—	October 14, 2010	Mount Lemmon	Mount Lemmon Survey	·	1.1 km	MPC · JPL
786360	2015 XB_{390}	—	December 7, 2015	Haleakala	Pan-STARRS 1	EUN	940 m	MPC · JPL
786361	2015 XX_{391}	—	January 15, 1996	Kitt Peak	Spacewatch	·	1.5 km	MPC · JPL
786362	2015 XO_{392}	—	December 9, 2015	Haleakala	Pan-STARRS 1	·	1.2 km	MPC · JPL
786363	2015 XV_{392}	—	December 13, 2015	Haleakala	Pan-STARRS 1	(18466)	1.6 km	MPC · JPL
786364	2015 XW_{392}	—	December 13, 2015	Haleakala	Pan-STARRS 1	·	1.2 km	MPC · JPL
786365	2015 XY_{392}	—	April 22, 2012	Kitt Peak	Spacewatch	JUN	680 m	MPC · JPL
786366	2015 XB_{396}	—	November 15, 2006	Mount Lemmon	Mount Lemmon Survey	EUN	860 m	MPC · JPL
786367	2015 XF_{396}	—	December 9, 2015	Haleakala	Pan-STARRS 1	·	1.2 km	MPC · JPL
786368	2015 XQ_{397}	—	December 1, 2015	Haleakala	Pan-STARRS 1	·	920 m	MPC · JPL
786369	2015 XY_{397}	—	December 5, 2015	Haleakala	Pan-STARRS 1	·	1.3 km	MPC · JPL
786370	2015 XB_{398}	—	March 14, 2012	Haleakala	Pan-STARRS 1	JUN	780 m	MPC · JPL
786371	2015 XQ_{398}	—	February 1, 2012	Kitt Peak	Spacewatch	·	1.2 km	MPC · JPL
786372	2015 XR_{398}	—	May 8, 2008	Kitt Peak	Spacewatch	·	1.2 km	MPC · JPL
786373	2015 XE_{403}	—	July 25, 2014	Haleakala	Pan-STARRS 1	KOR	1.0 km	MPC · JPL
786374	2015 XR_{406}	—	December 4, 2015	Haleakala	Pan-STARRS 1	·	1.4 km	MPC · JPL
786375	2015 XB_{408}	—	December 6, 2015	Mount Lemmon	Mount Lemmon Survey	EUN	780 m	MPC · JPL
786376	2015 XF_{408}	—	December 6, 2015	Haleakala	Pan-STARRS 1	BRA	900 m	MPC · JPL
786377	2015 XC_{409}	—	December 7, 2015	Haleakala	Pan-STARRS 1	·	1.3 km	MPC · JPL
786378	2015 XH_{409}	—	December 7, 2015	Haleakala	Pan-STARRS 1	·	1.0 km	MPC · JPL
786379	2015 XT_{409}	—	March 29, 2011	Mount Lemmon	Mount Lemmon Survey	·	2.2 km	MPC · JPL
786380	2015 XT_{410}	—	January 3, 2012	Mount Lemmon	Mount Lemmon Survey	·	1.4 km	MPC · JPL
786381	2015 XX_{412}	—	June 21, 2012	Mount Lemmon	Mount Lemmon Survey	·	2.3 km	MPC · JPL
786382	2015 XN_{413}	—	August 20, 2014	Haleakala	Pan-STARRS 1	KOR	1.0 km	MPC · JPL
786383	2015 XO_{413}	—	December 6, 2015	Mount Lemmon	Mount Lemmon Survey	·	1.2 km	MPC · JPL
786384	2015 XD_{414}	—	December 9, 2015	Haleakala	Pan-STARRS 1	·	1.3 km	MPC · JPL
786385	2015 XW_{414}	—	January 15, 2007	Mauna Kea	P. A. Wiegert	·	930 m	MPC · JPL
786386	2015 XC_{415}	—	December 9, 2015	Haleakala	Pan-STARRS 1	·	2.2 km	MPC · JPL
786387	2015 XL_{416}	—	December 12, 2015	Haleakala	Pan-STARRS 1	·	1.0 km	MPC · JPL
786388	2015 XN_{417}	—	March 27, 2012	Mount Lemmon	Mount Lemmon Survey	EUN	910 m	MPC · JPL
786389	2015 XV_{418}	—	January 30, 2012	Haleakala	Pan-STARRS 1	·	1.4 km	MPC · JPL
786390	2015 XM_{419}	—	December 13, 2015	Haleakala	Pan-STARRS 1	·	1.3 km	MPC · JPL
786391	2015 XS_{419}	—	October 18, 2014	Mount Lemmon	Mount Lemmon Survey	·	1.5 km	MPC · JPL
786392	2015 XK_{421}	—	December 14, 2015	Haleakala	Pan-STARRS 1	·	1.3 km	MPC · JPL
786393	2015 XD_{424}	—	December 9, 2015	Haleakala	Pan-STARRS 1	·	1.6 km	MPC · JPL
786394	2015 XH_{424}	—	September 28, 2006	Catalina	CSS	·	1.6 km	MPC · JPL
786395	2015 XN_{424}	—	December 7, 2015	Haleakala	Pan-STARRS 1	·	1.5 km	MPC · JPL
786396	2015 XC_{425}	—	December 6, 2015	Mount Lemmon	Mount Lemmon Survey	·	1.2 km	MPC · JPL
786397	2015 XZ_{425}	—	December 6, 2015	Mount Lemmon	Mount Lemmon Survey	·	1.1 km	MPC · JPL
786398	2015 XO_{426}	—	December 7, 2015	Haleakala	Pan-STARRS 1	·	1.3 km	MPC · JPL
786399	2015 XR_{427}	—	November 21, 2015	Mount Lemmon	Mount Lemmon Survey	·	1.4 km	MPC · JPL
786400	2015 XB_{428}	—	December 14, 2015	Mount Lemmon	Mount Lemmon Survey	·	1.1 km	MPC · JPL

== 786401–786500 ==
back to top

Designation			Discovery			Properties		Ref
Permanent	Provisional	Named after	Date	Site	Discoverer(s)	Category	Diam.	Ref
786401	2015 XN_{428}	—	December 7, 2015	Haleakala	Pan-STARRS 1	·	1.0 km	MPC · JPL
786402	2015 XC_{430}	—	December 4, 2015	Mount Lemmon	Mount Lemmon Survey	·	930 m	MPC · JPL
786403	2015 XL_{430}	—	December 14, 2015	Mount Lemmon	Mount Lemmon Survey	·	1.5 km	MPC · JPL
786404	2015 XK_{431}	—	December 9, 2015	Haleakala	Pan-STARRS 1	·	1.0 km	MPC · JPL
786405	2015 XW_{436}	—	December 14, 2015	Haleakala	Pan-STARRS 1	·	990 m	MPC · JPL
786406	2015 XB_{438}	—	December 3, 2015	Haleakala	Pan-STARRS 1	·	1.2 km	MPC · JPL
786407	2015 XD_{439}	—	December 7, 2015	Haleakala	Pan-STARRS 1	·	960 m	MPC · JPL
786408	2015 XP_{439}	—	December 13, 2015	Haleakala	Pan-STARRS 1	·	2.1 km	MPC · JPL
786409	2015 XJ_{440}	—	December 5, 2015	Haleakala	Pan-STARRS 1	·	910 m	MPC · JPL
786410	2015 XL_{440}	—	December 8, 2015	Mount Lemmon	Mount Lemmon Survey	·	1.1 km	MPC · JPL
786411	2015 XR_{440}	—	December 5, 2015	Haleakala	Pan-STARRS 1	·	1.7 km	MPC · JPL
786412	2015 XX_{440}	—	December 13, 2015	Haleakala	Pan-STARRS 1	·	1.1 km	MPC · JPL
786413	2015 XQ_{441}	—	December 4, 2015	Mount Lemmon	Mount Lemmon Survey	·	950 m	MPC · JPL
786414	2015 XA_{442}	—	December 4, 2015	Mount Lemmon	Mount Lemmon Survey	·	930 m	MPC · JPL
786415	2015 XV_{443}	—	December 8, 2015	Haleakala	Pan-STARRS 1	·	850 m	MPC · JPL
786416	2015 XC_{445}	—	December 4, 2015	Haleakala	Pan-STARRS 1	EUN	890 m	MPC · JPL
786417	2015 XH_{445}	—	December 14, 2015	Mount Lemmon	Mount Lemmon Survey	·	1.5 km	MPC · JPL
786418	2015 XQ_{445}	—	December 9, 2015	Mount Lemmon	Mount Lemmon Survey	RAF	780 m	MPC · JPL
786419	2015 XR_{446}	—	December 9, 2015	Haleakala	Pan-STARRS 1	L5	7.1 km	MPC · JPL
786420	2015 XF_{447}	—	December 7, 2015	Haleakala	Pan-STARRS 1	·	1.1 km	MPC · JPL
786421	2015 XN_{447}	—	December 6, 2015	Mount Lemmon	Mount Lemmon Survey	·	930 m	MPC · JPL
786422	2015 XS_{447}	—	December 3, 2015	Haleakala	Pan-STARRS 1	·	1.3 km	MPC · JPL
786423	2015 XK_{448}	—	December 10, 2015	Mount Lemmon	Mount Lemmon Survey	·	1.2 km	MPC · JPL
786424	2015 XD_{449}	—	December 12, 2015	Haleakala	Pan-STARRS 1	·	2.2 km	MPC · JPL
786425	2015 XH_{449}	—	December 3, 2015	Haleakala	Pan-STARRS 1	·	2.4 km	MPC · JPL
786426	2015 XB_{450}	—	December 2, 2015	Haleakala	Pan-STARRS 1	·	820 m	MPC · JPL
786427	2015 XG_{451}	—	December 8, 2015	Haleakala	Pan-STARRS 1	·	1.1 km	MPC · JPL
786428	2015 XS_{454}	—	December 5, 2015	Haleakala	Pan-STARRS 1	·	1.2 km	MPC · JPL
786429	2015 XW_{454}	—	December 6, 2015	Mount Lemmon	Mount Lemmon Survey	·	1.2 km	MPC · JPL
786430	2015 XX_{458}	—	December 13, 2015	Haleakala	Pan-STARRS 1	·	1.3 km	MPC · JPL
786431	2015 XF_{463}	—	December 6, 2015	Mount Lemmon	Mount Lemmon Survey	·	1.5 km	MPC · JPL
786432	2015 XH_{463}	—	December 5, 2015	Haleakala	Pan-STARRS 1	·	1.6 km	MPC · JPL
786433	2015 XA_{464}	—	December 1, 2015	Haleakala	Pan-STARRS 1	·	1.4 km	MPC · JPL
786434	2015 XA_{466}	—	November 10, 2010	Mount Lemmon	Mount Lemmon Survey	·	1.5 km	MPC · JPL
786435	2015 XE_{467}	—	December 13, 2015	Haleakala	Pan-STARRS 1	·	1.3 km	MPC · JPL
786436	2015 XT_{467}	—	December 3, 2015	Haleakala	Pan-STARRS 1	EUN	780 m	MPC · JPL
786437	2015 XN_{469}	—	December 3, 2015	Haleakala	Pan-STARRS 1	·	1 km	MPC · JPL
786438	2015 XW_{469}	—	December 5, 2015	Haleakala	Pan-STARRS 1	·	1.1 km	MPC · JPL
786439	2015 XX_{469}	—	December 6, 2015	Haleakala	Pan-STARRS 1	EUN	840 m	MPC · JPL
786440	2015 XY_{469}	—	December 8, 2015	Haleakala	Pan-STARRS 1	·	760 m	MPC · JPL
786441	2015 XD_{470}	—	December 5, 2015	Haleakala	Pan-STARRS 1	·	920 m	MPC · JPL
786442	2015 XR_{470}	—	December 4, 2015	Mount Lemmon	Mount Lemmon Survey	·	810 m	MPC · JPL
786443	2015 XY_{470}	—	December 9, 2015	Haleakala	Pan-STARRS 1	·	1.0 km	MPC · JPL
786444	2015 XD_{471}	—	December 13, 2015	Haleakala	Pan-STARRS 1	·	990 m	MPC · JPL
786445	2015 XQ_{473}	—	December 7, 2015	Haleakala	Pan-STARRS 1	·	840 m	MPC · JPL
786446	2015 XD_{475}	—	December 8, 2015	Haleakala	Pan-STARRS 1	·	1.1 km	MPC · JPL
786447	2015 XY_{476}	—	December 13, 2015	Haleakala	Pan-STARRS 1	EOS	1.3 km	MPC · JPL
786448	2015 XC_{477}	—	December 9, 2015	Haleakala	Pan-STARRS 1	·	1.8 km	MPC · JPL
786449	2015 XE_{477}	—	December 9, 2015	Haleakala	Pan-STARRS 1	·	1.4 km	MPC · JPL
786450	2015 XQ_{477}	—	December 13, 2015	Haleakala	Pan-STARRS 1	·	1.1 km	MPC · JPL
786451	2015 XV_{478}	—	December 13, 2015	Haleakala	Pan-STARRS 1	·	1.6 km	MPC · JPL
786452	2015 XR_{479}	—	December 8, 2015	Haleakala	Pan-STARRS 1	KOR	910 m	MPC · JPL
786453	2015 XE_{480}	—	December 8, 2015	Haleakala	Pan-STARRS 1	·	820 m	MPC · JPL
786454	2015 XH_{481}	—	December 9, 2015	Haleakala	Pan-STARRS 1	KRM	1.5 km	MPC · JPL
786455	2015 XV_{481}	—	December 4, 2015	Haleakala	Pan-STARRS 1	·	910 m	MPC · JPL
786456	2015 XX_{481}	—	December 1, 2015	Haleakala	Pan-STARRS 1	·	2.0 km	MPC · JPL
786457	2015 XH_{482}	—	December 14, 2015	Haleakala	Pan-STARRS 1	·	1.1 km	MPC · JPL
786458	2015 XL_{483}	—	December 4, 2015	Haleakala	Pan-STARRS 1	·	1.1 km	MPC · JPL
786459	2015 XK_{486}	—	December 4, 2015	Haleakala	Pan-STARRS 1	·	2.1 km	MPC · JPL
786460	2015 XM_{486}	—	December 10, 2001	Kitt Peak	Spacewatch	·	2.1 km	MPC · JPL
786461	2015 XH_{488}	—	December 14, 2015	Mount Lemmon	Mount Lemmon Survey	·	2.5 km	MPC · JPL
786462	2015 XA_{489}	—	December 4, 2015	Haleakala	Pan-STARRS 1	·	1.6 km	MPC · JPL
786463	2015 XD_{490}	—	December 1, 2015	Haleakala	Pan-STARRS 1	·	1.5 km	MPC · JPL
786464	2015 XZ_{495}	—	December 5, 2015	Haleakala	Pan-STARRS 1	NEM	1.4 km	MPC · JPL
786465	2015 XE_{496}	—	December 8, 2015	Mount Lemmon	Mount Lemmon Survey	RAF	630 m	MPC · JPL
786466	2015 XP_{496}	—	December 13, 2015	Haleakala	Pan-STARRS 1	(194)	1.2 km	MPC · JPL
786467	2015 XG_{497}	—	December 6, 2015	Mount Lemmon	Mount Lemmon Survey	·	1.4 km	MPC · JPL
786468	2015 XH_{498}	—	December 4, 2015	Haleakala	Pan-STARRS 1	·	1.4 km	MPC · JPL
786469	2015 XJ_{502}	—	December 4, 2015	Haleakala	Pan-STARRS 1	·	1.1 km	MPC · JPL
786470	2015 XT_{503}	—	August 30, 1998	Kitt Peak	Spacewatch	EUN	1.0 km	MPC · JPL
786471	2015 XU_{503}	—	December 4, 2015	Mount Lemmon	Mount Lemmon Survey	·	970 m	MPC · JPL
786472	2015 XC_{505}	—	April 28, 2009	Mount Lemmon	Mount Lemmon Survey	·	1.0 km	MPC · JPL
786473	2015 XQ_{505}	—	December 14, 2015	Haleakala	Pan-STARRS 1	·	1.4 km	MPC · JPL
786474	2015 XU_{512}	—	December 9, 2015	Haleakala	Pan-STARRS 1	·	1.1 km	MPC · JPL
786475	2015 XX_{512}	—	December 8, 2015	Haleakala	Pan-STARRS 1	·	1.3 km	MPC · JPL
786476	2015 YF_{3}	—	December 6, 2015	Mount Lemmon	Mount Lemmon Survey	·	780 m	MPC · JPL
786477	2015 YP_{4}	—	July 25, 2014	Haleakala	Pan-STARRS 1	·	1.4 km	MPC · JPL
786478	2015 YB_{7}	—	November 16, 2006	Mount Lemmon	Mount Lemmon Survey	·	1.6 km	MPC · JPL
786479	2015 YU_{7}	—	December 24, 2015	Haleakala	Pan-STARRS 1	ATE · PHA	190 m	MPC · JPL
786480	2015 YB_{10}	—	October 19, 2007	Catalina	CSS	·	2.0 km	MPC · JPL
786481	2015 YA_{13}	—	December 31, 2015	Haleakala	Pan-STARRS 1	HNS	900 m	MPC · JPL
786482	2015 YA_{14}	—	February 14, 2012	Haleakala	Pan-STARRS 1	EUN	920 m	MPC · JPL
786483	2015 YK_{19}	—	November 17, 2006	Kitt Peak	Spacewatch	·	1.7 km	MPC · JPL
786484	2015 YE_{21}	—	December 17, 2015	Haleakala	Pan-STARRS 1	AMO	230 m	MPC · JPL
786485	2015 YA_{24}	—	November 13, 2015	Mount Lemmon	Mount Lemmon Survey	·	1.1 km	MPC · JPL
786486	2015 YP_{24}	—	December 31, 2015	Haleakala	Pan-STARRS 1	·	2.1 km	MPC · JPL
786487	2015 YO_{25}	—	December 18, 2015	Mount Lemmon	Mount Lemmon Survey	·	1.1 km	MPC · JPL
786488	2015 YN_{26}	—	August 20, 2014	Haleakala	Pan-STARRS 1	·	960 m	MPC · JPL
786489	2015 YT_{26}	—	December 19, 2015	Mount Lemmon	Mount Lemmon Survey	KOR	1.0 km	MPC · JPL
786490	2015 YF_{27}	—	January 30, 2012	Kitt Peak	Spacewatch	MAR	930 m	MPC · JPL
786491	2015 YJ_{28}	—	December 16, 2015	Mount Lemmon	Mount Lemmon Survey	·	3.1 km	MPC · JPL
786492	2015 YL_{28}	—	December 19, 2015	Mount Lemmon	Mount Lemmon Survey	·	2.5 km	MPC · JPL
786493	2015 YX_{31}	—	December 18, 2015	Mount Lemmon	Mount Lemmon Survey	·	1.4 km	MPC · JPL
786494	2015 YA_{32}	—	December 18, 2015	Mount Lemmon	Mount Lemmon Survey	·	1.1 km	MPC · JPL
786495	2015 YV_{32}	—	December 18, 2015	Mount Lemmon	Mount Lemmon Survey	·	2.0 km	MPC · JPL
786496	2015 YK_{33}	—	December 19, 2015	Mount Lemmon	Mount Lemmon Survey	VER	2.0 km	MPC · JPL
786497	2015 YZ_{33}	—	September 19, 2014	Haleakala	Pan-STARRS 1	·	1.8 km	MPC · JPL
786498	2015 YW_{34}	—	January 29, 2012	Haleakala	Pan-STARRS 1	·	1.5 km	MPC · JPL
786499	2015 YT_{35}	—	December 18, 2015	Mount Lemmon	Mount Lemmon Survey	·	1.3 km	MPC · JPL
786500	2015 YR_{36}	—	December 19, 2015	Mount Lemmon	Mount Lemmon Survey	·	1.3 km	MPC · JPL

== 786501–786600 ==
back to top

Designation			Discovery			Properties		Ref
Permanent	Provisional	Named after	Date	Site	Discoverer(s)	Category	Diam.	Ref
786501	2015 YH_{38}	—	December 17, 2015	Mount Lemmon	Mount Lemmon Survey	·	920 m	MPC · JPL
786502	2015 YS_{38}	—	December 18, 2015	Mount Lemmon	Mount Lemmon Survey	·	1.1 km	MPC · JPL
786503	2015 YJ_{39}	—	December 19, 2015	Mount Lemmon	Mount Lemmon Survey	·	1.2 km	MPC · JPL
786504	2016 AT	—	February 3, 2012	Haleakala	Pan-STARRS 1	EUN	810 m	MPC · JPL
786505	2016 AL_{3}	—	January 2, 2016	Kitt Peak	Spacewatch	·	1.0 km	MPC · JPL
786506	2016 AL_{7}	—	August 27, 2014	Haleakala	Pan-STARRS 1	HOF	2.1 km	MPC · JPL
786507	2016 AZ_{9}	—	February 17, 2007	Catalina	CSS	·	1.5 km	MPC · JPL
786508	2016 AS_{10}	—	January 2, 2016	Kitt Peak	Spacewatch	·	1.3 km	MPC · JPL
786509	2016 AN_{14}	—	February 7, 2011	Mount Lemmon	Mount Lemmon Survey	THM	1.9 km	MPC · JPL
786510	2016 AK_{15}	—	January 12, 2011	Mount Lemmon	Mount Lemmon Survey	·	1.6 km	MPC · JPL
786511	2016 AX_{15}	—	August 23, 2014	Haleakala	Pan-STARRS 1	·	1 km	MPC · JPL
786512	2016 AN_{16}	—	January 3, 2016	Mount Lemmon	Mount Lemmon Survey	·	1.3 km	MPC · JPL
786513	2016 AE_{18}	—	September 22, 2009	Mount Lemmon	Mount Lemmon Survey	KOR	960 m	MPC · JPL
786514	2016 AC_{19}	—	September 5, 2010	Mount Lemmon	Mount Lemmon Survey	·	1.3 km	MPC · JPL
786515	2016 AB_{21}	—	December 27, 2011	Mount Lemmon	Mount Lemmon Survey	·	1.1 km	MPC · JPL
786516	2016 AJ_{23}	—	December 18, 2015	Mount Lemmon	Mount Lemmon Survey	·	1.7 km	MPC · JPL
786517	2016 AK_{23}	—	January 3, 2016	Haleakala	Pan-STARRS 1	·	1.1 km	MPC · JPL
786518	2016 AC_{25}	—	January 3, 2016	Haleakala	Pan-STARRS 1	·	1.3 km	MPC · JPL
786519	2016 AY_{25}	—	January 3, 2016	Haleakala	Pan-STARRS 1	·	1.1 km	MPC · JPL
786520	2016 AA_{29}	—	March 14, 2012	Haleakala	Pan-STARRS 1	ADE	1.2 km	MPC · JPL
786521	2016 AH_{31}	—	January 3, 2016	Mount Lemmon	Mount Lemmon Survey	·	1.3 km	MPC · JPL
786522	2016 AR_{35}	—	January 3, 2016	Mount Lemmon	Mount Lemmon Survey	EOS	1.2 km	MPC · JPL
786523	2016 AD_{38}	—	July 27, 2014	Haleakala	Pan-STARRS 1	·	960 m	MPC · JPL
786524	2016 AW_{38}	—	January 4, 2016	Haleakala	Pan-STARRS 1	·	870 m	MPC · JPL
786525	2016 AN_{39}	—	February 10, 2008	Mount Lemmon	Mount Lemmon Survey	·	1.1 km	MPC · JPL
786526	2016 AR_{40}	—	January 3, 2016	Mount Lemmon	Mount Lemmon Survey	·	850 m	MPC · JPL
786527	2016 AO_{41}	—	January 3, 2016	Mount Lemmon	Mount Lemmon Survey	·	1.3 km	MPC · JPL
786528	2016 AS_{41}	—	January 3, 2016	Mount Lemmon	Mount Lemmon Survey	·	1.0 km	MPC · JPL
786529	2016 AD_{42}	—	January 3, 2016	Mount Lemmon	Mount Lemmon Survey	·	1.2 km	MPC · JPL
786530	2016 AW_{42}	—	January 3, 2016	Mount Lemmon	Mount Lemmon Survey	·	1.1 km	MPC · JPL
786531	2016 AY_{42}	—	August 20, 2014	Haleakala	Pan-STARRS 1	·	1.1 km	MPC · JPL
786532	2016 AM_{43}	—	January 3, 2016	Mount Lemmon	Mount Lemmon Survey	·	1.6 km	MPC · JPL
786533	2016 AM_{46}	—	January 6, 2008	Mauna Kea	P. A. Wiegert, A. M. Gilbert	·	750 m	MPC · JPL
786534	2016 AK_{47}	—	January 4, 2016	Haleakala	Pan-STARRS 1	·	1.9 km	MPC · JPL
786535	2016 AZ_{48}	—	January 4, 2016	Haleakala	Pan-STARRS 1	·	1.0 km	MPC · JPL
786536	2016 AA_{50}	—	January 4, 2016	Haleakala	Pan-STARRS 1	KOR	980 m	MPC · JPL
786537	2016 AT_{50}	—	March 7, 2008	Kitt Peak	Spacewatch	·	1.0 km	MPC · JPL
786538	2016 AY_{51}	—	November 22, 2006	Kitt Peak	Spacewatch	·	1.2 km	MPC · JPL
786539	2016 AA_{52}	—	January 4, 2016	Haleakala	Pan-STARRS 1	·	1.0 km	MPC · JPL
786540	2016 AX_{52}	—	December 18, 2015	Mount Lemmon	Mount Lemmon Survey	GEF	730 m	MPC · JPL
786541	2016 AY_{52}	—	September 20, 2014	Haleakala	Pan-STARRS 1	KOR	1.0 km	MPC · JPL
786542	2016 AA_{54}	—	January 4, 2016	Haleakala	Pan-STARRS 1	·	1.2 km	MPC · JPL
786543	2016 AX_{54}	—	May 9, 2007	Mount Lemmon	Mount Lemmon Survey	·	1.4 km	MPC · JPL
786544	2016 AZ_{55}	—	January 4, 2016	Haleakala	Pan-STARRS 1	·	1.2 km	MPC · JPL
786545	2016 AX_{56}	—	January 20, 2012	Mount Lemmon	Mount Lemmon Survey	·	740 m	MPC · JPL
786546	2016 AG_{58}	—	January 4, 2016	Haleakala	Pan-STARRS 1	·	1.4 km	MPC · JPL
786547	2016 AO_{60}	—	March 25, 2012	Mount Lemmon	Mount Lemmon Survey	·	1.3 km	MPC · JPL
786548	2016 AJ_{62}	—	January 4, 2016	Haleakala	Pan-STARRS 1	KOR	1.0 km	MPC · JPL
786549	2016 AS_{62}	—	February 16, 2012	Haleakala	Pan-STARRS 1	·	1.2 km	MPC · JPL
786550	2016 AX_{73}	—	October 18, 2014	Mount Lemmon	Mount Lemmon Survey	·	1.9 km	MPC · JPL
786551	2016 AY_{74}	—	August 24, 2001	La Palma	D. Davis, Howell, S.	HNS	880 m	MPC · JPL
786552	2016 AU_{75}	—	October 29, 2010	Mount Lemmon	Mount Lemmon Survey	·	1.2 km	MPC · JPL
786553	2016 AP_{79}	—	July 15, 2013	Haleakala	Pan-STARRS 1	·	2.3 km	MPC · JPL
786554	2016 AH_{81}	—	January 5, 2016	Haleakala	Pan-STARRS 1	·	1.0 km	MPC · JPL
786555	2016 AH_{84}	—	December 6, 2015	Haleakala	Pan-STARRS 1	·	940 m	MPC · JPL
786556	2016 AK_{86}	—	July 26, 2015	Haleakala	Pan-STARRS 1	·	1.5 km	MPC · JPL
786557	2016 AL_{88}	—	December 8, 2015	Haleakala	Pan-STARRS 1	·	2.3 km	MPC · JPL
786558	2016 AG_{90}	—	July 26, 2014	Haleakala	Pan-STARRS 1	·	1.4 km	MPC · JPL
786559	2016 AZ_{92}	—	January 7, 2016	Haleakala	Pan-STARRS 1	·	1.3 km	MPC · JPL
786560	2016 AE_{95}	—	January 4, 2016	Haleakala	Pan-STARRS 1	·	1.2 km	MPC · JPL
786561	2016 AG_{96}	—	January 14, 2011	Mount Lemmon	Mount Lemmon Survey	·	1.3 km	MPC · JPL
786562	2016 AN_{99}	—	December 16, 2015	Mount Lemmon	Mount Lemmon Survey	·	1.3 km	MPC · JPL
786563	2016 AR_{100}	—	January 7, 2016	Haleakala	Pan-STARRS 1	·	1.3 km	MPC · JPL
786564	2016 AJ_{102}	—	January 7, 2016	Haleakala	Pan-STARRS 1	·	1.0 km	MPC · JPL
786565	2016 AP_{103}	—	November 17, 2009	Kitt Peak	Spacewatch	·	1.7 km	MPC · JPL
786566	2016 AG_{111}	—	July 5, 2014	Haleakala	Pan-STARRS 1	HNS	1.0 km	MPC · JPL
786567	2016 AU_{112}	—	January 7, 2016	Haleakala	Pan-STARRS 1	KOR	900 m	MPC · JPL
786568	2016 AU_{114}	—	January 25, 2007	Kitt Peak	Spacewatch	EUN	980 m	MPC · JPL
786569	2016 AK_{115}	—	July 13, 2013	Haleakala	Pan-STARRS 1	·	1.3 km	MPC · JPL
786570	2016 AQ_{115}	—	January 8, 2016	Haleakala	Pan-STARRS 1	·	1.3 km	MPC · JPL
786571	2016 AF_{116}	—	April 16, 2012	Haleakala	Pan-STARRS 1	·	1.5 km	MPC · JPL
786572	2016 AK_{116}	—	January 8, 2016	Haleakala	Pan-STARRS 1	·	1.1 km	MPC · JPL
786573	2016 AO_{116}	—	January 2, 2011	Mount Lemmon	Mount Lemmon Survey	AGN	760 m	MPC · JPL
786574	2016 AF_{118}	—	December 21, 2006	Kitt Peak	L. H. Wasserman, M. W. Buie	·	1.3 km	MPC · JPL
786575	2016 AV_{121}	—	April 14, 2012	Haleakala	Pan-STARRS 1	·	2.0 km	MPC · JPL
786576	2016 AH_{125}	—	July 27, 2009	Kitt Peak	Spacewatch	·	1.6 km	MPC · JPL
786577	2016 AZ_{126}	—	January 8, 2016	Haleakala	Pan-STARRS 1	·	1.9 km	MPC · JPL
786578	2016 AH_{127}	—	January 8, 2016	Haleakala	Pan-STARRS 1	·	1.5 km	MPC · JPL
786579	2016 AK_{127}	—	May 22, 2003	Kitt Peak	Spacewatch	·	1.4 km	MPC · JPL
786580	2016 AV_{127}	—	March 27, 2003	Kitt Peak	Spacewatch	·	1.7 km	MPC · JPL
786581	2016 AK_{130}	—	November 27, 2014	Mount Lemmon	Mount Lemmon Survey	·	2.6 km	MPC · JPL
786582	2016 AP_{132}	—	January 9, 2016	Haleakala	Pan-STARRS 1	·	980 m	MPC · JPL
786583	2016 AQ_{133}	—	October 14, 2015	Haleakala	Pan-STARRS 1	·	980 m	MPC · JPL
786584	2016 AV_{142}	—	January 9, 2016	Haleakala	Pan-STARRS 1	EUN	940 m	MPC · JPL
786585	2016 AA_{144}	—	December 13, 2015	Haleakala	Pan-STARRS 1	·	940 m	MPC · JPL
786586	2016 AD_{145}	—	January 9, 2016	Haleakala	Pan-STARRS 1	·	1.2 km	MPC · JPL
786587	2016 AL_{147}	—	December 9, 2015	Haleakala	Pan-STARRS 1	·	1.7 km	MPC · JPL
786588	2016 AM_{147}	—	December 13, 2015	Haleakala	Pan-STARRS 1	EUN	940 m	MPC · JPL
786589	2016 AP_{148}	—	November 27, 2006	Mount Lemmon	Mount Lemmon Survey	·	1.8 km	MPC · JPL
786590	2016 AX_{148}	—	January 10, 2016	Haleakala	Pan-STARRS 1	·	1.5 km	MPC · JPL
786591	2016 AF_{149}	—	January 4, 2016	Haleakala	Pan-STARRS 1	·	1.3 km	MPC · JPL
786592	2016 AK_{149}	—	February 24, 2012	Mount Lemmon	Mount Lemmon Survey	·	1.3 km	MPC · JPL
786593	2016 AD_{152}	—	January 11, 2016	Haleakala	Pan-STARRS 1	·	1.2 km	MPC · JPL
786594	2016 AU_{154}	—	January 11, 2016	Haleakala	Pan-STARRS 1	·	1.1 km	MPC · JPL
786595	2016 AX_{154}	—	January 11, 2016	Haleakala	Pan-STARRS 1	·	1.0 km	MPC · JPL
786596	2016 AQ_{157}	—	January 4, 2016	Haleakala	Pan-STARRS 1	·	1.5 km	MPC · JPL
786597	2016 AG_{158}	—	October 14, 2014	Kitt Peak	Spacewatch	·	2.1 km	MPC · JPL
786598	2016 AU_{158}	—	January 11, 2016	Haleakala	Pan-STARRS 1	·	1.4 km	MPC · JPL
786599	2016 AT_{159}	—	March 29, 2012	Mount Lemmon	Mount Lemmon Survey	·	1.1 km	MPC · JPL
786600	2016 AR_{160}	—	January 11, 2016	Haleakala	Pan-STARRS 1	EUN	980 m	MPC · JPL

== 786601–786700 ==
back to top

Designation			Discovery			Properties		Ref
Permanent	Provisional	Named after	Date	Site	Discoverer(s)	Category	Diam.	Ref
786601	2016 AV_{169}	—	January 9, 2016	Haleakala	Pan-STARRS 1	·	1.1 km	MPC · JPL
786602	2016 AG_{173}	—	April 15, 2012	Haleakala	Pan-STARRS 1	·	1.4 km	MPC · JPL
786603	2016 AM_{173}	—	January 10, 2016	Haleakala	Pan-STARRS 1	·	1.3 km	MPC · JPL
786604	2016 AH_{174}	—	March 13, 2012	Mount Lemmon	Mount Lemmon Survey	EUN	760 m	MPC · JPL
786605	2016 AO_{176}	—	January 11, 2016	Haleakala	Pan-STARRS 1	·	1.2 km	MPC · JPL
786606	2016 AN_{177}	—	December 13, 2015	Haleakala	Pan-STARRS 1	·	1.9 km	MPC · JPL
786607	2016 AU_{177}	—	September 23, 2008	Kitt Peak	Spacewatch	·	2.1 km	MPC · JPL
786608	2016 AY_{178}	—	January 11, 2016	Haleakala	Pan-STARRS 1	·	1.4 km	MPC · JPL
786609	2016 AJ_{182}	—	November 20, 2014	Haleakala	Pan-STARRS 1	·	1.4 km	MPC · JPL
786610	2016 AL_{184}	—	December 31, 2007	Mount Lemmon	Mount Lemmon Survey	EUN	940 m	MPC · JPL
786611	2016 AR_{189}	—	January 13, 2016	Haleakala	Pan-STARRS 1	·	1.6 km	MPC · JPL
786612	2016 AS_{189}	—	September 18, 2014	Haleakala	Pan-STARRS 1	·	1.9 km	MPC · JPL
786613	2016 AA_{190}	—	January 13, 2016	Mount Lemmon	Mount Lemmon Survey	·	1.3 km	MPC · JPL
786614	2016 AN_{200}	—	December 7, 2015	Haleakala	Pan-STARRS 1	HNS	930 m	MPC · JPL
786615	2016 AR_{200}	—	January 1, 2016	Haleakala	Pan-STARRS 1	·	1.3 km	MPC · JPL
786616	2016 AW_{200}	—	December 16, 2006	Mount Lemmon	Mount Lemmon Survey	·	1.4 km	MPC · JPL
786617	2016 AV_{202}	—	February 8, 2007	Mount Lemmon	Mount Lemmon Survey	·	1.1 km	MPC · JPL
786618	2016 AX_{202}	—	January 3, 2016	Haleakala	Pan-STARRS 1	·	1.0 km	MPC · JPL
786619	2016 AH_{204}	—	January 4, 2016	Haleakala	Pan-STARRS 1	·	2.2 km	MPC · JPL
786620	2016 AR_{204}	—	January 4, 2016	Haleakala	Pan-STARRS 1	·	1.2 km	MPC · JPL
786621	2016 AJ_{205}	—	August 10, 2004	Campo Imperatore	CINEOS	·	1.4 km	MPC · JPL
786622	2016 AR_{206}	—	January 7, 2016	Haleakala	Pan-STARRS 1	·	1.2 km	MPC · JPL
786623	2016 AV_{206}	—	January 7, 2016	Haleakala	Pan-STARRS 1	·	990 m	MPC · JPL
786624	2016 AC_{207}	—	January 7, 2016	Haleakala	Pan-STARRS 1	·	1.2 km	MPC · JPL
786625	2016 AS_{207}	—	January 7, 2016	Haleakala	Pan-STARRS 1	·	1.6 km	MPC · JPL
786626	2016 AL_{208}	—	February 8, 2007	Kitt Peak	Spacewatch	·	1.3 km	MPC · JPL
786627	2016 AU_{208}	—	January 8, 2016	Haleakala	Pan-STARRS 1	·	1.6 km	MPC · JPL
786628	2016 AA_{209}	—	September 27, 2013	Haleakala	Pan-STARRS 1	·	2.6 km	MPC · JPL
786629	2016 AB_{211}	—	January 9, 2016	Haleakala	Pan-STARRS 1	·	2.3 km	MPC · JPL
786630	2016 AM_{212}	—	January 12, 2016	Haleakala	Pan-STARRS 1	·	1.6 km	MPC · JPL
786631	2016 AV_{214}	—	February 23, 2007	Mount Lemmon	Mount Lemmon Survey	AEO	750 m	MPC · JPL
786632	2016 AF_{215}	—	January 15, 2016	Haleakala	Pan-STARRS 1	·	1.3 km	MPC · JPL
786633	2016 AR_{218}	—	October 7, 2005	Mount Lemmon	Mount Lemmon Survey	·	1.1 km	MPC · JPL
786634	2016 AW_{218}	—	March 24, 2012	Mount Lemmon	Mount Lemmon Survey	·	1.2 km	MPC · JPL
786635	2016 AK_{219}	—	October 25, 2014	Mount Lemmon	Mount Lemmon Survey	·	1.3 km	MPC · JPL
786636	2016 AX_{221}	—	March 10, 2007	Mount Lemmon	Mount Lemmon Survey	·	1.4 km	MPC · JPL
786637	2016 AZ_{221}	—	January 9, 2016	Haleakala	Pan-STARRS 1	BRG	1.1 km	MPC · JPL
786638	2016 AO_{222}	—	January 16, 2007	Mount Lemmon	Mount Lemmon Survey	·	1.2 km	MPC · JPL
786639	2016 AT_{222}	—	January 14, 2016	Haleakala	Pan-STARRS 1	·	1.3 km	MPC · JPL
786640	2016 AC_{224}	—	January 8, 2016	Haleakala	Pan-STARRS 1	·	1.5 km	MPC · JPL
786641	2016 AC_{225}	—	January 3, 2016	Haleakala	Pan-STARRS 1	·	1.2 km	MPC · JPL
786642	2016 AD_{225}	—	January 16, 2008	Kitt Peak	Spacewatch	·	930 m	MPC · JPL
786643	2016 AY_{225}	—	January 4, 2016	Haleakala	Pan-STARRS 1	·	1.1 km	MPC · JPL
786644	2016 AH_{226}	—	September 2, 2014	Haleakala	Pan-STARRS 1	·	1.3 km	MPC · JPL
786645	2016 AE_{227}	—	March 15, 2012	Kitt Peak	Spacewatch	GEF	850 m	MPC · JPL
786646	2016 AM_{227}	—	July 12, 2013	Haleakala	Pan-STARRS 1	·	1.1 km	MPC · JPL
786647	2016 AV_{227}	—	January 3, 2016	Haleakala	Pan-STARRS 1	·	2.3 km	MPC · JPL
786648	2016 AF_{230}	—	January 14, 2016	Haleakala	Pan-STARRS 1	·	2.1 km	MPC · JPL
786649	2016 AP_{230}	—	August 28, 2013	Mount Lemmon	Mount Lemmon Survey	·	2.3 km	MPC · JPL
786650	2016 AW_{230}	—	January 3, 2016	Haleakala	Pan-STARRS 1	·	1.3 km	MPC · JPL
786651	2016 AJ_{233}	—	December 18, 2015	Mount Lemmon	Mount Lemmon Survey	·	1.5 km	MPC · JPL
786652	2016 AN_{234}	—	January 7, 2016	Haleakala	Pan-STARRS 1	EOS	1.4 km	MPC · JPL
786653	2016 AS_{234}	—	January 8, 2016	Haleakala	Pan-STARRS 1	·	1.6 km	MPC · JPL
786654	2016 AX_{234}	—	October 22, 2009	Mount Lemmon	Mount Lemmon Survey	·	1.2 km	MPC · JPL
786655	2016 AX_{235}	—	February 28, 2012	Haleakala	Pan-STARRS 1	AGN	830 m	MPC · JPL
786656	2016 AZ_{237}	—	January 13, 2016	Haleakala	Pan-STARRS 1	·	1.3 km	MPC · JPL
786657	2016 AR_{238}	—	September 2, 2014	Haleakala	Pan-STARRS 1	HNS	880 m	MPC · JPL
786658	2016 AN_{239}	—	January 2, 2016	Mount Lemmon	Mount Lemmon Survey	·	930 m	MPC · JPL
786659	2016 AZ_{239}	—	November 14, 2010	Mount Lemmon	Mount Lemmon Survey	·	1.1 km	MPC · JPL
786660	2016 AL_{240}	—	January 2, 2016	Haleakala	Pan-STARRS 1	·	1.2 km	MPC · JPL
786661	2016 AP_{240}	—	March 3, 2012	Kitt Peak	Spacewatch	·	1.3 km	MPC · JPL
786662	2016 AB_{241}	—	December 16, 2015	Mount Lemmon	Mount Lemmon Survey	·	1.6 km	MPC · JPL
786663	2016 AS_{243}	—	January 3, 2016	Haleakala	Pan-STARRS 1	·	1.3 km	MPC · JPL
786664	2016 AM_{244}	—	February 26, 2012	Kitt Peak	Spacewatch	·	830 m	MPC · JPL
786665	2016 AR_{244}	—	January 3, 2016	Haleakala	Pan-STARRS 1	KOR	950 m	MPC · JPL
786666	2016 AT_{244}	—	January 27, 2011	Kitt Peak	Spacewatch	·	1.3 km	MPC · JPL
786667	2016 AU_{244}	—	February 5, 2011	Haleakala	Pan-STARRS 1	·	1.7 km	MPC · JPL
786668	2016 AX_{245}	—	September 18, 2014	Haleakala	Pan-STARRS 1	·	1.3 km	MPC · JPL
786669	2016 AY_{245}	—	June 6, 2013	Mount Lemmon	Mount Lemmon Survey	·	1.6 km	MPC · JPL
786670	2016 AQ_{246}	—	January 3, 2016	Mount Lemmon	Mount Lemmon Survey	EUN	970 m	MPC · JPL
786671	2016 AG_{247}	—	January 16, 2008	Kitt Peak	Spacewatch	·	1.1 km	MPC · JPL
786672	2016 AT_{247}	—	February 29, 2004	Kitt Peak	Spacewatch	BRG	1.1 km	MPC · JPL
786673	2016 AR_{248}	—	January 4, 2016	Haleakala	Pan-STARRS 1	·	1.3 km	MPC · JPL
786674	2016 AX_{248}	—	September 19, 2014	Haleakala	Pan-STARRS 1	·	1.2 km	MPC · JPL
786675	2016 AZ_{248}	—	January 2, 2012	Mount Lemmon	Mount Lemmon Survey	·	790 m	MPC · JPL
786676	2016 AC_{249}	—	March 13, 2012	Mount Lemmon	Mount Lemmon Survey	·	1.2 km	MPC · JPL
786677	2016 AE_{249}	—	March 24, 2012	Mount Lemmon	Mount Lemmon Survey	·	1.0 km	MPC · JPL
786678	2016 AF_{249}	—	January 4, 2016	Haleakala	Pan-STARRS 1	·	1.3 km	MPC · JPL
786679	2016 AL_{249}	—	September 17, 2014	Haleakala	Pan-STARRS 1	·	930 m	MPC · JPL
786680	2016 AS_{249}	—	November 10, 2010	Mount Lemmon	Mount Lemmon Survey	·	1.1 km	MPC · JPL
786681	2016 AB_{250}	—	January 4, 2016	Haleakala	Pan-STARRS 1	·	710 m	MPC · JPL
786682	2016 AE_{250}	—	February 24, 2012	Kitt Peak	Spacewatch	·	1.0 km	MPC · JPL
786683	2016 AL_{250}	—	April 29, 2012	Kitt Peak	Spacewatch	·	1.2 km	MPC · JPL
786684	2016 AT_{250}	—	March 23, 2003	Kitt Peak	Spacewatch	·	960 m	MPC · JPL
786685	2016 AM_{251}	—	January 4, 2016	Haleakala	Pan-STARRS 1	EOS	1.3 km	MPC · JPL
786686	2016 AN_{251}	—	March 29, 2012	Haleakala	Pan-STARRS 1	·	1.2 km	MPC · JPL
786687	2016 AY_{251}	—	February 7, 2011	Mount Lemmon	Mount Lemmon Survey	·	2.0 km	MPC · JPL
786688	2016 AH_{252}	—	November 25, 2010	Mount Lemmon	Mount Lemmon Survey	EUN	940 m	MPC · JPL
786689	2016 AO_{252}	—	November 13, 2010	Mount Lemmon	Mount Lemmon Survey	·	1.1 km	MPC · JPL
786690	2016 AX_{252}	—	January 4, 2016	Haleakala	Pan-STARRS 1	·	1.6 km	MPC · JPL
786691	2016 AJ_{253}	—	January 4, 2016	Haleakala	Pan-STARRS 1	·	2.0 km	MPC · JPL
786692	2016 AS_{253}	—	January 3, 2016	Mount Lemmon	Mount Lemmon Survey	·	2.0 km	MPC · JPL
786693	2016 AT_{253}	—	March 15, 2012	Mount Lemmon	Mount Lemmon Survey	·	1.1 km	MPC · JPL
786694	2016 AU_{253}	—	December 18, 2015	Mount Lemmon	Mount Lemmon Survey	·	970 m	MPC · JPL
786695	2016 AX_{253}	—	March 15, 2012	Mount Lemmon	Mount Lemmon Survey	·	1.0 km	MPC · JPL
786696	2016 AZ_{253}	—	January 5, 2016	Haleakala	Pan-STARRS 1	VER	1.8 km	MPC · JPL
786697	2016 AC_{254}	—	March 30, 2004	Kitt Peak	Spacewatch	·	1.2 km	MPC · JPL
786698	2016 AF_{254}	—	July 25, 2014	Haleakala	Pan-STARRS 1	·	1.1 km	MPC · JPL
786699	2016 AM_{254}	—	February 23, 2012	Mount Lemmon	Mount Lemmon Survey	MIS	1.7 km	MPC · JPL
786700	2016 AX_{254}	—	January 7, 2016	Haleakala	Pan-STARRS 1	·	1.3 km	MPC · JPL

== 786701–786800 ==
back to top

Designation			Discovery			Properties		Ref
Permanent	Provisional	Named after	Date	Site	Discoverer(s)	Category	Diam.	Ref
786701	2016 AB_{255}	—	January 7, 2016	Haleakala	Pan-STARRS 1	MAR	800 m	MPC · JPL
786702	2016 AO_{255}	—	September 18, 2014	Haleakala	Pan-STARRS 1	·	1.1 km	MPC · JPL
786703	2016 AC_{257}	—	February 25, 2011	Mount Lemmon	Mount Lemmon Survey	·	2.1 km	MPC · JPL
786704	2016 AC_{258}	—	January 7, 2016	Haleakala	Pan-STARRS 1	KOR	940 m	MPC · JPL
786705	2016 AP_{258}	—	October 17, 2010	Mount Lemmon	Mount Lemmon Survey	·	1.1 km	MPC · JPL
786706	2016 AK_{259}	—	November 16, 2014	Mount Lemmon	Mount Lemmon Survey	·	2.0 km	MPC · JPL
786707	2016 AL_{259}	—	September 20, 2014	Haleakala	Pan-STARRS 1	·	1.0 km	MPC · JPL
786708	2016 AS_{259}	—	September 19, 2014	Haleakala	Pan-STARRS 1	NEM	1.7 km	MPC · JPL
786709	2016 AZ_{259}	—	February 28, 2012	Haleakala	Pan-STARRS 1	·	1.2 km	MPC · JPL
786710	2016 AL_{260}	—	January 8, 2016	Haleakala	Pan-STARRS 1	EUN	1.1 km	MPC · JPL
786711	2016 AD_{264}	—	October 24, 2008	Kitt Peak	Spacewatch	VER	1.9 km	MPC · JPL
786712	2016 AU_{266}	—	January 10, 2016	Haleakala	Pan-STARRS 1	MAR	690 m	MPC · JPL
786713	2016 AA_{267}	—	January 25, 2012	Haleakala	Pan-STARRS 1	·	1.1 km	MPC · JPL
786714	2016 AJ_{267}	—	October 30, 2010	Mount Lemmon	Mount Lemmon Survey	·	1.5 km	MPC · JPL
786715	2016 AQ_{267}	—	March 25, 2012	Mount Lemmon	Mount Lemmon Survey	EUN	970 m	MPC · JPL
786716	2016 AQ_{268}	—	January 12, 2016	Haleakala	Pan-STARRS 1	·	1.2 km	MPC · JPL
786717	2016 AF_{269}	—	January 12, 2016	Haleakala	Pan-STARRS 1	MAR	780 m	MPC · JPL
786718	2016 AA_{270}	—	December 18, 2015	Mount Lemmon	Mount Lemmon Survey	·	1.3 km	MPC · JPL
786719	2016 AT_{270}	—	January 13, 2016	Haleakala	Pan-STARRS 1	BRA	1.2 km	MPC · JPL
786720	2016 AZ_{271}	—	December 20, 2014	Haleakala	Pan-STARRS 1	·	2.3 km	MPC · JPL
786721	2016 AL_{272}	—	October 19, 2010	Mount Lemmon	Mount Lemmon Survey	·	1.0 km	MPC · JPL
786722	2016 AZ_{272}	—	January 14, 2016	Haleakala	Pan-STARRS 1	·	980 m	MPC · JPL
786723	2016 AE_{273}	—	October 31, 2010	Mount Lemmon	Mount Lemmon Survey	·	950 m	MPC · JPL
786724	2016 AS_{273}	—	November 8, 2010	Mount Lemmon	Mount Lemmon Survey	·	1.0 km	MPC · JPL
786725	2016 AC_{274}	—	January 14, 2016	Haleakala	Pan-STARRS 1	·	1.4 km	MPC · JPL
786726	2016 AK_{275}	—	July 15, 2013	Haleakala	Pan-STARRS 1	·	1.2 km	MPC · JPL
786727	2016 AM_{275}	—	October 3, 2014	Mount Lemmon	Mount Lemmon Survey	·	2.2 km	MPC · JPL
786728	2016 AO_{276}	—	January 4, 2016	Haleakala	Pan-STARRS 1	·	1.6 km	MPC · JPL
786729	2016 AP_{276}	—	January 27, 2011	Mount Lemmon	Mount Lemmon Survey	·	1.9 km	MPC · JPL
786730	2016 AN_{277}	—	June 18, 2013	Haleakala	Pan-STARRS 1	·	1.3 km	MPC · JPL
786731	2016 AV_{277}	—	August 28, 2014	Haleakala	Pan-STARRS 1	·	1.1 km	MPC · JPL
786732	2016 AG_{281}	—	January 14, 2016	Haleakala	Pan-STARRS 1	DOR	1.7 km	MPC · JPL
786733	2016 AX_{282}	—	January 12, 2016	Haleakala	Pan-STARRS 1	·	1.3 km	MPC · JPL
786734	2016 AU_{285}	—	January 1, 2016	Haleakala	Pan-STARRS 1	·	1.1 km	MPC · JPL
786735	2016 AX_{285}	—	January 14, 2016	Haleakala	Pan-STARRS 1	·	1.6 km	MPC · JPL
786736	2016 AZ_{287}	—	January 7, 2016	Haleakala	Pan-STARRS 1	·	1.0 km	MPC · JPL
786737	2016 AE_{288}	—	January 3, 2016	Mount Lemmon	Mount Lemmon Survey	·	1.2 km	MPC · JPL
786738	2016 AJ_{290}	—	January 7, 2016	Haleakala	Pan-STARRS 1	·	1.2 km	MPC · JPL
786739	2016 AB_{292}	—	January 4, 2016	Haleakala	Pan-STARRS 1	·	1.2 km	MPC · JPL
786740	2016 AH_{294}	—	January 1, 2016	Mount Lemmon	Mount Lemmon Survey	GAL	1.3 km	MPC · JPL
786741	2016 AL_{297}	—	January 13, 2016	Mount Lemmon	Mount Lemmon Survey	·	1.3 km	MPC · JPL
786742	2016 AU_{297}	—	January 1, 2016	Haleakala	Pan-STARRS 1	·	960 m	MPC · JPL
786743	2016 AN_{299}	—	January 11, 2016	Haleakala	Pan-STARRS 1	DOR	1.4 km	MPC · JPL
786744	2016 AM_{301}	—	January 9, 2016	Haleakala	Pan-STARRS 1	·	2.1 km	MPC · JPL
786745	2016 AU_{301}	—	January 8, 2016	Haleakala	Pan-STARRS 1	(5)	920 m	MPC · JPL
786746	2016 AQ_{304}	—	January 1, 2016	Haleakala	Pan-STARRS 1	·	1.1 km	MPC · JPL
786747	2016 AS_{304}	—	January 14, 2016	Haleakala	Pan-STARRS 1	·	1.3 km	MPC · JPL
786748	2016 AR_{305}	—	January 4, 2016	Haleakala	Pan-STARRS 1	KOR	980 m	MPC · JPL
786749	2016 AF_{306}	—	January 11, 2016	Haleakala	Pan-STARRS 1	EOS	1.3 km	MPC · JPL
786750	2016 AK_{306}	—	January 9, 2016	Haleakala	Pan-STARRS 1	·	1.4 km	MPC · JPL
786751	2016 AQ_{308}	—	January 3, 2016	Haleakala	Pan-STARRS 1	·	1.1 km	MPC · JPL
786752	2016 AR_{308}	—	January 3, 2016	Haleakala	Pan-STARRS 1	·	1.1 km	MPC · JPL
786753	2016 AY_{308}	—	January 8, 2016	Mount Teide	A. Knöfel	·	1.2 km	MPC · JPL
786754	2016 AL_{311}	—	January 14, 2016	Haleakala	Pan-STARRS 1	·	1.3 km	MPC · JPL
786755	2016 AB_{313}	—	January 2, 2016	Haleakala	Pan-STARRS 1	·	1.1 km	MPC · JPL
786756	2016 AE_{313}	—	January 4, 2016	Haleakala	Pan-STARRS 1	·	990 m	MPC · JPL
786757	2016 AH_{313}	—	January 14, 2016	Haleakala	Pan-STARRS 1	·	2.2 km	MPC · JPL
786758	2016 AZ_{313}	—	January 4, 2016	Haleakala	Pan-STARRS 1	·	980 m	MPC · JPL
786759	2016 AP_{314}	—	January 4, 2016	Haleakala	Pan-STARRS 1	·	1.2 km	MPC · JPL
786760	2016 AQ_{315}	—	January 2, 2016	Mount Lemmon	Mount Lemmon Survey	·	1.0 km	MPC · JPL
786761	2016 AS_{315}	—	January 3, 2016	Haleakala	Pan-STARRS 1	·	1.1 km	MPC · JPL
786762	2016 AF_{316}	—	January 4, 2016	Haleakala	Pan-STARRS 1	·	1.2 km	MPC · JPL
786763	2016 AL_{316}	—	January 4, 2016	Haleakala	Pan-STARRS 1	KOR	1.0 km	MPC · JPL
786764	2016 AG_{319}	—	January 14, 2016	Haleakala	Pan-STARRS 1	·	1.1 km	MPC · JPL
786765	2016 AM_{319}	—	January 13, 2016	Mount Lemmon	Mount Lemmon Survey	·	1.1 km	MPC · JPL
786766	2016 AW_{319}	—	January 7, 2016	Haleakala	Pan-STARRS 1	·	1.2 km	MPC · JPL
786767	2016 AG_{320}	—	January 3, 2016	Mount Lemmon	Mount Lemmon Survey	·	1.4 km	MPC · JPL
786768	2016 AS_{322}	—	January 4, 2016	Haleakala	Pan-STARRS 1	·	1.5 km	MPC · JPL
786769	2016 AU_{322}	—	January 5, 2016	Haleakala	Pan-STARRS 1	·	1.1 km	MPC · JPL
786770	2016 AY_{322}	—	January 4, 2016	Haleakala	Pan-STARRS 1	·	1.0 km	MPC · JPL
786771	2016 AC_{323}	—	January 8, 2016	Haleakala	Pan-STARRS 1	AGN	740 m	MPC · JPL
786772	2016 AL_{323}	—	September 30, 2006	Apache Point	SDSS Collaboration	·	1.1 km	MPC · JPL
786773	2016 AE_{325}	—	January 4, 2016	Haleakala	Pan-STARRS 1	·	950 m	MPC · JPL
786774	2016 AP_{325}	—	January 3, 2016	Mount Lemmon	Mount Lemmon Survey	·	1.3 km	MPC · JPL
786775	2016 AR_{325}	—	January 3, 2016	Haleakala	Pan-STARRS 1	THM	1.4 km	MPC · JPL
786776	2016 AY_{328}	—	January 7, 2016	Haleakala	Pan-STARRS 1	TIR	2.2 km	MPC · JPL
786777	2016 AN_{331}	—	October 3, 2014	Mount Lemmon	Mount Lemmon Survey	·	1.5 km	MPC · JPL
786778	2016 AJ_{333}	—	January 7, 2016	Haleakala	Pan-STARRS 1	·	1.4 km	MPC · JPL
786779	2016 AL_{334}	—	January 7, 2016	Haleakala	Pan-STARRS 1	·	1.4 km	MPC · JPL
786780	2016 AW_{334}	—	January 13, 2016	Haleakala	Pan-STARRS 1	·	1.5 km	MPC · JPL
786781	2016 AE_{336}	—	January 3, 2016	Haleakala	Pan-STARRS 1	GEF	830 m	MPC · JPL
786782	2016 AT_{336}	—	January 7, 2016	Haleakala	Pan-STARRS 1	L5	5.9 km	MPC · JPL
786783	2016 AP_{338}	—	January 14, 2016	Haleakala	Pan-STARRS 1	AEO	850 m	MPC · JPL
786784	2016 AY_{338}	—	January 9, 2016	Haleakala	Pan-STARRS 1	·	1.1 km	MPC · JPL
786785	2016 AB_{339}	—	January 4, 2016	Haleakala	Pan-STARRS 1	·	1.4 km	MPC · JPL
786786	2016 AC_{339}	—	January 8, 2016	Mount Teide	E. Schwab	GAL	1.1 km	MPC · JPL
786787	2016 AF_{339}	—	January 12, 2016	Haleakala	Pan-STARRS 1	·	1.3 km	MPC · JPL
786788	2016 AN_{339}	—	January 2, 2016	Haleakala	Pan-STARRS 1	·	1.1 km	MPC · JPL
786789	2016 AG_{340}	—	January 11, 2016	Haleakala	Pan-STARRS 1	·	960 m	MPC · JPL
786790	2016 AT_{340}	—	January 7, 2016	Haleakala	Pan-STARRS 1	AST	1.2 km	MPC · JPL
786791	2016 AY_{340}	—	January 4, 2016	Haleakala	Pan-STARRS 1	·	1.3 km	MPC · JPL
786792	2016 AZ_{340}	—	January 15, 2016	Haleakala	Pan-STARRS 1	·	1.4 km	MPC · JPL
786793	2016 AK_{341}	—	January 4, 2016	Haleakala	Pan-STARRS 1	·	1.3 km	MPC · JPL
786794	2016 AA_{342}	—	January 3, 2016	Mount Lemmon	Mount Lemmon Survey	·	2.5 km	MPC · JPL
786795	2016 AD_{342}	—	January 14, 2016	Haleakala	Pan-STARRS 1	·	1.2 km	MPC · JPL
786796	2016 AH_{344}	—	January 4, 2016	Haleakala	Pan-STARRS 1	·	1.1 km	MPC · JPL
786797	2016 AA_{345}	—	January 14, 2016	Haleakala	Pan-STARRS 1	·	1.3 km	MPC · JPL
786798	2016 AB_{345}	—	January 3, 2016	Haleakala	Pan-STARRS 1	·	1.0 km	MPC · JPL
786799	2016 AC_{345}	—	January 8, 2016	Haleakala	Pan-STARRS 1	AGN	800 m	MPC · JPL
786800	2016 AH_{345}	—	January 14, 2016	Haleakala	Pan-STARRS 1	·	1.0 km	MPC · JPL

== 786801–786900 ==
back to top

Designation			Discovery			Properties		Ref
Permanent	Provisional	Named after	Date	Site	Discoverer(s)	Category	Diam.	Ref
786801	2016 AL_{345}	—	January 2, 2016	Mount Lemmon	Mount Lemmon Survey	·	1.4 km	MPC · JPL
786802	2016 AV_{345}	—	January 3, 2016	Haleakala	Pan-STARRS 1	AEO	630 m	MPC · JPL
786803	2016 AW_{345}	—	January 3, 2016	Haleakala	Pan-STARRS 1	·	1.1 km	MPC · JPL
786804	2016 AL_{346}	—	May 21, 2012	Haleakala	Pan-STARRS 1	·	1.4 km	MPC · JPL
786805	2016 AM_{346}	—	January 3, 2016	Haleakala	Pan-STARRS 1	JUN	610 m	MPC · JPL
786806	2016 AN_{346}	—	January 3, 2016	Haleakala	Pan-STARRS 1	·	1.6 km	MPC · JPL
786807	2016 AX_{346}	—	January 10, 2016	Haleakala	Pan-STARRS 1	HNS	780 m	MPC · JPL
786808	2016 AU_{348}	—	January 13, 2016	Mount Lemmon	Mount Lemmon Survey	·	1.4 km	MPC · JPL
786809	2016 AY_{348}	—	January 4, 2016	Haleakala	Pan-STARRS 1	·	1.2 km	MPC · JPL
786810	2016 AK_{349}	—	January 7, 2016	Haleakala	Pan-STARRS 1	·	1.6 km	MPC · JPL
786811	2016 AU_{349}	—	January 8, 2016	Haleakala	Pan-STARRS 1	KOR	980 m	MPC · JPL
786812	2016 AK_{350}	—	January 4, 2016	Haleakala	Pan-STARRS 1	3:2	3.4 km	MPC · JPL
786813	2016 AM_{350}	—	January 4, 2016	Haleakala	Pan-STARRS 1	·	1.2 km	MPC · JPL
786814	2016 AG_{351}	—	January 7, 2016	Haleakala	Pan-STARRS 1	·	1.4 km	MPC · JPL
786815	2016 AL_{351}	—	January 3, 2016	Haleakala	Pan-STARRS 1	·	1.1 km	MPC · JPL
786816	2016 AV_{351}	—	January 12, 2016	Haleakala	Pan-STARRS 1	·	960 m	MPC · JPL
786817	2016 AM_{352}	—	January 8, 2016	Haleakala	Pan-STARRS 1	EUN	810 m	MPC · JPL
786818	2016 AV_{354}	—	January 4, 2016	Haleakala	Pan-STARRS 1	·	1.0 km	MPC · JPL
786819	2016 AV_{355}	—	January 4, 2016	Haleakala	Pan-STARRS 1	ADE	1.5 km	MPC · JPL
786820	2016 AE_{356}	—	January 13, 2016	Haleakala	Pan-STARRS 1	·	1.4 km	MPC · JPL
786821	2016 AW_{356}	—	January 5, 2016	Haleakala	Pan-STARRS 1	·	1.3 km	MPC · JPL
786822	2016 AD_{357}	—	January 14, 2016	Haleakala	Pan-STARRS 1	·	1.2 km	MPC · JPL
786823	2016 AO_{358}	—	March 14, 2011	Mount Lemmon	Mount Lemmon Survey	·	1.5 km	MPC · JPL
786824	2016 AZ_{358}	—	January 14, 2016	Haleakala	Pan-STARRS 1	HNS	840 m	MPC · JPL
786825	2016 AB_{361}	—	January 4, 2016	Haleakala	Pan-STARRS 1	·	1.3 km	MPC · JPL
786826	2016 AD_{361}	—	January 14, 2016	Haleakala	Pan-STARRS 1	·	1.2 km	MPC · JPL
786827	2016 AE_{363}	—	January 4, 2016	Haleakala	Pan-STARRS 1	·	1.7 km	MPC · JPL
786828	2016 AU_{364}	—	September 18, 2014	Haleakala	Pan-STARRS 1	·	1.0 km	MPC · JPL
786829	2016 AY_{364}	—	January 12, 2016	Haleakala	Pan-STARRS 1	·	2.0 km	MPC · JPL
786830	2016 AF_{365}	—	January 4, 2016	Haleakala	Pan-STARRS 1	L5	5.7 km	MPC · JPL
786831	2016 AG_{366}	—	January 4, 2016	Haleakala	Pan-STARRS 1	HOF	1.8 km	MPC · JPL
786832	2016 AM_{366}	—	January 3, 2016	Mount Lemmon	Mount Lemmon Survey	AGN	860 m	MPC · JPL
786833	2016 AT_{370}	—	January 14, 2016	Haleakala	Pan-STARRS 1	·	2.1 km	MPC · JPL
786834	2016 AU_{372}	—	January 7, 2016	Haleakala	Pan-STARRS 1	EOS	1.3 km	MPC · JPL
786835	2016 AV_{372}	—	February 17, 2017	Haleakala	Pan-STARRS 1	·	3.0 km	MPC · JPL
786836	2016 AB_{373}	—	January 5, 2016	Haleakala	Pan-STARRS 1	3:2	4.2 km	MPC · JPL
786837	2016 AQ_{380}	—	January 4, 2016	Haleakala	Pan-STARRS 1	·	2.0 km	MPC · JPL
786838	2016 AU_{382}	—	January 4, 2016	Haleakala	Pan-STARRS 1	L5	7.8 km	MPC · JPL
786839	2016 AU_{383}	—	January 2, 2016	Mount Lemmon	Mount Lemmon Survey	·	1.3 km	MPC · JPL
786840	2016 AE_{384}	—	January 14, 2016	Haleakala	Pan-STARRS 1	·	1.6 km	MPC · JPL
786841	2016 AG_{384}	—	January 14, 2016	Haleakala	Pan-STARRS 1	·	1.4 km	MPC · JPL
786842	2016 AM_{385}	—	January 5, 2016	Haleakala	Pan-STARRS 1	·	1.3 km	MPC · JPL
786843	2016 AB_{386}	—	January 4, 2016	Haleakala	Pan-STARRS 1	·	1.3 km	MPC · JPL
786844	2016 AK_{386}	—	January 14, 2016	Haleakala	Pan-STARRS 1	·	1.3 km	MPC · JPL
786845	2016 AW_{388}	—	January 7, 2016	Haleakala	Pan-STARRS 1	KOR	900 m	MPC · JPL
786846	2016 AP_{389}	—	November 3, 2014	Mount Lemmon	Mount Lemmon Survey	·	1.3 km	MPC · JPL
786847	2016 AF_{390}	—	January 14, 2016	Haleakala	Pan-STARRS 1	·	1.2 km	MPC · JPL
786848	2016 AP_{394}	—	January 14, 2016	Haleakala	Pan-STARRS 1	·	1.2 km	MPC · JPL
786849	2016 AF_{398}	—	August 18, 2018	Haleakala	Pan-STARRS 1	·	1.2 km	MPC · JPL
786850	2016 AM_{400}	—	January 11, 2016	Haleakala	Pan-STARRS 1	·	1.3 km	MPC · JPL
786851	2016 BX_{2}	—	February 24, 2012	Mount Lemmon	Mount Lemmon Survey	·	1.4 km	MPC · JPL
786852	2016 BZ_{4}	—	January 18, 2016	Mount Lemmon	Mount Lemmon Survey	·	1.2 km	MPC · JPL
786853	2016 BU_{8}	—	January 18, 2016	Haleakala	Pan-STARRS 1	·	1.4 km	MPC · JPL
786854	2016 BC_{12}	—	December 4, 2015	Haleakala	Pan-STARRS 1	·	1.1 km	MPC · JPL
786855	2016 BD_{14}	—	January 25, 2016	Haleakala	Pan-STARRS 1	·	1.9 km	MPC · JPL
786856	2016 BB_{19}	—	January 3, 2016	Haleakala	Pan-STARRS 1	·	1.2 km	MPC · JPL
786857	2016 BZ_{23}	—	July 29, 2014	Haleakala	Pan-STARRS 1	·	1.5 km	MPC · JPL
786858	2016 BY_{24}	—	October 27, 2006	Mount Lemmon	Mount Lemmon Survey	·	960 m	MPC · JPL
786859	2016 BO_{26}	—	March 2, 2011	Mount Lemmon	Mount Lemmon Survey	·	1.8 km	MPC · JPL
786860	2016 BB_{27}	—	January 4, 2016	Haleakala	Pan-STARRS 1	·	1.4 km	MPC · JPL
786861	2016 BW_{27}	—	January 3, 2016	Haleakala	Pan-STARRS 1	·	2.2 km	MPC · JPL
786862	2016 BP_{31}	—	January 6, 2003	Kitt Peak	Deep Lens Survey	·	1.1 km	MPC · JPL
786863	2016 BF_{34}	—	April 7, 2008	Kitt Peak	Spacewatch	·	1.1 km	MPC · JPL
786864	2016 BM_{35}	—	March 3, 2005	Kitt Peak	Spacewatch	·	2.3 km	MPC · JPL
786865	2016 BE_{37}	—	January 8, 2016	Haleakala	Pan-STARRS 1	·	910 m	MPC · JPL
786866	2016 BZ_{37}	—	December 20, 2006	Mount Lemmon	Mount Lemmon Survey	CLO	1.2 km	MPC · JPL
786867	2016 BD_{40}	—	January 29, 2016	Mount Lemmon	Mount Lemmon Survey	·	1.4 km	MPC · JPL
786868	2016 BF_{41}	—	January 7, 2016	Haleakala	Pan-STARRS 1	·	1.2 km	MPC · JPL
786869	2016 BN_{43}	—	October 8, 2005	Kitt Peak	Spacewatch	·	1.2 km	MPC · JPL
786870	2016 BJ_{45}	—	July 13, 2013	Haleakala	Pan-STARRS 1	·	1.3 km	MPC · JPL
786871	2016 BH_{48}	—	January 2, 2016	Mount Lemmon	Mount Lemmon Survey	·	1.4 km	MPC · JPL
786872	2016 BT_{50}	—	October 3, 2010	Kitt Peak	Spacewatch	·	980 m	MPC · JPL
786873	2016 BW_{55}	—	January 30, 2016	Mount Lemmon	Mount Lemmon Survey	·	1.0 km	MPC · JPL
786874	2016 BR_{62}	—	January 4, 2016	Haleakala	Pan-STARRS 1	·	1.2 km	MPC · JPL
786875	2016 BO_{63}	—	February 26, 2012	Haleakala	Pan-STARRS 1	·	990 m	MPC · JPL
786876	2016 BX_{64}	—	July 6, 2005	Kitt Peak	Spacewatch	·	1.4 km	MPC · JPL
786877	2016 BL_{65}	—	January 31, 2016	Mount Lemmon	Mount Lemmon Survey	·	1.2 km	MPC · JPL
786878	2016 BX_{65}	—	January 31, 2016	Mount Lemmon	Mount Lemmon Survey	EOS	1.5 km	MPC · JPL
786879	2016 BH_{66}	—	January 17, 2016	Haleakala	Pan-STARRS 1	EUN	930 m	MPC · JPL
786880	2016 BN_{68}	—	January 31, 2016	Haleakala	Pan-STARRS 1	·	1.5 km	MPC · JPL
786881	2016 BJ_{69}	—	October 1, 2014	Haleakala	Pan-STARRS 1	·	1.3 km	MPC · JPL
786882	2016 BX_{69}	—	January 31, 2016	Haleakala	Pan-STARRS 1	·	1.3 km	MPC · JPL
786883	2016 BM_{71}	—	October 29, 2014	Haleakala	Pan-STARRS 1	·	1.9 km	MPC · JPL
786884	2016 BP_{71}	—	November 27, 2010	Mount Lemmon	Mount Lemmon Survey	·	970 m	MPC · JPL
786885	2016 BF_{72}	—	January 31, 2016	Haleakala	Pan-STARRS 1	·	1.1 km	MPC · JPL
786886	2016 BY_{73}	—	October 20, 2014	Mount Lemmon	Mount Lemmon Survey	·	1.2 km	MPC · JPL
786887	2016 BA_{75}	—	February 28, 2012	Haleakala	Pan-STARRS 1	·	1.1 km	MPC · JPL
786888	2016 BZ_{75}	—	January 31, 2016	Haleakala	Pan-STARRS 1	AEO	790 m	MPC · JPL
786889	2016 BJ_{76}	—	January 31, 2016	Haleakala	Pan-STARRS 1	·	1.0 km	MPC · JPL
786890	2016 BP_{76}	—	January 31, 2016	Haleakala	Pan-STARRS 1	EUN	860 m	MPC · JPL
786891	2016 BT_{76}	—	January 31, 2016	Haleakala	Pan-STARRS 1	JUN	830 m	MPC · JPL
786892	2016 BL_{77}	—	January 8, 2016	Haleakala	Pan-STARRS 1	·	1.2 km	MPC · JPL
786893	2016 BX_{77}	—	January 14, 2016	Haleakala	Pan-STARRS 1	·	1.4 km	MPC · JPL
786894	2016 BR_{78}	—	January 31, 2016	Haleakala	Pan-STARRS 1	GEF	720 m	MPC · JPL
786895	2016 BX_{78}	—	January 23, 2011	Mount Lemmon	Mount Lemmon Survey	KOR	1.0 km	MPC · JPL
786896	2016 BM_{87}	—	January 31, 2016	Haleakala	Pan-STARRS 1	·	1.5 km	MPC · JPL
786897	2016 BE_{88}	—	September 6, 2008	Mount Lemmon	Mount Lemmon Survey	·	2.3 km	MPC · JPL
786898	2016 BO_{88}	—	August 12, 2013	Haleakala	Pan-STARRS 1	·	1.2 km	MPC · JPL
786899	2016 BT_{88}	—	January 31, 2016	Haleakala	Pan-STARRS 1	·	940 m	MPC · JPL
786900	2016 BU_{88}	—	May 5, 2008	Mount Lemmon	Mount Lemmon Survey	EUN	780 m	MPC · JPL

== 786901–787000 ==
back to top

Designation			Discovery			Properties		Ref
Permanent	Provisional	Named after	Date	Site	Discoverer(s)	Category	Diam.	Ref
786901	2016 BV_{88}	—	February 1, 1995	Kitt Peak	Spacewatch	·	1.3 km	MPC · JPL
786902	2016 BG_{89}	—	January 16, 2016	Haleakala	Pan-STARRS 1	·	1.5 km	MPC · JPL
786903	2016 BP_{89}	—	January 17, 2016	Haleakala	Pan-STARRS 1	EUN	890 m	MPC · JPL
786904	2016 BV_{89}	—	December 20, 2014	Haleakala	Pan-STARRS 1	·	1.4 km	MPC · JPL
786905	2016 BV_{90}	—	February 21, 2012	Mount Lemmon	Mount Lemmon Survey	·	1.3 km	MPC · JPL
786906	2016 BP_{91}	—	November 11, 2010	Mount Lemmon	Mount Lemmon Survey	·	1.4 km	MPC · JPL
786907	2016 BO_{93}	—	January 30, 2016	Haleakala	Pan-STARRS 1	ADE	1.3 km	MPC · JPL
786908	2016 BL_{94}	—	March 9, 2011	Mount Lemmon	Mount Lemmon Survey	·	1.9 km	MPC · JPL
786909	2016 BP_{94}	—	June 17, 2013	Haleakala	Pan-STARRS 1	·	1.1 km	MPC · JPL
786910	2016 BV_{94}	—	January 16, 2016	Haleakala	Pan-STARRS 1	·	1.1 km	MPC · JPL
786911	2016 BC_{95}	—	March 6, 2011	Kitt Peak	Spacewatch	·	2.1 km	MPC · JPL
786912	2016 BD_{95}	—	January 16, 2016	Haleakala	Pan-STARRS 1	·	1.4 km	MPC · JPL
786913	2016 BK_{96}	—	January 17, 2016	Haleakala	Pan-STARRS 1	·	1.5 km	MPC · JPL
786914	2016 BO_{96}	—	January 17, 2016	Haleakala	Pan-STARRS 1	·	1.8 km	MPC · JPL
786915	2016 BB_{97}	—	April 25, 2012	Mount Lemmon	Mount Lemmon Survey	·	1.4 km	MPC · JPL
786916	2016 BE_{97}	—	January 17, 2016	Haleakala	Pan-STARRS 1	·	1.1 km	MPC · JPL
786917	2016 BH_{97}	—	October 24, 2005	Kitt Peak	Spacewatch	·	1.1 km	MPC · JPL
786918	2016 BE_{98}	—	January 17, 2016	Haleakala	Pan-STARRS 1	EOS	1.1 km	MPC · JPL
786919	2016 BW_{101}	—	September 6, 2013	Kitt Peak	Spacewatch	·	1.3 km	MPC · JPL
786920	2016 BP_{103}	—	January 29, 2016	Haleakala	Pan-STARRS 1	·	1.2 km	MPC · JPL
786921	2016 BW_{103}	—	January 30, 2016	Mount Lemmon	Mount Lemmon Survey	·	2.0 km	MPC · JPL
786922	2016 BK_{104}	—	January 30, 2016	Haleakala	Pan-STARRS 1	·	1.5 km	MPC · JPL
786923	2016 BC_{105}	—	February 27, 2012	Haleakala	Pan-STARRS 1	·	1.3 km	MPC · JPL
786924	2016 BJ_{105}	—	March 23, 2012	Mount Lemmon	Mount Lemmon Survey	·	1.1 km	MPC · JPL
786925	2016 BP_{105}	—	October 28, 2014	Haleakala	Pan-STARRS 1	·	1.3 km	MPC · JPL
786926	2016 BN_{107}	—	January 17, 2016	Haleakala	Pan-STARRS 1	·	1.2 km	MPC · JPL
786927	2016 BQ_{111}	—	January 17, 2016	Haleakala	Pan-STARRS 1	·	1.3 km	MPC · JPL
786928	2016 BU_{111}	—	November 22, 2005	Kitt Peak	Spacewatch	AGN	820 m	MPC · JPL
786929	2016 BJ_{112}	—	January 18, 2016	Haleakala	Pan-STARRS 1	EOS	1.2 km	MPC · JPL
786930	2016 BB_{113}	—	January 28, 2016	Mount Lemmon	Mount Lemmon Survey	VER	2.1 km	MPC · JPL
786931	2016 BP_{113}	—	January 18, 2016	Haleakala	Pan-STARRS 1	·	1.6 km	MPC · JPL
786932	2016 BQ_{113}	—	January 31, 2016	Haleakala	Pan-STARRS 1	·	2.3 km	MPC · JPL
786933	2016 BC_{114}	—	January 29, 2016	Haleakala	Pan-STARRS 1	·	1.2 km	MPC · JPL
786934	2016 BE_{114}	—	January 18, 2016	Haleakala	Pan-STARRS 1	·	1.1 km	MPC · JPL
786935	2016 BT_{115}	—	January 16, 2016	Haleakala	Pan-STARRS 1	·	2.1 km	MPC · JPL
786936	2016 BP_{116}	—	January 17, 2016	Haleakala	Pan-STARRS 1	·	2.4 km	MPC · JPL
786937	2016 BB_{117}	—	January 30, 2016	Mount Lemmon	Mount Lemmon Survey	·	1.2 km	MPC · JPL
786938	2016 BN_{118}	—	January 16, 2016	Haleakala	Pan-STARRS 1	VER	2.3 km	MPC · JPL
786939	2016 BO_{118}	—	January 17, 2016	Haleakala	Pan-STARRS 1	·	3.4 km	MPC · JPL
786940	2016 BC_{119}	—	January 29, 2016	Mount Lemmon	Mount Lemmon Survey	AGN	790 m	MPC · JPL
786941	2016 BG_{121}	—	January 31, 2016	Haleakala	Pan-STARRS 1	·	1.9 km	MPC · JPL
786942	2016 BP_{121}	—	January 31, 2016	Haleakala	Pan-STARRS 1	AGN	790 m	MPC · JPL
786943	2016 BT_{121}	—	December 2, 2010	Mount Lemmon	Mount Lemmon Survey	·	1.3 km	MPC · JPL
786944	2016 BX_{122}	—	January 31, 2016	Haleakala	Pan-STARRS 1	GEF	850 m	MPC · JPL
786945	2016 BU_{123}	—	January 18, 2016	Mount Lemmon	Mount Lemmon Survey	·	1.0 km	MPC · JPL
786946	2016 BB_{124}	—	December 2, 2005	Kitt Peak	Spacewatch	·	1.5 km	MPC · JPL
786947	2016 BO_{124}	—	January 31, 2016	Haleakala	Pan-STARRS 1	·	1.3 km	MPC · JPL
786948	2016 BQ_{124}	—	January 31, 2016	Haleakala	Pan-STARRS 1	EUN	900 m	MPC · JPL
786949	2016 BD_{125}	—	January 17, 2016	Haleakala	Pan-STARRS 1	AGN	800 m	MPC · JPL
786950	2016 BF_{125}	—	January 16, 2016	Haleakala	Pan-STARRS 1	·	1.3 km	MPC · JPL
786951	2016 BQ_{125}	—	January 31, 2016	Haleakala	Pan-STARRS 1	EOS	1.2 km	MPC · JPL
786952	2016 BM_{126}	—	January 30, 2016	Haleakala	Pan-STARRS 1	·	1.4 km	MPC · JPL
786953	2016 BY_{126}	—	January 31, 2016	Haleakala	Pan-STARRS 1	·	1.0 km	MPC · JPL
786954	2016 BG_{127}	—	January 18, 2016	Haleakala	Pan-STARRS 1	·	1.5 km	MPC · JPL
786955	2016 BX_{127}	—	January 31, 2016	Haleakala	Pan-STARRS 1	·	1.1 km	MPC · JPL
786956	2016 BD_{128}	—	January 16, 2016	Haleakala	Pan-STARRS 1	·	1.4 km	MPC · JPL
786957	2016 BX_{128}	—	January 19, 2016	Haleakala	Pan-STARRS 1	·	1.3 km	MPC · JPL
786958	2016 BB_{131}	—	January 31, 2016	Haleakala	Pan-STARRS 1	HOF	1.8 km	MPC · JPL
786959	2016 BS_{131}	—	January 29, 2016	Mount Lemmon	Mount Lemmon Survey	·	1.4 km	MPC · JPL
786960	2016 BW_{131}	—	September 25, 2009	Kitt Peak	Spacewatch	KOR	950 m	MPC · JPL
786961	2016 BW_{132}	—	January 29, 2016	Haleakala	Pan-STARRS 1	·	1.3 km	MPC · JPL
786962	2016 BP_{133}	—	January 17, 2016	Haleakala	Pan-STARRS 1	·	1.2 km	MPC · JPL
786963	2016 BF_{134}	—	October 29, 2014	Kitt Peak	Spacewatch	EOS	1.2 km	MPC · JPL
786964	2016 BG_{135}	—	January 30, 2016	Mount Lemmon	Mount Lemmon Survey	HOF	1.9 km	MPC · JPL
786965	2016 BJ_{135}	—	January 31, 2016	Haleakala	Pan-STARRS 1	·	1.2 km	MPC · JPL
786966	2016 BL_{136}	—	January 18, 2016	Haleakala	Pan-STARRS 1	·	2.0 km	MPC · JPL
786967	2016 BJ_{139}	—	January 31, 2016	Haleakala	Pan-STARRS 1	·	1.4 km	MPC · JPL
786968	2016 BG_{141}	—	January 30, 2016	Mount Lemmon	Mount Lemmon Survey	WIT	670 m	MPC · JPL
786969	2016 BC_{146}	—	January 31, 2016	Haleakala	Pan-STARRS 1	·	1.8 km	MPC · JPL
786970	2016 CW	—	January 17, 2016	Haleakala	Pan-STARRS 1	3:2 · SHU	4.4 km	MPC · JPL
786971	2016 CB_{3}	—	October 30, 2005	Mount Lemmon	Mount Lemmon Survey	HOF	1.6 km	MPC · JPL
786972	2016 CW_{4}	—	January 30, 2016	Mount Lemmon	Mount Lemmon Survey	·	930 m	MPC · JPL
786973	2016 CG_{6}	—	February 1, 2016	Haleakala	Pan-STARRS 1	AEO	640 m	MPC · JPL
786974	2016 CK_{8}	—	February 1, 2016	Haleakala	Pan-STARRS 1	GEF	820 m	MPC · JPL
786975	2016 CO_{15}	—	August 27, 2014	Haleakala	Pan-STARRS 1	·	1.3 km	MPC · JPL
786976	2016 CT_{15}	—	October 20, 2008	Mount Lemmon	Mount Lemmon Survey	·	2.2 km	MPC · JPL
786977	2016 CW_{15}	—	February 1, 2016	Haleakala	Pan-STARRS 1	HOF	1.5 km	MPC · JPL
786978	2016 CR_{16}	—	February 1, 2016	Haleakala	Pan-STARRS 1	MRX	740 m	MPC · JPL
786979	2016 CP_{19}	—	January 4, 2016	Haleakala	Pan-STARRS 1	3:2	4.8 km	MPC · JPL
786980	2016 CS_{22}	—	February 2, 2016	Haleakala	Pan-STARRS 1	·	1.1 km	MPC · JPL
786981	2016 CE_{24}	—	February 27, 2012	Haleakala	Pan-STARRS 1	·	1.2 km	MPC · JPL
786982	2016 CR_{25}	—	December 4, 2005	Kitt Peak	Spacewatch	·	1.4 km	MPC · JPL
786983	2016 CH_{34}	—	July 13, 2013	Haleakala	Pan-STARRS 1	·	1.5 km	MPC · JPL
786984	2016 CQ_{35}	—	October 23, 2006	Mount Lemmon	Mount Lemmon Survey	(5)	960 m	MPC · JPL
786985	2016 CW_{37}	—	January 10, 2007	Mount Lemmon	Mount Lemmon Survey	·	1.4 km	MPC · JPL
786986	2016 CA_{38}	—	February 14, 2007	Mauna Kea	P. A. Wiegert	·	960 m	MPC · JPL
786987	2016 CJ_{42}	—	January 7, 2016	Haleakala	Pan-STARRS 1	·	1.3 km	MPC · JPL
786988	2016 CQ_{43}	—	February 19, 2012	Kitt Peak	Spacewatch	EUN	780 m	MPC · JPL
786989	2016 CK_{45}	—	March 28, 2012	Kitt Peak	Spacewatch	·	1.3 km	MPC · JPL
786990	2016 CO_{45}	—	February 27, 2012	Haleakala	Pan-STARRS 1	·	1.3 km	MPC · JPL
786991	2016 CK_{50}	—	January 14, 2016	Haleakala	Pan-STARRS 1	·	1.3 km	MPC · JPL
786992	2016 CP_{52}	—	February 3, 2016	Haleakala	Pan-STARRS 1	·	1.3 km	MPC · JPL
786993	2016 CD_{53}	—	August 3, 2014	Haleakala	Pan-STARRS 1	·	1.2 km	MPC · JPL
786994	2016 CH_{53}	—	February 3, 2016	Haleakala	Pan-STARRS 1	·	1.1 km	MPC · JPL
786995	2016 CU_{53}	—	January 8, 2016	Haleakala	Pan-STARRS 1	EOS	1.3 km	MPC · JPL
786996	2016 CX_{54}	—	April 27, 2012	Haleakala	Pan-STARRS 1	AEO	910 m	MPC · JPL
786997	2016 CC_{59}	—	February 3, 2016	Haleakala	Pan-STARRS 1	·	1.5 km	MPC · JPL
786998	2016 CF_{61}	—	April 15, 2008	Mount Lemmon	Mount Lemmon Survey	·	1.1 km	MPC · JPL
786999	2016 CG_{61}	—	February 3, 2016	Haleakala	Pan-STARRS 1	·	1.9 km	MPC · JPL
787000	2016 CP_{62}	—	February 3, 2016	Haleakala	Pan-STARRS 1	·	1.5 km	MPC · JPL

back to top
