= List of minor planets: 823001–824000 =

The following is a partial list of minor planets, running from minor-planet number 823001 through 824000, inclusive. The primary data for this and other partial lists is based on JPL's "Small-Body Orbital Elements" and data available from the Minor Planet Center. Critical list information is also provided by the MPC, unless otherwise specified from Lowell Observatory. A detailed description of the table's columns and additional sources are given on the main page including a complete list of every page in this series, and a statistical break-up on the dynamical classification of minor planets.

Also see the summary list of all named bodies in numerical and alphabetical order, and the corresponding naming citations for the number range of this particular list. New namings may only be added to this list after official publication, as the preannouncement of names is condemned by the Working Group for Small Bodies Nomenclature of the International Astronomical Union.

Near-Earth obj.	MBA (inner)	MBA (outer)	Centaur
Mars-crosser	MBA (middle)	Jupiter trojan	Trans-Neptunian obj.
Unclassified

== 823001–823100 ==
Designation			Discovery			Properties		Ref
Permanent	Provisional	Named after	Date	Site	Discoverer(s)	Category	Diam.	Ref
823001	2015 XB_{387}	—	December 5, 2015	Haleakala	Pan-STARRS 1	H	370 m	MPC · JPL
823002	2015 XD_{387}	—	December 6, 2015	Mount Lemmon	Mount Lemmon Survey	H	400 m	MPC · JPL
823003	2015 XQ_{387}	—	December 13, 2015	Haleakala	Pan-STARRS 1	H	380 m	MPC · JPL
823004	2015 XE_{388}	—	December 4, 2015	Haleakala	Pan-STARRS 1	H	470 m	MPC · JPL
823005	2015 XL_{389}	—	December 14, 2004	Kitt Peak	Spacewatch	·	2.3 km	MPC · JPL
823006	2015 XC_{390}	—	December 7, 2015	Haleakala	Pan-STARRS 1	·	1.8 km	MPC · JPL
823007	2015 XK_{398}	—	December 9, 2015	Haleakala	Pan-STARRS 1	·	940 m	MPC · JPL
823008	2015 XM_{399}	—	December 7, 2014	Haleakala	Pan-STARRS 1	·	2.4 km	MPC · JPL
823009	2015 XT_{401}	—	December 9, 2015	Calar Alto-CASADO	Hellmich, S., Mottola, S.	·	1.1 km	MPC · JPL
823010	2015 XK_{402}	—	December 13, 2015	Haleakala	Pan-STARRS 1	·	990 m	MPC · JPL
823011	2015 XD_{406}	—	February 12, 2011	Mount Lemmon	Mount Lemmon Survey	·	2.1 km	MPC · JPL
823012	2015 XY_{408}	—	December 3, 2015	Mount Lemmon	Mount Lemmon Survey	EOS	1.3 km	MPC · JPL
823013	2015 XL_{411}	—	December 8, 2015	Mount Lemmon	Mount Lemmon Survey	·	1.0 km	MPC · JPL
823014	2015 XL_{413}	—	December 9, 2015	Haleakala	Pan-STARRS 1	·	770 m	MPC · JPL
823015	2015 XT_{414}	—	December 9, 2015	Haleakala	Pan-STARRS 1	·	850 m	MPC · JPL
823016	2015 XU_{414}	—	November 22, 2014	Haleakala	Pan-STARRS 1	ELF	2.3 km	MPC · JPL
823017	2015 XE_{415}	—	February 27, 2012	Haleakala	Pan-STARRS 1	(5)	990 m	MPC · JPL
823018	2015 XW_{416}	—	December 13, 2015	Haleakala	Pan-STARRS 1	·	3.2 km	MPC · JPL
823019	2015 XD_{417}	—	December 13, 2015	Haleakala	Pan-STARRS 1	·	760 m	MPC · JPL
823020	2015 XM_{417}	—	December 13, 2015	Haleakala	Pan-STARRS 1	·	3.0 km	MPC · JPL
823021	2015 XO_{417}	—	October 25, 2014	Mount Lemmon	Mount Lemmon Survey	TIR	1.9 km	MPC · JPL
823022	2015 XT_{417}	—	December 13, 2015	Haleakala	Pan-STARRS 1	EUN	710 m	MPC · JPL
823023	2015 XE_{422}	—	December 7, 2015	Haleakala	Pan-STARRS 1	H	440 m	MPC · JPL
823024	2015 XW_{422}	—	December 9, 2015	Haleakala	Pan-STARRS 1	URS	2.8 km	MPC · JPL
823025	2015 XY_{422}	—	December 3, 2015	Mount Lemmon	Mount Lemmon Survey	·	2.1 km	MPC · JPL
823026	2015 XL_{423}	—	December 6, 2015	Mount Lemmon	Mount Lemmon Survey	ADE	1.5 km	MPC · JPL
823027	2015 XR_{424}	—	December 6, 2015	Mount Lemmon	Mount Lemmon Survey	PHO	1.0 km	MPC · JPL
823028	2015 XP_{427}	—	December 4, 2015	Haleakala	Pan-STARRS 1	EUN	940 m	MPC · JPL
823029	2015 XW_{427}	—	December 6, 2015	Mount Lemmon	Mount Lemmon Survey	MAR	860 m	MPC · JPL
823030	2015 XT_{431}	—	December 9, 2015	Haleakala	Pan-STARRS 1	H	400 m	MPC · JPL
823031	2015 XK_{434}	—	December 13, 2015	Haleakala	Pan-STARRS 1	H	470 m	MPC · JPL
823032	2015 XH_{435}	—	December 9, 2015	Haleakala	Pan-STARRS 1	EUP	3.3 km	MPC · JPL
823033	2015 XE_{436}	—	January 18, 2008	Kitt Peak	Spacewatch	·	740 m	MPC · JPL
823034	2015 XO_{438}	—	December 7, 2015	Haleakala	Pan-STARRS 1	·	2.3 km	MPC · JPL
823035	2015 XQ_{438}	—	December 5, 2015	Haleakala	Pan-STARRS 1	·	910 m	MPC · JPL
823036	2015 XB_{443}	—	December 4, 2015	Haleakala	Pan-STARRS 1	·	750 m	MPC · JPL
823037	2015 XU_{443}	—	December 7, 2015	Haleakala	Pan-STARRS 1	·	1.0 km	MPC · JPL
823038	2015 XG_{444}	—	December 9, 2015	Haleakala	Pan-STARRS 1	·	710 m	MPC · JPL
823039	2015 XL_{445}	—	December 13, 2015	Haleakala	Pan-STARRS 1	·	990 m	MPC · JPL
823040	2015 XC_{448}	—	December 14, 2015	Mount Lemmon	Mount Lemmon Survey	H	540 m	MPC · JPL
823041	2015 XR_{450}	—	December 9, 2015	Haleakala	Pan-STARRS 1	·	1.0 km	MPC · JPL
823042	2015 XS_{455}	—	December 6, 2015	Haleakala	Pan-STARRS 1	VER	2.3 km	MPC · JPL
823043	2015 XQ_{457}	—	December 7, 2015	Haleakala	Pan-STARRS 1	·	2.6 km	MPC · JPL
823044	2015 XG_{460}	—	December 9, 2015	Mount Lemmon	Mount Lemmon Survey	·	2.2 km	MPC · JPL
823045	2015 XS_{466}	—	December 9, 2015	Haleakala	Pan-STARRS 1	H	340 m	MPC · JPL
823046	2015 XC_{467}	—	December 13, 2015	Haleakala	Pan-STARRS 1	L5	7.9 km	MPC · JPL
823047	2015 XQ_{471}	—	December 7, 2015	Haleakala	Pan-STARRS 1	·	760 m	MPC · JPL
823048	2015 XN_{473}	—	December 5, 2015	Haleakala	Pan-STARRS 1	·	2.5 km	MPC · JPL
823049	2015 XB_{474}	—	December 8, 2015	Haleakala	Pan-STARRS 1	·	890 m	MPC · JPL
823050	2015 XK_{474}	—	December 1, 2015	Haleakala	Pan-STARRS 1	·	650 m	MPC · JPL
823051	2015 XG_{481}	—	December 4, 2015	Haleakala	Pan-STARRS 1	·	1 km	MPC · JPL
823052	2015 XT_{481}	—	December 14, 2015	Haleakala	Pan-STARRS 1	·	1.5 km	MPC · JPL
823053	2015 XP_{483}	—	August 31, 2014	Haleakala	Pan-STARRS 1	·	1.0 km	MPC · JPL
823054	2015 XG_{484}	—	December 3, 2015	Haleakala	Pan-STARRS 1	H	370 m	MPC · JPL
823055	2015 XZ_{484}	—	December 8, 2015	Haleakala	Pan-STARRS 1	·	760 m	MPC · JPL
823056	2015 XP_{495}	—	December 2, 2015	Haleakala	Pan-STARRS 1	NYS	670 m	MPC · JPL
823057	2015 XH_{500}	—	December 1, 2015	Haleakala	Pan-STARRS 1	H	410 m	MPC · JPL
823058	2015 YV	—	November 30, 2011	Catalina	CSS	·	1.9 km	MPC · JPL
823059	2015 YD_{3}	—	February 9, 2011	Mount Lemmon	Mount Lemmon Survey	·	2.3 km	MPC · JPL
823060	2015 YV_{6}	—	December 31, 2008	Mount Lemmon	Mount Lemmon Survey	·	600 m	MPC · JPL
823061	2015 YS_{17}	—	November 10, 2014	Haleakala	Pan-STARRS 1	·	2.6 km	MPC · JPL
823062	2015 YR_{19}	—	August 19, 2014	Haleakala	Pan-STARRS 1	TIR	2.1 km	MPC · JPL
823063	2015 YR_{21}	—	December 19, 2015	Mount Lemmon	Mount Lemmon Survey	H	370 m	MPC · JPL
823064	2015 YW_{21}	—	December 31, 2015	Haleakala	Pan-STARRS 1	H	370 m	MPC · JPL
823065	2015 YP_{23}	—	December 18, 2015	Mount Lemmon	Mount Lemmon Survey	·	1.3 km	MPC · JPL
823066	2015 YN_{24}	—	November 9, 2014	Mount Lemmon	Mount Lemmon Survey	·	2.5 km	MPC · JPL
823067	2015 YU_{24}	—	December 18, 2015	Mount Lemmon	Mount Lemmon Survey	·	2.8 km	MPC · JPL
823068	2015 YC_{25}	—	December 18, 2015	Kitt Peak	Spacewatch	·	2.5 km	MPC · JPL
823069	2015 YM_{27}	—	December 30, 2015	Mount Lemmon	Mount Lemmon Survey	·	2.6 km	MPC · JPL
823070	2015 YC_{28}	—	December 18, 2015	Kitt Peak	Spacewatch	·	3.1 km	MPC · JPL
823071	2015 YM_{29}	—	May 11, 2008	Kitt Peak	Spacewatch	·	1.0 km	MPC · JPL
823072	2015 YL_{30}	—	December 17, 2015	Mount Lemmon	Mount Lemmon Survey	H	400 m	MPC · JPL
823073	2015 YR_{32}	—	December 16, 2015	Mount Lemmon	Mount Lemmon Survey	·	940 m	MPC · JPL
823074	2015 YU_{38}	—	December 31, 2015	Haleakala	Pan-STARRS 1	L5	6.5 km	MPC · JPL
823075	2016 AA_{1}	—	September 14, 2007	Kitt Peak	Spacewatch	·	1.0 km	MPC · JPL
823076	2016 AV_{1}	—	October 17, 2011	Piszkés-tető	K. Sárneczky, A. Szing	·	990 m	MPC · JPL
823077	2016 AO_{4}	—	November 6, 2015	Mount Lemmon	Mount Lemmon Survey	·	2.3 km	MPC · JPL
823078	2016 AU_{6}	—	December 19, 2015	Mount Lemmon	Mount Lemmon Survey	·	2.5 km	MPC · JPL
823079	2016 AP_{7}	—	January 2, 2016	Haleakala	Pan-STARRS 1	·	2.7 km	MPC · JPL
823080	2016 AC_{10}	—	February 10, 2002	Kitt Peak	Spacewatch	·	710 m	MPC · JPL
823081	2016 AD_{10}	—	January 20, 2012	Haleakala	Pan-STARRS 1	·	1.5 km	MPC · JPL
823082	2016 AZ_{10}	—	January 2, 2016	Haleakala	Pan-STARRS 1	·	2.2 km	MPC · JPL
823083	2016 AO_{17}	—	December 3, 2015	Mount Lemmon	Mount Lemmon Survey	NYS	980 m	MPC · JPL
823084	2016 AH_{18}	—	November 20, 2004	Kitt Peak	Spacewatch	MAS	600 m	MPC · JPL
823085	2016 AM_{18}	—	April 12, 2013	Haleakala	Pan-STARRS 1	·	1.0 km	MPC · JPL
823086	2016 AT_{22}	—	November 15, 2011	Mount Lemmon	Mount Lemmon Survey	·	750 m	MPC · JPL
823087	2016 AZ_{23}	—	August 20, 2014	Haleakala	Pan-STARRS 1	·	1.2 km	MPC · JPL
823088	2016 AO_{24}	—	September 20, 2003	Kitt Peak	Spacewatch	·	960 m	MPC · JPL
823089	2016 AD_{26}	—	January 16, 2009	Mount Lemmon	Mount Lemmon Survey	·	440 m	MPC · JPL
823090	2016 AT_{32}	—	December 18, 2015	Mount Lemmon	Mount Lemmon Survey	·	2.2 km	MPC · JPL
823091	2016 AW_{39}	—	November 17, 2011	Mount Lemmon	Mount Lemmon Survey	MAS	540 m	MPC · JPL
823092	2016 AL_{48}	—	January 2, 2011	Mount Lemmon	Mount Lemmon Survey	·	1.1 km	MPC · JPL
823093	2016 AQ_{58}	—	February 20, 2009	Kitt Peak	Spacewatch	·	750 m	MPC · JPL
823094	2016 AL_{71}	—	December 14, 2015	Haleakala	Pan-STARRS 1	·	1.3 km	MPC · JPL
823095	2016 AD_{78}	—	January 4, 2016	Haleakala	Pan-STARRS 1	·	960 m	MPC · JPL
823096	2016 AD_{80}	—	February 8, 2008	Kitt Peak	Spacewatch	·	930 m	MPC · JPL
823097	2016 AT_{84}	—	January 7, 2016	Haleakala	Pan-STARRS 1	·	1.6 km	MPC · JPL
823098	2016 AD_{85}	—	January 3, 2016	Haleakala	Pan-STARRS 1	·	2.2 km	MPC · JPL
823099	2016 AQ_{85}	—	October 23, 2004	Kitt Peak	Spacewatch	MAS	510 m	MPC · JPL
823100	2016 AH_{86}	—	September 4, 2014	Haleakala	Pan-STARRS 1	·	2.7 km	MPC · JPL

== 823101–823200 ==
back to top

Designation			Discovery			Properties		Ref
Permanent	Provisional	Named after	Date	Site	Discoverer(s)	Category	Diam.	Ref
823101	2016 AF_{96}	—	December 16, 2015	Mount Lemmon	Mount Lemmon Survey	·	2.4 km	MPC · JPL
823102	2016 AR_{96}	—	January 3, 2016	Haleakala	Pan-STARRS 1	·	2.2 km	MPC · JPL
823103	2016 AA_{97}	—	January 7, 2016	Haleakala	Pan-STARRS 1	VER	2.0 km	MPC · JPL
823104	2016 AB_{101}	—	August 30, 2011	Haleakala	Pan-STARRS 1	·	570 m	MPC · JPL
823105	2016 AE_{106}	—	January 7, 2016	Haleakala	Pan-STARRS 1	THM	1.8 km	MPC · JPL
823106	2016 AR_{106}	—	December 17, 2015	Haleakala	Pan-STARRS 1	H	440 m	MPC · JPL
823107	2016 AH_{107}	—	May 2, 2008	Kitt Peak	Spacewatch	·	1.2 km	MPC · JPL
823108	2016 AA_{114}	—	March 4, 2005	Mount Lemmon	Mount Lemmon Survey	·	2.1 km	MPC · JPL
823109	2016 AP_{118}	—	November 14, 2015	Mount Lemmon	Mount Lemmon Survey	H	450 m	MPC · JPL
823110	2016 AQ_{120}	—	February 25, 2012	Mount Lemmon	Mount Lemmon Survey	·	1.1 km	MPC · JPL
823111	2016 AN_{126}	—	January 3, 2016	Mount Lemmon	Mount Lemmon Survey	·	1.1 km	MPC · JPL
823112	2016 AD_{127}	—	November 17, 2014	Haleakala	Pan-STARRS 1	·	2.2 km	MPC · JPL
823113	2016 AP_{129}	—	January 21, 2013	Haleakala	Pan-STARRS 1	H	490 m	MPC · JPL
823114	2016 AZ_{133}	—	March 14, 2011	Mount Lemmon	Mount Lemmon Survey	·	2.2 km	MPC · JPL
823115	2016 AE_{134}	—	December 13, 2015	Haleakala	Pan-STARRS 1	H	310 m	MPC · JPL
823116	2016 AN_{139}	—	August 29, 2014	Haleakala	Pan-STARRS 1	EUN	840 m	MPC · JPL
823117	2016 AL_{140}	—	June 2, 2014	Haleakala	Pan-STARRS 1	·	970 m	MPC · JPL
823118	2016 AZ_{140}	—	October 28, 2014	Haleakala	Pan-STARRS 1	·	1.9 km	MPC · JPL
823119	2016 AA_{141}	—	July 16, 2013	Haleakala	Pan-STARRS 1	·	1.5 km	MPC · JPL
823120	2016 AC_{144}	—	September 25, 2014	Catalina	CSS	THB	2.4 km	MPC · JPL
823121	2016 AT_{151}	—	December 5, 2015	Haleakala	Pan-STARRS 1	·	910 m	MPC · JPL
823122	2016 AE_{153}	—	January 11, 2016	Haleakala	Pan-STARRS 1	HNS	790 m	MPC · JPL
823123	2016 AW_{153}	—	April 16, 2013	Haleakala	Pan-STARRS 1	PHO	640 m	MPC · JPL
823124	2016 AU_{161}	—	March 12, 2008	Mount Lemmon	Mount Lemmon Survey	·	1.1 km	MPC · JPL
823125	2016 AO_{171}	—	December 6, 2015	Haleakala	Pan-STARRS 1	H	460 m	MPC · JPL
823126	2016 AS_{171}	—	February 20, 2012	Haleakala	Pan-STARRS 1	·	760 m	MPC · JPL
823127	2016 AG_{177}	—	January 11, 2016	Haleakala	Pan-STARRS 1	EUN	970 m	MPC · JPL
823128	2016 AY_{180}	—	January 11, 2016	Haleakala	Pan-STARRS 1	·	1.2 km	MPC · JPL
823129	2016 AB_{181}	—	March 16, 2012	Mount Lemmon	Mount Lemmon Survey	·	1.0 km	MPC · JPL
823130	2016 AQ_{181}	—	November 15, 2006	Mount Lemmon	Mount Lemmon Survey	·	960 m	MPC · JPL
823131	2016 AZ_{191}	—	August 9, 2013	Haleakala	Pan-STARRS 1	·	2.7 km	MPC · JPL
823132	2016 AJ_{192}	—	January 20, 2009	Catalina	CSS	·	580 m	MPC · JPL
823133	2016 AL_{198}	—	January 20, 2008	Mount Lemmon	Mount Lemmon Survey	H	280 m	MPC · JPL
823134	2016 AJ_{200}	—	January 1, 2016	Mount Lemmon	Mount Lemmon Survey	·	930 m	MPC · JPL
823135	2016 AF_{203}	—	January 3, 2016	Haleakala	Pan-STARRS 1	·	730 m	MPC · JPL
823136	2016 AU_{205}	—	January 4, 2016	Haleakala	Pan-STARRS 1	·	2.9 km	MPC · JPL
823137	2016 AX_{209}	—	January 8, 2016	Haleakala	Pan-STARRS 1	EUN	770 m	MPC · JPL
823138	2016 AX_{214}	—	May 31, 2006	Mount Lemmon	Mount Lemmon Survey	·	2.1 km	MPC · JPL
823139	2016 AQ_{215}	—	January 15, 2016	Haleakala	Pan-STARRS 1	URS	2.9 km	MPC · JPL
823140	2016 AE_{220}	—	November 11, 2004	Kitt Peak	Spacewatch	·	1.9 km	MPC · JPL
823141	2016 AE_{222}	—	January 9, 2016	Haleakala	Pan-STARRS 1	·	1.3 km	MPC · JPL
823142	2016 AO_{227}	—	March 16, 2008	Kitt Peak	Spacewatch	·	960 m	MPC · JPL
823143	2016 AJ_{232}	—	January 11, 2016	Haleakala	Pan-STARRS 1	PHO	640 m	MPC · JPL
823144	2016 AL_{233}	—	January 3, 2016	Haleakala	Pan-STARRS 1	·	2.5 km	MPC · JPL
823145	2016 AD_{238}	—	February 15, 2002	Cerro Tololo	Deep Lens Survey	·	740 m	MPC · JPL
823146	2016 AD_{239}	—	December 4, 2015	Haleakala	Pan-STARRS 1	·	2.3 km	MPC · JPL
823147	2016 AL_{242}	—	July 20, 2002	Palomar	NEAT	·	3.4 km	MPC · JPL
823148	2016 AU_{243}	—	February 29, 2008	Kitt Peak	Spacewatch	·	930 m	MPC · JPL
823149	2016 AJ_{245}	—	January 3, 2016	Haleakala	Pan-STARRS 1	·	2.2 km	MPC · JPL
823150	2016 AW_{246}	—	May 4, 2006	Kitt Peak	Spacewatch	·	2.0 km	MPC · JPL
823151	2016 AN_{248}	—	August 23, 2014	Haleakala	Pan-STARRS 1	·	2.3 km	MPC · JPL
823152	2016 AP_{249}	—	October 30, 2014	Mount Lemmon	Mount Lemmon Survey	·	2.4 km	MPC · JPL
823153	2016 AT_{249}	—	January 4, 2016	Haleakala	Pan-STARRS 1	·	670 m	MPC · JPL
823154	2016 AC_{251}	—	September 29, 2014	Haleakala	Pan-STARRS 1	·	1.4 km	MPC · JPL
823155	2016 AE_{252}	—	November 27, 2014	Haleakala	Pan-STARRS 1	·	2.4 km	MPC · JPL
823156	2016 AE_{258}	—	February 5, 2011	Haleakala	Pan-STARRS 1	·	1.7 km	MPC · JPL
823157	2016 AG_{258}	—	October 17, 2010	Mount Lemmon	Mount Lemmon Survey	·	1.1 km	MPC · JPL
823158	2016 AV_{260}	—	May 1, 2008	Kitt Peak	Spacewatch	ADE	1.8 km	MPC · JPL
823159	2016 AG_{263}	—	January 6, 2010	Kitt Peak	Spacewatch	THM	1.9 km	MPC · JPL
823160	2016 AN_{266}	—	November 22, 2014	Mount Lemmon	Mount Lemmon Survey	ADE	1.5 km	MPC · JPL
823161	2016 AE_{268}	—	January 11, 2016	Haleakala	Pan-STARRS 1	EUN	990 m	MPC · JPL
823162	2016 AA_{271}	—	March 20, 2012	Haleakala	Pan-STARRS 1	·	1.0 km	MPC · JPL
823163	2016 AH_{272}	—	February 5, 2011	Haleakala	Pan-STARRS 1	·	2.6 km	MPC · JPL
823164	2016 AM_{273}	—	April 20, 2012	Mount Lemmon	Mount Lemmon Survey	JUN	860 m	MPC · JPL
823165	2016 AM_{279}	—	February 27, 2009	Kitt Peak	Spacewatch	·	760 m	MPC · JPL
823166	2016 AO_{280}	—	January 7, 2016	Haleakala	Pan-STARRS 1	·	990 m	MPC · JPL
823167	2016 AZ_{280}	—	February 28, 2009	Cerro Tololo	S. Bruzzone, P. Nowajewski	3:2	3.9 km	MPC · JPL
823168	2016 AV_{281}	—	January 9, 2016	Haleakala	Pan-STARRS 1	·	900 m	MPC · JPL
823169	2016 AK_{288}	—	October 19, 2011	Mount Lemmon	Mount Lemmon Survey	NYS	760 m	MPC · JPL
823170	2016 AV_{289}	—	January 8, 2016	Haleakala	Pan-STARRS 1	·	510 m	MPC · JPL
823171	2016 AL_{293}	—	January 3, 2016	Haleakala	Pan-STARRS 1	·	2.7 km	MPC · JPL
823172	2016 AS_{297}	—	January 13, 2016	Haleakala	Pan-STARRS 1	·	900 m	MPC · JPL
823173	2016 AA_{303}	—	January 4, 2016	Haleakala	Pan-STARRS 1	·	2.3 km	MPC · JPL
823174	2016 AO_{305}	—	January 12, 2016	Haleakala	Pan-STARRS 1	·	800 m	MPC · JPL
823175	2016 AV_{306}	—	January 12, 2016	Haleakala	Pan-STARRS 1	·	1.3 km	MPC · JPL
823176	2016 AC_{307}	—	January 8, 2016	Haleakala	Pan-STARRS 1	·	1.1 km	MPC · JPL
823177	2016 AL_{310}	—	January 7, 2016	Haleakala	Pan-STARRS 1	·	2.4 km	MPC · JPL
823178	2016 AG_{315}	—	January 11, 2016	Haleakala	Pan-STARRS 1	·	2.8 km	MPC · JPL
823179	2016 AV_{316}	—	January 4, 2016	Haleakala	Pan-STARRS 1	MAR	820 m	MPC · JPL
823180	2016 AN_{320}	—	January 2, 2016	Haleakala	Pan-STARRS 1	EUP	3.0 km	MPC · JPL
823181	2016 AX_{320}	—	January 9, 2016	Haleakala	Pan-STARRS 1	·	2.8 km	MPC · JPL
823182	2016 AF_{326}	—	March 23, 2012	Siding Spring	SSS	·	1.8 km	MPC · JPL
823183	2016 AR_{329}	—	January 4, 2016	Haleakala	Pan-STARRS 1	·	510 m	MPC · JPL
823184	2016 AS_{329}	—	January 14, 2016	Haleakala	Pan-STARRS 1	·	1 km	MPC · JPL
823185	2016 AT_{334}	—	January 4, 2016	Haleakala	Pan-STARRS 1	KON	1.4 km	MPC · JPL
823186	2016 AH_{335}	—	January 11, 2016	Haleakala	Pan-STARRS 1	·	1.1 km	MPC · JPL
823187	2016 AD_{338}	—	January 1, 2016	Haleakala	Pan-STARRS 1	·	1.9 km	MPC · JPL
823188	2016 AC_{341}	—	January 7, 2016	Haleakala	Pan-STARRS 1	·	1.7 km	MPC · JPL
823189	2016 AJ_{346}	—	January 9, 2016	Haleakala	Pan-STARRS 1	·	960 m	MPC · JPL
823190	2016 AT_{356}	—	November 6, 2008	Kitt Peak	Spacewatch	·	480 m	MPC · JPL
823191	2016 AS_{357}	—	January 3, 2016	Haleakala	Pan-STARRS 1	H	430 m	MPC · JPL
823192	2016 AL_{360}	—	January 14, 2016	Haleakala	Pan-STARRS 1	EUN	780 m	MPC · JPL
823193	2016 AC_{361}	—	January 9, 2016	Haleakala	Pan-STARRS 1	·	700 m	MPC · JPL
823194	2016 AX_{361}	—	January 3, 2016	Mount Lemmon	Mount Lemmon Survey	·	3.1 km	MPC · JPL
823195	2016 AU_{366}	—	January 4, 2016	Haleakala	Pan-STARRS 1	·	690 m	MPC · JPL
823196	2016 AK_{378}	—	January 12, 2016	Haleakala	Pan-STARRS 1	·	800 m	MPC · JPL
823197	2016 AN_{384}	—	January 4, 2016	Haleakala	Pan-STARRS 1	centaur	10 km	MPC · JPL
823198	2016 AU_{399}	—	October 4, 2014	Mount Lemmon	Mount Lemmon Survey	·	2.2 km	MPC · JPL
823199	2016 AL_{402}	—	January 9, 2016	Haleakala	Pan-STARRS 1	3:2	3.7 km	MPC · JPL
823200	2016 BG	—	February 4, 2011	Catalina	CSS	T_{j} (2.92)	2.2 km	MPC · JPL

== 823201–823300 ==
back to top

Designation			Discovery			Properties		Ref
Permanent	Provisional	Named after	Date	Site	Discoverer(s)	Category	Diam.	Ref
823201	2016 BA_{2}	—	April 7, 2002	Cerro Tololo	Deep Ecliptic Survey	·	700 m	MPC · JPL
823202	2016 BV_{5}	—	December 13, 2015	Haleakala	Pan-STARRS 1	H	330 m	MPC · JPL
823203	2016 BZ_{12}	—	January 7, 2016	ESA OGS	ESA OGS	·	2.3 km	MPC · JPL
823204	2016 BP_{17}	—	August 6, 2014	Kitt Peak	Spacewatch	·	1.8 km	MPC · JPL
823205	2016 BB_{21}	—	January 17, 2016	Haleakala	Pan-STARRS 1	·	490 m	MPC · JPL
823206	2016 BH_{27}	—	October 17, 2014	Catalina	CSS	TIR	2.4 km	MPC · JPL
823207	2016 BJ_{28}	—	January 28, 2016	Mount Lemmon	Mount Lemmon Survey	·	2.8 km	MPC · JPL
823208	2016 BW_{29}	—	March 6, 2013	Haleakala	Pan-STARRS 1	·	470 m	MPC · JPL
823209	2016 BL_{33}	—	January 27, 2003	Socorro	LINEAR	·	1.8 km	MPC · JPL
823210	2016 BY_{43}	—	December 31, 2008	Kitt Peak	Spacewatch	·	500 m	MPC · JPL
823211	2016 BD_{44}	—	January 29, 2012	Kitt Peak	Spacewatch	·	1.2 km	MPC · JPL
823212	2016 BF_{50}	—	September 11, 2007	Mount Lemmon	Mount Lemmon Survey	NYS	770 m	MPC · JPL
823213	2016 BW_{54}	—	August 6, 2014	Haleakala	Pan-STARRS 1	·	2.3 km	MPC · JPL
823214	2016 BV_{57}	—	January 7, 2016	Haleakala	Pan-STARRS 1	·	900 m	MPC · JPL
823215	2016 BG_{59}	—	September 13, 2014	Haleakala	Pan-STARRS 1	MAR	820 m	MPC · JPL
823216	2016 BA_{61}	—	March 13, 2012	Kitt Peak	Spacewatch	·	1.1 km	MPC · JPL
823217	2016 BZ_{62}	—	February 28, 2008	Mount Lemmon	Mount Lemmon Survey	·	800 m	MPC · JPL
823218	2016 BV_{66}	—	January 15, 2016	Haleakala	Pan-STARRS 1	·	2.6 km	MPC · JPL
823219	2016 BC_{67}	—	January 20, 2012	Haleakala	Pan-STARRS 1	·	1.2 km	MPC · JPL
823220	2016 BD_{71}	—	October 19, 2003	Anderson Mesa	LONEOS	TIR	2.5 km	MPC · JPL
823221	2016 BJ_{72}	—	January 31, 2016	Haleakala	Pan-STARRS 1	3:2 · SHU	4.4 km	MPC · JPL
823222	2016 BK_{74}	—	November 24, 2014	Haleakala	Pan-STARRS 1	EOS	1.5 km	MPC · JPL
823223	2016 BL_{75}	—	November 24, 2014	Mount Lemmon	Mount Lemmon Survey	·	2.0 km	MPC · JPL
823224	2016 BA_{76}	—	July 29, 2014	Haleakala	Pan-STARRS 1	·	830 m	MPC · JPL
823225	2016 BC_{80}	—	January 18, 2012	Mount Lemmon	Mount Lemmon Survey	EUN	810 m	MPC · JPL
823226	2016 BT_{80}	—	December 4, 2015	Mount Lemmon	Mount Lemmon Survey	H	390 m	MPC · JPL
823227	2016 BB_{82}	—	January 1, 2016	Haleakala	Pan-STARRS 1	H	430 m	MPC · JPL
823228	2016 BC_{82}	—	December 9, 2015	Haleakala	Pan-STARRS 1	H	440 m	MPC · JPL
823229	2016 BJ_{84}	—	January 16, 2016	Haleakala	Pan-STARRS 1	PHO	680 m	MPC · JPL
823230	2016 BT_{86}	—	January 29, 2016	Haleakala	Pan-STARRS 1	·	1.8 km	MPC · JPL
823231	2016 BH_{92}	—	July 14, 2013	Haleakala	Pan-STARRS 1	·	2.1 km	MPC · JPL
823232	2016 BU_{94}	—	March 16, 2012	Kitt Peak	Spacewatch	·	980 m	MPC · JPL
823233	2016 BW_{94}	—	December 29, 2014	Haleakala	Pan-STARRS 1	·	2.5 km	MPC · JPL
823234	2016 BH_{96}	—	January 17, 2016	Haleakala	Pan-STARRS 1	·	2.2 km	MPC · JPL
823235	2016 BJ_{99}	—	April 27, 2012	Haleakala	Pan-STARRS 1	·	1.3 km	MPC · JPL
823236	2016 BT_{101}	—	April 5, 2011	Mount Lemmon	Mount Lemmon Survey	·	1.6 km	MPC · JPL
823237	2016 BR_{103}	—	March 28, 2011	Mount Lemmon	Mount Lemmon Survey	·	2.4 km	MPC · JPL
823238	2016 BE_{105}	—	March 1, 2012	Mount Lemmon	Mount Lemmon Survey	·	910 m	MPC · JPL
823239	2016 BP_{106}	—	January 17, 2016	Haleakala	Pan-STARRS 1	EUN	920 m	MPC · JPL
823240	2016 BY_{108}	—	January 17, 2016	Haleakala	Pan-STARRS 1	·	2.5 km	MPC · JPL
823241	2016 BH_{109}	—	November 20, 2003	Sacramento Peak	SDSS	·	2.0 km	MPC · JPL
823242	2016 BD_{113}	—	January 17, 2016	Haleakala	Pan-STARRS 1	·	1.1 km	MPC · JPL
823243	2016 BT_{113}	—	January 18, 2016	Haleakala	Pan-STARRS 1	·	2.3 km	MPC · JPL
823244	2016 BD_{115}	—	January 31, 2016	Haleakala	Pan-STARRS 1	V	480 m	MPC · JPL
823245	2016 BU_{118}	—	January 18, 2016	Haleakala	Pan-STARRS 1	·	1.0 km	MPC · JPL
823246	2016 BN_{126}	—	January 31, 2016	Haleakala	Pan-STARRS 1	·	790 m	MPC · JPL
823247	2016 BM_{129}	—	January 18, 2016	Haleakala	Pan-STARRS 1	·	1.2 km	MPC · JPL
823248	2016 BC_{132}	—	January 18, 2016	Haleakala	Pan-STARRS 1	·	920 m	MPC · JPL
823249	2016 BA_{138}	—	January 18, 2016	Haleakala	Pan-STARRS 1	EUN	820 m	MPC · JPL
823250	2016 CR_{6}	—	January 30, 2011	Haleakala	Pan-STARRS 1	EOS	1.3 km	MPC · JPL
823251	2016 CM_{10}	—	April 19, 2009	Mount Lemmon	Mount Lemmon Survey	NYS	880 m	MPC · JPL
823252	2016 CP_{11}	—	February 25, 2006	Kitt Peak	Spacewatch	·	530 m	MPC · JPL
823253	2016 CF_{17}	—	February 16, 2012	Haleakala	Pan-STARRS 1	·	950 m	MPC · JPL
823254	2016 CW_{19}	—	October 1, 2014	Haleakala	Pan-STARRS 1	·	2.1 km	MPC · JPL
823255	2016 CL_{26}	—	February 24, 2012	Mount Lemmon	Mount Lemmon Survey	EUN	790 m	MPC · JPL
823256	2016 CB_{27}	—	April 18, 2007	Kitt Peak	Spacewatch	·	530 m	MPC · JPL
823257	2016 CG_{27}	—	February 9, 2005	Kitt Peak	Spacewatch	·	2.1 km	MPC · JPL
823258	2016 CM_{31}	—	February 7, 2011	Kitt Peak	Spacewatch	H	310 m	MPC · JPL
823259	2016 CQ_{32}	—	April 22, 2009	Mount Lemmon	Mount Lemmon Survey	·	1.0 km	MPC · JPL
823260	2016 CW_{35}	—	January 7, 2016	Haleakala	Pan-STARRS 1	·	1.9 km	MPC · JPL
823261	2016 CZ_{40}	—	January 31, 2016	Haleakala	Pan-STARRS 1	(5)	980 m	MPC · JPL
823262	2016 CN_{41}	—	November 28, 2011	Kitt Peak	Spacewatch	V	520 m	MPC · JPL
823263	2016 CS_{42}	—	March 10, 2008	Mount Lemmon	Mount Lemmon Survey	(5)	1.0 km	MPC · JPL
823264	2016 CU_{47}	—	September 19, 1998	Sacramento Peak	SDSS	·	460 m	MPC · JPL
823265	2016 CE_{48}	—	January 31, 2016	Haleakala	Pan-STARRS 1	V	460 m	MPC · JPL
823266	2016 CC_{51}	—	April 20, 2006	Mount Lemmon	Mount Lemmon Survey	·	540 m	MPC · JPL
823267	2016 CE_{60}	—	February 3, 2016	Haleakala	Pan-STARRS 1	·	760 m	MPC · JPL
823268	2016 CZ_{60}	—	February 3, 2016	Haleakala	Pan-STARRS 1	PHO	750 m	MPC · JPL
823269	2016 CH_{69}	—	November 17, 2014	Haleakala	Pan-STARRS 1	·	2.0 km	MPC · JPL
823270	2016 CT_{69}	—	May 15, 2008	Mount Lemmon	Mount Lemmon Survey	·	1.2 km	MPC · JPL
823271	2016 CE_{75}	—	November 22, 2014	Mount Lemmon	Mount Lemmon Survey	·	2.8 km	MPC · JPL
823272	2016 CR_{88}	—	March 14, 2011	Mount Lemmon	Mount Lemmon Survey	·	1.7 km	MPC · JPL
823273	2016 CW_{95}	—	February 22, 2012	Kitt Peak	Spacewatch	·	840 m	MPC · JPL
823274	2016 CJ_{101}	—	February 5, 2016	Haleakala	Pan-STARRS 1	·	1.5 km	MPC · JPL
823275	2016 CA_{103}	—	January 4, 2016	Haleakala	Pan-STARRS 1	·	1.2 km	MPC · JPL
823276	2016 CQ_{106}	—	June 24, 2014	Haleakala	Pan-STARRS 1	·	900 m	MPC · JPL
823277	2016 CN_{109}	—	January 4, 2016	Haleakala	Pan-STARRS 1	·	1.4 km	MPC · JPL
823278	2016 CR_{117}	—	December 11, 2014	Mount Lemmon	Mount Lemmon Survey	·	3.6 km	MPC · JPL
823279	2016 CA_{122}	—	October 28, 2014	Haleakala	Pan-STARRS 1	·	860 m	MPC · JPL
823280	2016 CR_{122}	—	January 18, 2012	Mount Lemmon	Mount Lemmon Survey	·	1.2 km	MPC · JPL
823281	2016 CE_{123}	—	April 15, 2008	Mount Lemmon	Mount Lemmon Survey	·	940 m	MPC · JPL
823282	2016 CN_{126}	—	February 5, 2016	Haleakala	Pan-STARRS 1	TIR	2.3 km	MPC · JPL
823283	2016 CD_{127}	—	July 16, 2013	Haleakala	Pan-STARRS 1	·	760 m	MPC · JPL
823284	2016 CT_{127}	—	January 16, 2016	Haleakala	Pan-STARRS 1	·	880 m	MPC · JPL
823285	2016 CR_{131}	—	February 28, 2009	Mount Lemmon	Mount Lemmon Survey	·	610 m	MPC · JPL
823286	2016 CV_{132}	—	February 5, 2016	Haleakala	Pan-STARRS 1	·	2.3 km	MPC · JPL
823287	2016 CZ_{136}	—	December 17, 2015	Mount Lemmon	Mount Lemmon Survey	H	440 m	MPC · JPL
823288	2016 CS_{140}	—	March 14, 2012	Mount Lemmon	Mount Lemmon Survey	·	860 m	MPC · JPL
823289	2016 CF_{141}	—	January 30, 2012	Kitt Peak	Spacewatch	·	750 m	MPC · JPL
823290	2016 CY_{142}	—	February 7, 2016	Mount Lemmon	Mount Lemmon Survey	·	2.2 km	MPC · JPL
823291	2016 CW_{143}	—	February 7, 2016	Mount Lemmon	Mount Lemmon Survey	·	640 m	MPC · JPL
823292	2016 CJ_{145}	—	January 9, 2016	Haleakala	Pan-STARRS 1	KON	1.5 km	MPC · JPL
823293	2016 CN_{145}	—	January 9, 2016	Haleakala	Pan-STARRS 1	·	1.1 km	MPC · JPL
823294	2016 CV_{145}	—	January 16, 2016	Haleakala	Pan-STARRS 1	T_{j} (2.98) · EUP	1.7 km	MPC · JPL
823295	2016 CD_{148}	—	September 4, 2008	Kitt Peak	Spacewatch	·	2.2 km	MPC · JPL
823296	2016 CY_{148}	—	October 30, 2014	Haleakala	Pan-STARRS 1	EOS	1.4 km	MPC · JPL
823297	2016 CC_{158}	—	February 9, 2016	Mount Lemmon	Mount Lemmon Survey	BRG	1.2 km	MPC · JPL
823298	2016 CV_{166}	—	December 25, 2005	Mount Lemmon	Mount Lemmon Survey	·	1.5 km	MPC · JPL
823299	2016 CM_{169}	—	January 8, 2016	Haleakala	Pan-STARRS 1	·	790 m	MPC · JPL
823300	2016 CP_{169}	—	January 30, 2016	Mount Lemmon	Mount Lemmon Survey	MAR	800 m	MPC · JPL

== 823301–823400 ==
back to top

Designation			Discovery			Properties		Ref
Permanent	Provisional	Named after	Date	Site	Discoverer(s)	Category	Diam.	Ref
823301	2016 CX_{173}	—	March 11, 2008	Catalina	CSS	(5)	1.1 km	MPC · JPL
823302	2016 CO_{179}	—	February 9, 2016	Haleakala	Pan-STARRS 1	KON	1.6 km	MPC · JPL
823303	2016 CN_{183}	—	November 21, 2009	Mount Lemmon	Mount Lemmon Survey	EOS	1.2 km	MPC · JPL
823304	2016 CZ_{190}	—	January 3, 2016	Haleakala	Pan-STARRS 1	·	530 m	MPC · JPL
823305	2016 CL_{192}	—	January 3, 2016	Haleakala	Pan-STARRS 1	MAR	790 m	MPC · JPL
823306	2016 CC_{198}	—	February 9, 2016	Haleakala	Pan-STARRS 1	·	520 m	MPC · JPL
823307	2016 CN_{203}	—	November 22, 2014	Haleakala	Pan-STARRS 1	·	2.6 km	MPC · JPL
823308	2016 CN_{206}	—	January 20, 2009	Kitt Peak	Spacewatch	·	540 m	MPC · JPL
823309	2016 CO_{211}	—	February 9, 2016	Haleakala	Pan-STARRS 1	·	900 m	MPC · JPL
823310	2016 CX_{212}	—	January 4, 2016	Haleakala	Pan-STARRS 1	·	1.6 km	MPC · JPL
823311	2016 CX_{224}	—	February 10, 2016	Haleakala	Pan-STARRS 1	·	870 m	MPC · JPL
823312	2016 CQ_{225}	—	March 14, 2012	Haleakala	Pan-STARRS 1	EUN	840 m	MPC · JPL
823313	2016 CZ_{228}	—	February 10, 2016	Catalina	CSS	·	1.7 km	MPC · JPL
823314	2016 CE_{234}	—	February 10, 2016	Haleakala	Pan-STARRS 1	·	1.8 km	MPC · JPL
823315	2016 CR_{235}	—	August 19, 2012	Siding Spring	SSS	·	1.8 km	MPC · JPL
823316	2016 CW_{239}	—	February 10, 2016	Haleakala	Pan-STARRS 1	·	2.3 km	MPC · JPL
823317	2016 CE_{240}	—	May 16, 2008	Kitt Peak	Spacewatch	·	1.2 km	MPC · JPL
823318	2016 CD_{245}	—	February 10, 2016	Haleakala	Pan-STARRS 1	(194)	1.1 km	MPC · JPL
823319	2016 CY_{246}	—	December 4, 2015	Haleakala	Pan-STARRS 1	·	1.4 km	MPC · JPL
823320	2016 CG_{264}	—	January 4, 2016	Haleakala	Pan-STARRS 1	·	790 m	MPC · JPL
823321	2016 CJ_{267}	—	February 10, 2016	Haleakala	Pan-STARRS 1	·	1.1 km	MPC · JPL
823322	2016 CQ_{269}	—	February 3, 2016	Haleakala	Pan-STARRS 1	·	2.0 km	MPC · JPL
823323	2016 CE_{271}	—	March 15, 2012	Mount Lemmon	Mount Lemmon Survey	·	850 m	MPC · JPL
823324	2016 CE_{272}	—	February 5, 2016	Haleakala	Pan-STARRS 1	·	1.6 km	MPC · JPL
823325	2016 CA_{273}	—	March 26, 2011	Kitt Peak	Spacewatch	·	1.9 km	MPC · JPL
823326	2016 CH_{273}	—	March 1, 2009	Kitt Peak	Spacewatch	·	710 m	MPC · JPL
823327	2016 CS_{276}	—	February 11, 2016	Haleakala	Pan-STARRS 1	·	1.1 km	MPC · JPL
823328	2016 CG_{277}	—	February 12, 2016	Haleakala	Pan-STARRS 1	·	1.7 km	MPC · JPL
823329	2016 CM_{278}	—	March 9, 2005	Mount Lemmon	Mount Lemmon Survey	THM	1.7 km	MPC · JPL
823330	2016 CN_{283}	—	February 9, 2016	Haleakala	Pan-STARRS 1	·	2.5 km	MPC · JPL
823331	2016 CC_{295}	—	March 30, 2008	Kitt Peak	Spacewatch	·	720 m	MPC · JPL
823332	2016 CE_{297}	—	October 23, 2014	Kitt Peak	Spacewatch	·	1.0 km	MPC · JPL
823333	2016 CR_{297}	—	February 3, 2016	Haleakala	Pan-STARRS 1	V	420 m	MPC · JPL
823334	2016 CL_{298}	—	January 20, 2012	Mount Lemmon	Mount Lemmon Survey	·	1.0 km	MPC · JPL
823335	2016 CA_{300}	—	December 20, 2009	Kitt Peak	Spacewatch	·	2.2 km	MPC · JPL
823336	2016 CS_{302}	—	March 29, 2012	Mount Lemmon	Mount Lemmon Survey	·	810 m	MPC · JPL
823337	2016 CC_{303}	—	November 13, 2010	Mount Lemmon	Mount Lemmon Survey	·	930 m	MPC · JPL
823338	2016 CP_{304}	—	February 5, 2016	Haleakala	Pan-STARRS 1	EUN	920 m	MPC · JPL
823339	2016 CB_{305}	—	February 5, 2016	Haleakala	Pan-STARRS 1	EUN	840 m	MPC · JPL
823340	2016 CM_{307}	—	February 6, 2016	Haleakala	Pan-STARRS 1	·	770 m	MPC · JPL
823341	2016 CY_{309}	—	March 24, 2012	Mount Lemmon	Mount Lemmon Survey	·	890 m	MPC · JPL
823342	2016 CH_{313}	—	September 20, 2014	Haleakala	Pan-STARRS 1	·	2.0 km	MPC · JPL
823343	2016 CR_{313}	—	February 10, 2016	Haleakala	Pan-STARRS 1	·	1.2 km	MPC · JPL
823344	2016 CJ_{322}	—	November 22, 2014	Haleakala	Pan-STARRS 1	·	1.4 km	MPC · JPL
823345	2016 CS_{322}	—	February 14, 2016	Haleakala	Pan-STARRS 1	JUN	850 m	MPC · JPL
823346	2016 CV_{323}	—	February 9, 2016	Haleakala	Pan-STARRS 1	·	910 m	MPC · JPL
823347	2016 CJ_{324}	—	February 5, 2016	Haleakala	Pan-STARRS 1	·	990 m	MPC · JPL
823348	2016 CW_{325}	—	February 11, 2016	Haleakala	Pan-STARRS 1	·	1.3 km	MPC · JPL
823349	2016 CX_{330}	—	September 6, 2008	Catalina	CSS	·	2.7 km	MPC · JPL
823350	2016 CD_{337}	—	February 9, 2016	Haleakala	Pan-STARRS 1	·	2.5 km	MPC · JPL
823351	2016 CL_{338}	—	February 3, 2016	Haleakala	Pan-STARRS 1	·	1.0 km	MPC · JPL
823352	2016 CV_{341}	—	February 11, 2016	Mount Lemmon	Mount Lemmon Survey	·	630 m	MPC · JPL
823353	2016 CE_{344}	—	February 10, 2016	Haleakala	Pan-STARRS 1	·	930 m	MPC · JPL
823354	2016 CF_{344}	—	February 10, 2016	Haleakala	Pan-STARRS 1	·	980 m	MPC · JPL
823355	2016 CM_{345}	—	February 3, 2016	Haleakala	Pan-STARRS 1	·	650 m	MPC · JPL
823356	2016 CH_{356}	—	February 5, 2016	Haleakala	Pan-STARRS 1	·	710 m	MPC · JPL
823357	2016 CO_{356}	—	February 8, 2016	Mount Lemmon	Mount Lemmon Survey	·	640 m	MPC · JPL
823358	2016 CB_{357}	—	February 1, 2016	Haleakala	Pan-STARRS 1	·	2.4 km	MPC · JPL
823359	2016 CT_{360}	—	February 5, 2016	Haleakala	Pan-STARRS 1	·	1.3 km	MPC · JPL
823360	2016 CN_{370}	—	February 2, 2016	Haleakala	Pan-STARRS 1	·	1.3 km	MPC · JPL
823361	2016 CX_{374}	—	February 10, 2016	Haleakala	Pan-STARRS 1	·	880 m	MPC · JPL
823362	2016 CF_{377}	—	February 5, 2016	Haleakala	Pan-STARRS 1	·	850 m	MPC · JPL
823363	2016 CC_{379}	—	February 5, 2016	Haleakala	Pan-STARRS 1	·	1.0 km	MPC · JPL
823364	2016 CK_{383}	—	February 3, 2016	Haleakala	Pan-STARRS 1	·	930 m	MPC · JPL
823365	2016 CM_{383}	—	May 16, 2012	Haleakala	Pan-STARRS 1	·	1.0 km	MPC · JPL
823366	2016 CA_{386}	—	February 12, 2016	Haleakala	Pan-STARRS 1	·	2.2 km	MPC · JPL
823367	2016 CP_{391}	—	February 11, 2016	Haleakala	Pan-STARRS 1	EUN	850 m	MPC · JPL
823368	2016 CF_{394}	—	February 10, 2016	Haleakala	Pan-STARRS 1	·	620 m	MPC · JPL
823369	2016 CU_{396}	—	February 5, 2016	Haleakala	Pan-STARRS 1	·	830 m	MPC · JPL
823370	2016 CK_{404}	—	February 11, 2016	Haleakala	Pan-STARRS 1	·	1.1 km	MPC · JPL
823371	2016 CP_{404}	—	February 12, 2016	Haleakala	Pan-STARRS 1	·	940 m	MPC · JPL
823372	2016 CZ_{404}	—	February 24, 2012	Mount Lemmon	Mount Lemmon Survey	·	890 m	MPC · JPL
823373	2016 CO_{405}	—	February 10, 2016	Haleakala	Pan-STARRS 1	EUN	870 m	MPC · JPL
823374	2016 CL_{408}	—	February 11, 2016	Haleakala	Pan-STARRS 1	3:2	3.4 km	MPC · JPL
823375	2016 CO_{411}	—	March 1, 2011	Mount Lemmon	Mount Lemmon Survey	KOR	1.1 km	MPC · JPL
823376	2016 CF_{434}	—	February 3, 2016	Haleakala	Pan-STARRS 1	·	1.0 km	MPC · JPL
823377	2016 DF_{9}	—	January 14, 2016	Haleakala	Pan-STARRS 1	·	540 m	MPC · JPL
823378	2016 DK_{11}	—	March 3, 2005	Catalina	CSS	·	860 m	MPC · JPL
823379	2016 DE_{14}	—	August 9, 2013	Haleakala	Pan-STARRS 1	·	2.3 km	MPC · JPL
823380	2016 DD_{20}	—	April 2, 2011	Kitt Peak	Spacewatch	·	2.2 km	MPC · JPL
823381	2016 DY_{20}	—	January 20, 2009	Kitt Peak	Spacewatch	·	570 m	MPC · JPL
823382	2016 DJ_{21}	—	February 9, 2016	Haleakala	Pan-STARRS 1	·	2.5 km	MPC · JPL
823383	2016 DD_{26}	—	February 27, 2016	Mount Lemmon	Mount Lemmon Survey	·	880 m	MPC · JPL
823384	2016 DC_{33}	—	September 24, 2008	Mount Lemmon	Mount Lemmon Survey	·	1.8 km	MPC · JPL
823385	2016 DC_{36}	—	February 27, 2016	Mount Lemmon	Mount Lemmon Survey	MAS	560 m	MPC · JPL
823386	2016 DE_{36}	—	February 28, 2016	Mount Lemmon	Mount Lemmon Survey	·	900 m	MPC · JPL
823387	2016 DD_{37}	—	February 25, 2016	Haleakala	Pan-STARRS 1	·	1.2 km	MPC · JPL
823388	2016 DW_{37}	—	February 17, 2016	Mount Lemmon	Mount Lemmon Survey	·	860 m	MPC · JPL
823389	2016 DD_{39}	—	February 29, 2016	Haleakala	Pan-STARRS 1	·	570 m	MPC · JPL
823390	2016 DH_{39}	—	February 28, 2016	Mount Lemmon	Mount Lemmon Survey	EUN	730 m	MPC · JPL
823391	2016 DM_{39}	—	March 20, 1999	Sacramento Peak	SDSS	·	460 m	MPC · JPL
823392	2016 DN_{42}	—	February 29, 2016	Cerro Paranal	Gaia Ground Based Optical Tracking	·	980 m	MPC · JPL
823393	2016 DN_{45}	—	February 27, 2016	Mount Lemmon	Mount Lemmon Survey	·	1.2 km	MPC · JPL
823394	2016 DQ_{47}	—	February 27, 2016	Mount Lemmon	Mount Lemmon Survey	·	1.1 km	MPC · JPL
823395	2016 EG	—	January 12, 2016	Haleakala	Pan-STARRS 1	·	200 m	MPC · JPL
823396	2016 EH	—	December 31, 2015	Haleakala	Pan-STARRS 1	·	1.8 km	MPC · JPL
823397	2016 EJ_{6}	—	January 14, 2016	Haleakala	Pan-STARRS 1	·	2.2 km	MPC · JPL
823398	2016 EV_{12}	—	February 11, 2016	Haleakala	Pan-STARRS 1	·	1.2 km	MPC · JPL
823399	2016 EX_{14}	—	March 3, 2016	Haleakala	Pan-STARRS 1	·	2.4 km	MPC · JPL
823400	2016 EP_{15}	—	February 4, 2016	Haleakala	Pan-STARRS 1	(1547)	1.1 km	MPC · JPL

== 823401–823500 ==
back to top

Designation			Discovery			Properties		Ref
Permanent	Provisional	Named after	Date	Site	Discoverer(s)	Category	Diam.	Ref
823401	2016 EC_{18}	—	January 8, 2016	Haleakala	Pan-STARRS 1	MAR	780 m	MPC · JPL
823402	2016 EL_{21}	—	February 9, 2013	Haleakala	Pan-STARRS 1	H	350 m	MPC · JPL
823403	2016 ER_{32}	—	April 29, 2011	Mount Lemmon	Mount Lemmon Survey	·	2.0 km	MPC · JPL
823404	2016 ED_{34}	—	January 8, 2016	Haleakala	Pan-STARRS 1	EUN	850 m	MPC · JPL
823405	2016 EN_{34}	—	January 8, 2016	Haleakala	Pan-STARRS 1	·	2.4 km	MPC · JPL
823406	2016 EK_{39}	—	October 24, 2015	Haleakala	Pan-STARRS 1	H	470 m	MPC · JPL
823407	2016 EX_{39}	—	February 10, 2016	Haleakala	Pan-STARRS 1	EUN	880 m	MPC · JPL
823408	2016 ET_{46}	—	April 1, 2012	Mount Lemmon	Mount Lemmon Survey	EUN	1.0 km	MPC · JPL
823409	2016 ED_{50}	—	December 11, 2014	Mount Lemmon	Mount Lemmon Survey	·	2.3 km	MPC · JPL
823410	2016 EO_{54}	—	March 4, 2016	Haleakala	Pan-STARRS 1	TIN	760 m	MPC · JPL
823411	2016 EX_{55}	—	March 14, 2011	Mount Lemmon	Mount Lemmon Survey	H	300 m	MPC · JPL
823412	2016 EM_{56}	—	September 28, 2008	Socorro	LINEAR	·	1.7 km	MPC · JPL
823413	2016 ER_{59}	—	February 28, 2016	Haleakala	Pan-STARRS 1	EUN	880 m	MPC · JPL
823414	2016 ES_{59}	—	March 4, 2016	Mount Lemmon	Mount Lemmon Survey	·	2.5 km	MPC · JPL
823415	2016 EL_{65}	—	March 16, 2009	Mount Lemmon	Mount Lemmon Survey	·	600 m	MPC · JPL
823416	2016 EK_{67}	—	May 12, 2013	Haleakala	Pan-STARRS 1	·	560 m	MPC · JPL
823417	2016 EN_{70}	—	April 28, 2009	Mount Lemmon	Mount Lemmon Survey	PHO	650 m	MPC · JPL
823418	2016 EQ_{82}	—	February 4, 2016	Haleakala	Pan-STARRS 1	·	2.0 km	MPC · JPL
823419	2016 ER_{84}	—	January 7, 2013	Kitt Peak	Spacewatch	H	500 m	MPC · JPL
823420	2016 EQ_{91}	—	September 23, 2008	Mount Lemmon	Mount Lemmon Survey	·	2.2 km	MPC · JPL
823421	2016 EP_{93}	—	March 13, 2011	Mount Lemmon	Mount Lemmon Survey	·	2.1 km	MPC · JPL
823422	2016 EO_{94}	—	February 4, 2016	Haleakala	Pan-STARRS 1	·	990 m	MPC · JPL
823423	2016 EQ_{100}	—	November 20, 2014	Mount Lemmon	Mount Lemmon Survey	·	1.6 km	MPC · JPL
823424	2016 ER_{105}	—	November 27, 2014	Haleakala	Pan-STARRS 1	·	1.8 km	MPC · JPL
823425	2016 EU_{105}	—	February 3, 2016	Haleakala	Pan-STARRS 1	·	1.1 km	MPC · JPL
823426	2016 ET_{106}	—	April 30, 2012	Kitt Peak	Spacewatch	·	1.2 km	MPC · JPL
823427	2016 EZ_{107}	—	March 27, 2012	Mount Lemmon	Mount Lemmon Survey	JUN	660 m	MPC · JPL
823428	2016 EE_{110}	—	February 3, 2016	Haleakala	Pan-STARRS 1	·	890 m	MPC · JPL
823429	2016 EJ_{120}	—	March 27, 2012	Kitt Peak	Spacewatch	·	1.1 km	MPC · JPL
823430	2016 ER_{120}	—	February 5, 2016	Haleakala	Pan-STARRS 1	·	980 m	MPC · JPL
823431	2016 EM_{121}	—	April 15, 2012	Haleakala	Pan-STARRS 1	·	860 m	MPC · JPL
823432	2016 EH_{122}	—	January 8, 2016	Haleakala	Pan-STARRS 1	DOR	1.6 km	MPC · JPL
823433	2016 EG_{126}	—	January 8, 2016	Haleakala	Pan-STARRS 1	·	1.3 km	MPC · JPL
823434	2016 EY_{126}	—	March 8, 2005	Mount Lemmon	Mount Lemmon Survey	MAS	530 m	MPC · JPL
823435	2016 EF_{130}	—	September 1, 2013	Mount Lemmon	Mount Lemmon Survey	KOR	1.2 km	MPC · JPL
823436	2016 EL_{130}	—	March 8, 2005	Mount Lemmon	Mount Lemmon Survey	MAS	530 m	MPC · JPL
823437	2016 EK_{132}	—	September 24, 2013	Mount Lemmon	Mount Lemmon Survey	·	2.4 km	MPC · JPL
823438	2016 EB_{138}	—	March 1, 2016	Haleakala	Pan-STARRS 1	MAS	630 m	MPC · JPL
823439	2016 EE_{144}	—	August 27, 2006	Kitt Peak	Spacewatch	·	860 m	MPC · JPL
823440	2016 EJ_{149}	—	March 10, 2016	Haleakala	Pan-STARRS 1	·	1.3 km	MPC · JPL
823441	2016 EM_{149}	—	March 10, 2016	Haleakala	Pan-STARRS 1	·	2.4 km	MPC · JPL
823442	2016 EW_{149}	—	February 5, 2011	Haleakala	Pan-STARRS 1	·	1.3 km	MPC · JPL
823443	2016 ER_{150}	—	February 14, 2010	Kitt Peak	Spacewatch	·	2.0 km	MPC · JPL
823444	2016 EZ_{150}	—	March 1, 2009	Kitt Peak	Spacewatch	·	520 m	MPC · JPL
823445	2016 EU_{157}	—	September 30, 2003	Kitt Peak	Spacewatch	·	350 m	MPC · JPL
823446	2016 EJ_{164}	—	February 10, 2016	Haleakala	Pan-STARRS 1	·	2.4 km	MPC · JPL
823447	2016 EK_{168}	—	March 11, 2016	Haleakala	Pan-STARRS 1	·	2.2 km	MPC · JPL
823448	2016 ET_{168}	—	March 11, 2016	Haleakala	Pan-STARRS 1	·	1.0 km	MPC · JPL
823449	2016 EQ_{171}	—	June 1, 2012	Mount Lemmon	Mount Lemmon Survey	·	880 m	MPC · JPL
823450	2016 ED_{172}	—	February 4, 2005	Mount Lemmon	Mount Lemmon Survey	·	1.7 km	MPC · JPL
823451	2016 EN_{173}	—	March 3, 2016	Haleakala	Pan-STARRS 1	·	1.2 km	MPC · JPL
823452	2016 EA_{178}	—	May 13, 2012	Mount Lemmon	Mount Lemmon Survey	·	1.1 km	MPC · JPL
823453	2016 ER_{178}	—	August 28, 2014	Haleakala	Pan-STARRS 1	H	380 m	MPC · JPL
823454	2016 EN_{187}	—	May 21, 2013	Mount Lemmon	Mount Lemmon Survey	·	1.0 km	MPC · JPL
823455	2016 EC_{189}	—	November 17, 2014	Haleakala	Pan-STARRS 1	·	960 m	MPC · JPL
823456	2016 EM_{194}	—	April 25, 2003	Kitt Peak	Spacewatch	·	1.3 km	MPC · JPL
823457	2016 EJ_{201}	—	February 29, 2016	Haleakala	Pan-STARRS 1	·	1.6 km	MPC · JPL
823458	2016 ER_{208}	—	March 4, 2016	Haleakala	Pan-STARRS 1	·	830 m	MPC · JPL
823459	2016 EN_{209}	—	March 5, 2016	Haleakala	Pan-STARRS 1	·	2.3 km	MPC · JPL
823460	2016 EO_{209}	—	March 5, 2016	Haleakala	Pan-STARRS 1	EUN	920 m	MPC · JPL
823461	2016 EF_{210}	—	February 23, 2007	Mount Lemmon	Mount Lemmon Survey	JUN	620 m	MPC · JPL
823462	2016 EG_{210}	—	March 6, 2016	Haleakala	Pan-STARRS 1	JUN	580 m	MPC · JPL
823463	2016 EO_{210}	—	March 7, 2016	Haleakala	Pan-STARRS 1	·	1.6 km	MPC · JPL
823464	2016 EY_{210}	—	March 10, 2016	Haleakala	Pan-STARRS 1	·	800 m	MPC · JPL
823465	2016 EG_{211}	—	March 10, 2016	Haleakala	Pan-STARRS 1	NEM	1.6 km	MPC · JPL
823466	2016 EC_{227}	—	March 12, 2016	Haleakala	Pan-STARRS 1	·	1.2 km	MPC · JPL
823467	2016 ET_{228}	—	October 23, 2003	Kitt Peak	Spacewatch	·	860 m	MPC · JPL
823468	2016 EO_{231}	—	October 24, 2013	Mount Lemmon	Mount Lemmon Survey	·	1.8 km	MPC · JPL
823469	2016 EM_{234}	—	December 29, 2014	Haleakala	Pan-STARRS 1	·	2.5 km	MPC · JPL
823470	2016 EB_{238}	—	April 29, 2012	Mount Lemmon	Mount Lemmon Survey	·	900 m	MPC · JPL
823471	2016 EP_{238}	—	July 1, 2013	Haleakala	Pan-STARRS 1	·	1.1 km	MPC · JPL
823472	2016 EW_{238}	—	April 18, 2012	Mount Lemmon	Mount Lemmon Survey	·	1.3 km	MPC · JPL
823473	2016 EM_{245}	—	May 12, 2012	Mount Lemmon	Mount Lemmon Survey	·	1.2 km	MPC · JPL
823474	2016 EP_{245}	—	December 29, 2014	Haleakala	Pan-STARRS 1	·	2.3 km	MPC · JPL
823475	2016 ES_{249}	—	March 14, 2016	Mount Lemmon	Mount Lemmon Survey	·	820 m	MPC · JPL
823476	2016 EF_{250}	—	March 4, 2016	Haleakala	Pan-STARRS 1	·	820 m	MPC · JPL
823477	2016 EO_{252}	—	March 12, 2016	Haleakala	Pan-STARRS 1	·	1.4 km	MPC · JPL
823478	2016 EE_{253}	—	March 4, 2016	Haleakala	Pan-STARRS 1	MAR	590 m	MPC · JPL
823479	2016 EN_{256}	—	March 12, 2016	Haleakala	Pan-STARRS 1	·	1.1 km	MPC · JPL
823480	2016 EB_{259}	—	March 3, 2016	Haleakala	Pan-STARRS 1	·	2.5 km	MPC · JPL
823481	2016 EF_{262}	—	March 4, 2016	Haleakala	Pan-STARRS 1	KON	1.6 km	MPC · JPL
823482	2016 EK_{263}	—	March 4, 2016	Haleakala	Pan-STARRS 1	·	1.0 km	MPC · JPL
823483	2016 ER_{266}	—	March 6, 2016	Haleakala	Pan-STARRS 1	·	1.3 km	MPC · JPL
823484	2016 ET_{267}	—	March 10, 2016	Haleakala	Pan-STARRS 1	(1547)	1.2 km	MPC · JPL
823485	2016 EC_{268}	—	March 12, 2016	Haleakala	Pan-STARRS 1	·	1.4 km	MPC · JPL
823486	2016 ED_{268}	—	March 14, 2016	Haleakala	Pan-STARRS 1	·	2.4 km	MPC · JPL
823487	2016 EG_{269}	—	March 3, 2016	Mount Lemmon	Mount Lemmon Survey	·	880 m	MPC · JPL
823488	2016 EW_{272}	—	March 6, 2016	Haleakala	Pan-STARRS 1	·	840 m	MPC · JPL
823489	2016 EZ_{273}	—	March 12, 2016	Haleakala	Pan-STARRS 1	·	530 m	MPC · JPL
823490	2016 EX_{275}	—	March 13, 2016	Haleakala	Pan-STARRS 1	·	1.3 km	MPC · JPL
823491	2016 EX_{276}	—	March 7, 2016	Haleakala	Pan-STARRS 1	·	1.3 km	MPC · JPL
823492	2016 EY_{276}	—	March 13, 2016	Haleakala	Pan-STARRS 1	·	960 m	MPC · JPL
823493	2016 EO_{277}	—	March 4, 2016	Haleakala	Pan-STARRS 1	·	1.5 km	MPC · JPL
823494	2016 EA_{279}	—	March 11, 2016	Mount Lemmon	Mount Lemmon Survey	·	1.7 km	MPC · JPL
823495	2016 EC_{283}	—	March 10, 2016	Haleakala	Pan-STARRS 1	·	1.7 km	MPC · JPL
823496	2016 ED_{285}	—	March 7, 2016	Haleakala	Pan-STARRS 1	·	670 m	MPC · JPL
823497	2016 EA_{292}	—	March 10, 2016	Haleakala	Pan-STARRS 1	·	1.6 km	MPC · JPL
823498	2016 EH_{292}	—	March 4, 2016	Haleakala	Pan-STARRS 1	·	710 m	MPC · JPL
823499	2016 EP_{297}	—	October 29, 2013	La Silla	La Silla	·	1.4 km	MPC · JPL
823500	2016 EV_{297}	—	March 10, 2016	Haleakala	Pan-STARRS 1	·	1.0 km	MPC · JPL

== 823501–823600 ==
back to top

Designation			Discovery			Properties		Ref
Permanent	Provisional	Named after	Date	Site	Discoverer(s)	Category	Diam.	Ref
823501	2016 EK_{299}	—	July 8, 2013	Haleakala	Pan-STARRS 1	·	1 km	MPC · JPL
823502	2016 EY_{303}	—	March 10, 2016	Haleakala	Pan-STARRS 1	·	780 m	MPC · JPL
823503	2016 EW_{305}	—	March 13, 2016	Haleakala	Pan-STARRS 1	·	2.0 km	MPC · JPL
823504	2016 EL_{307}	—	March 10, 2016	Haleakala	Pan-STARRS 1	·	900 m	MPC · JPL
823505	2016 EC_{309}	—	March 4, 2016	Haleakala	Pan-STARRS 1	·	1.3 km	MPC · JPL
823506	2016 ES_{309}	—	August 9, 2008	La Sagra	OAM	·	1.2 km	MPC · JPL
823507	2016 EO_{311}	—	March 5, 2016	Haleakala	Pan-STARRS 1	L4	6.7 km	MPC · JPL
823508	2016 EJ_{312}	—	March 13, 2016	Haleakala	Pan-STARRS 1	·	1.0 km	MPC · JPL
823509	2016 EV_{312}	—	March 12, 2016	Haleakala	Pan-STARRS 1	·	1.0 km	MPC · JPL
823510	2016 EX_{312}	—	March 13, 2016	Haleakala	Pan-STARRS 1	EUN	890 m	MPC · JPL
823511	2016 EJ_{314}	—	March 5, 2016	Haleakala	Pan-STARRS 1	EUN	800 m	MPC · JPL
823512	2016 EQ_{314}	—	March 10, 2016	Haleakala	Pan-STARRS 1	MAR	660 m	MPC · JPL
823513	2016 EZ_{316}	—	March 12, 2016	Haleakala	Pan-STARRS 1	·	2.4 km	MPC · JPL
823514	2016 EC_{317}	—	March 12, 2016	Haleakala	Pan-STARRS 1	·	1.2 km	MPC · JPL
823515	2016 ET_{336}	—	March 3, 2016	Haleakala	Pan-STARRS 1	·	1.5 km	MPC · JPL
823516	2016 EA_{342}	—	March 3, 2016	Mount Lemmon	Mount Lemmon Survey	·	910 m	MPC · JPL
823517	2016 EQ_{342}	—	January 18, 2015	Mount Lemmon	Mount Lemmon Survey	·	1.3 km	MPC · JPL
823518	2016 EA_{343}	—	March 2, 2016	Mount Lemmon	Mount Lemmon Survey	EUN	810 m	MPC · JPL
823519	2016 EA_{349}	—	March 7, 2016	Haleakala	Pan-STARRS 1	V	460 m	MPC · JPL
823520	2016 ER_{353}	—	March 6, 2016	Haleakala	Pan-STARRS 1	·	480 m	MPC · JPL
823521	2016 EN_{356}	—	February 27, 2012	Haleakala	Pan-STARRS 1	·	960 m	MPC · JPL
823522	2016 EL_{359}	—	March 10, 2016	Mount Lemmon	Mount Lemmon Survey	·	950 m	MPC · JPL
823523	2016 ED_{377}	—	May 12, 2012	Mount Lemmon	Mount Lemmon Survey	·	1.2 km	MPC · JPL
823524	2016 EK_{392}	—	November 27, 2014	Haleakala	Pan-STARRS 1	·	860 m	MPC · JPL
823525	2016 EJ_{401}	—	March 1, 2016	Mount Lemmon	Mount Lemmon Survey	3:2	4.1 km	MPC · JPL
823526	2016 FR_{1}	—	December 30, 2007	Kitt Peak	Spacewatch	·	820 m	MPC · JPL
823527	2016 FS_{1}	—	January 20, 2009	Kitt Peak	Spacewatch	·	470 m	MPC · JPL
823528	2016 FG_{11}	—	February 2, 2016	Haleakala	Pan-STARRS 1	·	1.2 km	MPC · JPL
823529	2016 FP_{19}	—	January 16, 2013	ESA OGS	ESA OGS	H	440 m	MPC · JPL
823530	2016 FQ_{22}	—	September 2, 2013	Mount Lemmon	Mount Lemmon Survey	·	1.7 km	MPC · JPL
823531	2016 FU_{23}	—	May 11, 2013	Mount Lemmon	Mount Lemmon Survey	·	480 m	MPC · JPL
823532	2016 FB_{24}	—	August 8, 2013	Kitt Peak	Spacewatch	NYS	860 m	MPC · JPL
823533	2016 FE_{24}	—	September 17, 2006	Kitt Peak	Spacewatch	·	2.2 km	MPC · JPL
823534	2016 FF_{26}	—	March 13, 2007	Mount Lemmon	Mount Lemmon Survey	·	1.1 km	MPC · JPL
823535	2016 FS_{32}	—	March 13, 2016	Haleakala	Pan-STARRS 1	EMA	2.2 km	MPC · JPL
823536	2016 FP_{33}	—	March 4, 2016	Haleakala	Pan-STARRS 1	·	2.5 km	MPC · JPL
823537	2016 FW_{35}	—	March 4, 2016	Haleakala	Pan-STARRS 1	·	1.2 km	MPC · JPL
823538	2016 FA_{38}	—	May 24, 2011	Haleakala	Pan-STARRS 1	·	1.7 km	MPC · JPL
823539	2016 FA_{39}	—	September 19, 2014	Haleakala	Pan-STARRS 1	H	360 m	MPC · JPL
823540	2016 FQ_{44}	—	February 26, 2008	Mount Lemmon	Mount Lemmon Survey	3:2 · SHU	4.1 km	MPC · JPL
823541	2016 FD_{46}	—	March 24, 2006	Mount Lemmon	Mount Lemmon Survey	·	590 m	MPC · JPL
823542	2016 FP_{51}	—	March 12, 2016	Haleakala	Pan-STARRS 1	·	830 m	MPC · JPL
823543	2016 FW_{53}	—	March 4, 2016	Haleakala	Pan-STARRS 1	PHO	740 m	MPC · JPL
823544	2016 FE_{55}	—	January 31, 2006	Kitt Peak	Spacewatch	·	460 m	MPC · JPL
823545	2016 FN_{55}	—	March 31, 2016	Haleakala	Pan-STARRS 1	·	1.0 km	MPC · JPL
823546	2016 FZ_{62}	—	March 31, 2016	Haleakala	Pan-STARRS 1	EUN	820 m	MPC · JPL
823547	2016 FW_{64}	—	January 15, 2015	Haleakala	Pan-STARRS 1	EOS	1.6 km	MPC · JPL
823548	2016 FN_{65}	—	January 28, 2007	Kitt Peak	Spacewatch	·	1.1 km	MPC · JPL
823549	2016 FX_{65}	—	March 17, 2016	Mount Lemmon	Mount Lemmon Survey	·	710 m	MPC · JPL
823550	2016 FU_{70}	—	March 17, 2016	Mount Lemmon	Mount Lemmon Survey	·	2.0 km	MPC · JPL
823551	2016 FR_{72}	—	March 17, 2016	Haleakala	Pan-STARRS 1	·	1.4 km	MPC · JPL
823552	2016 FS_{72}	—	March 16, 2016	Haleakala	Pan-STARRS 1	·	940 m	MPC · JPL
823553	2016 FQ_{74}	—	March 27, 2016	Mount Lemmon	Mount Lemmon Survey	·	1.1 km	MPC · JPL
823554	2016 FA_{75}	—	March 16, 2016	Haleakala	Pan-STARRS 1	·	530 m	MPC · JPL
823555	2016 FZ_{78}	—	March 16, 2016	Haleakala	Pan-STARRS 1	HNS	750 m	MPC · JPL
823556	2016 FU_{83}	—	March 30, 2016	Haleakala	Pan-STARRS 1	·	1.4 km	MPC · JPL
823557	2016 FQ_{89}	—	October 2, 2013	Kitt Peak	Spacewatch	·	1.4 km	MPC · JPL
823558	2016 FU_{92}	—	March 28, 2016	Cerro Tololo	DECam	·	1.1 km	MPC · JPL
823559	2016 FW_{108}	—	June 18, 2013	Haleakala	Pan-STARRS 1	·	600 m	MPC · JPL
823560	2016 FY_{130}	—	October 31, 2008	Kitt Peak	Spacewatch	·	1.5 km	MPC · JPL
823561	2016 GE_{4}	—	March 10, 2016	Haleakala	Pan-STARRS 1	·	690 m	MPC · JPL
823562	2016 GB_{5}	—	April 1, 2016	Mount Lemmon	Mount Lemmon Survey	·	750 m	MPC · JPL
823563	2016 GT_{6}	—	January 18, 2016	Haleakala	Pan-STARRS 1	·	980 m	MPC · JPL
823564	2016 GC_{7}	—	March 22, 2012	Mount Lemmon	Mount Lemmon Survey	·	1.1 km	MPC · JPL
823565	2016 GY_{10}	—	February 13, 2011	Mount Lemmon	Mount Lemmon Survey	·	1.2 km	MPC · JPL
823566	2016 GU_{15}	—	October 1, 2014	Haleakala	Pan-STARRS 1	·	410 m	MPC · JPL
823567	2016 GT_{21}	—	September 16, 2009	Mount Lemmon	Mount Lemmon Survey	·	1.0 km	MPC · JPL
823568	2016 GK_{25}	—	February 14, 2012	Haleakala	Pan-STARRS 1	CLA	1.0 km	MPC · JPL
823569	2016 GJ_{28}	—	March 10, 2016	Haleakala	Pan-STARRS 1	·	1.4 km	MPC · JPL
823570	2016 GN_{28}	—	March 10, 2016	Haleakala	Pan-STARRS 1	·	1.1 km	MPC · JPL
823571	2016 GF_{29}	—	January 25, 2006	Kitt Peak	Spacewatch	·	450 m	MPC · JPL
823572	2016 GO_{31}	—	August 15, 2013	Haleakala	Pan-STARRS 1	·	1.1 km	MPC · JPL
823573	2016 GU_{31}	—	December 16, 2014	Haleakala	Pan-STARRS 1	·	1.1 km	MPC · JPL
823574	2016 GC_{34}	—	November 26, 2014	Haleakala	Pan-STARRS 1	·	1.3 km	MPC · JPL
823575	2016 GQ_{36}	—	January 19, 2012	Haleakala	Pan-STARRS 1	NYS	840 m	MPC · JPL
823576	2016 GC_{43}	—	January 29, 2009	Kitt Peak	Spacewatch	·	450 m	MPC · JPL
823577	2016 GU_{48}	—	September 1, 2010	Mount Lemmon	Mount Lemmon Survey	·	700 m	MPC · JPL
823578	2016 GX_{48}	—	September 5, 2010	Mount Lemmon	Mount Lemmon Survey	·	860 m	MPC · JPL
823579	2016 GP_{59}	—	September 18, 2007	Mount Lemmon	Mount Lemmon Survey	·	480 m	MPC · JPL
823580	2016 GY_{61}	—	April 1, 2016	Haleakala	Pan-STARRS 1	·	750 m	MPC · JPL
823581	2016 GR_{68}	—	March 10, 2016	Haleakala	Pan-STARRS 1	·	500 m	MPC · JPL
823582	2016 GS_{80}	—	June 21, 2013	Mount Lemmon	Mount Lemmon Survey	·	830 m	MPC · JPL
823583	2016 GZ_{81}	—	March 10, 2016	Haleakala	Pan-STARRS 1	·	490 m	MPC · JPL
823584	2016 GK_{83}	—	April 1, 2016	Haleakala	Pan-STARRS 1	·	1.2 km	MPC · JPL
823585	2016 GU_{83}	—	November 19, 2009	Mount Lemmon	Mount Lemmon Survey	HOF	1.8 km	MPC · JPL
823586	2016 GE_{86}	—	October 2, 2013	Kitt Peak	Spacewatch	·	1.2 km	MPC · JPL
823587	2016 GH_{89}	—	November 26, 2014	Haleakala	Pan-STARRS 1	·	1.0 km	MPC · JPL
823588	2016 GU_{92}	—	April 1, 2016	Haleakala	Pan-STARRS 1	·	1.2 km	MPC · JPL
823589	2016 GL_{93}	—	May 14, 2012	Haleakala	Pan-STARRS 1	·	1.1 km	MPC · JPL
823590	2016 GR_{94}	—	April 1, 2016	Haleakala	Pan-STARRS 1	·	490 m	MPC · JPL
823591	2016 GV_{100}	—	May 27, 2009	Mount Lemmon	Mount Lemmon Survey	MAS	490 m	MPC · JPL
823592	2016 GA_{108}	—	April 1, 2016	Haleakala	Pan-STARRS 1	·	990 m	MPC · JPL
823593	2016 GX_{136}	—	February 15, 2012	Haleakala	Pan-STARRS 1	NYS	840 m	MPC · JPL
823594	2016 GU_{142}	—	January 8, 2016	Haleakala	Pan-STARRS 1	·	1.2 km	MPC · JPL
823595	2016 GK_{147}	—	June 21, 2012	ESA OGS	ESA OGS	·	1.2 km	MPC · JPL
823596	2016 GP_{151}	—	November 26, 2014	Haleakala	Pan-STARRS 1	·	2.3 km	MPC · JPL
823597	2016 GN_{157}	—	April 24, 2012	Kitt Peak	Spacewatch	EUN	760 m	MPC · JPL
823598	2016 GP_{161}	—	April 3, 2016	Haleakala	Pan-STARRS 1	·	540 m	MPC · JPL
823599	2016 GT_{164}	—	January 29, 2009	Kitt Peak	Spacewatch	·	470 m	MPC · JPL
823600	2016 GS_{165}	—	March 13, 2016	Haleakala	Pan-STARRS 1	KOR	1.1 km	MPC · JPL

== 823601–823700 ==
back to top

Designation			Discovery			Properties		Ref
Permanent	Provisional	Named after	Date	Site	Discoverer(s)	Category	Diam.	Ref
823601	2016 GB_{170}	—	April 3, 2016	Haleakala	Pan-STARRS 1	·	1.6 km	MPC · JPL
823602	2016 GF_{170}	—	February 16, 2012	Haleakala	Pan-STARRS 1	·	670 m	MPC · JPL
823603	2016 GW_{171}	—	September 9, 2008	Mount Lemmon	Mount Lemmon Survey	·	1.1 km	MPC · JPL
823604	2016 GL_{177}	—	March 31, 2016	Haleakala	Pan-STARRS 1	·	1.4 km	MPC · JPL
823605	2016 GH_{183}	—	February 11, 2016	Haleakala	Pan-STARRS 1	·	1.1 km	MPC · JPL
823606	2016 GO_{184}	—	August 9, 2013	Haleakala	Pan-STARRS 1	·	630 m	MPC · JPL
823607	2016 GW_{184}	—	August 26, 2008	Siding Spring	SSS	JUN	1.0 km	MPC · JPL
823608	2016 GA_{186}	—	April 3, 2016	Haleakala	Pan-STARRS 1	MAR	740 m	MPC · JPL
823609	2016 GK_{192}	—	April 3, 2016	Haleakala	Pan-STARRS 1	·	1.7 km	MPC · JPL
823610	2016 GT_{194}	—	March 10, 2016	Haleakala	Pan-STARRS 1	·	1.2 km	MPC · JPL
823611	2016 GN_{196}	—	April 4, 2016	Mount Lemmon	Mount Lemmon Survey	·	1.3 km	MPC · JPL
823612	2016 GM_{204}	—	October 29, 2014	Haleakala	Pan-STARRS 1	V	430 m	MPC · JPL
823613	2016 GB_{210}	—	September 15, 2014	Mount Lemmon	Mount Lemmon Survey	·	670 m	MPC · JPL
823614	2016 GG_{220}	—	March 2, 2007	Palomar	NEAT	·	4.0 km	MPC · JPL
823615	2016 GG_{222}	—	April 10, 2016	Haleakala	Pan-STARRS 1	H	390 m	MPC · JPL
823616	2016 GP_{224}	—	August 16, 2009	Kitt Peak	Spacewatch	·	930 m	MPC · JPL
823617	2016 GB_{228}	—	January 8, 2011	Mount Lemmon	Mount Lemmon Survey	·	1.1 km	MPC · JPL
823618	2016 GT_{229}	—	January 16, 2009	Mount Lemmon	Mount Lemmon Survey	·	540 m	MPC · JPL
823619	2016 GG_{231}	—	February 16, 2015	Haleakala	Pan-STARRS 1	T_{j} (2.89)	3.6 km	MPC · JPL
823620	2016 GP_{231}	—	June 8, 2012	Mount Lemmon	Mount Lemmon Survey	·	1.2 km	MPC · JPL
823621	2016 GS_{231}	—	April 14, 2016	Mount Lemmon	Mount Lemmon Survey	·	1.5 km	MPC · JPL
823622	2016 GS_{234}	—	April 14, 2016	Haleakala	Pan-STARRS 1	·	1.6 km	MPC · JPL
823623	2016 GR_{246}	—	October 17, 2010	Mount Lemmon	Mount Lemmon Survey	·	600 m	MPC · JPL
823624	2016 GN_{248}	—	January 10, 2008	Kitt Peak	Spacewatch	·	890 m	MPC · JPL
823625	2016 GB_{250}	—	May 22, 2012	Mount Lemmon	Mount Lemmon Survey	·	1.3 km	MPC · JPL
823626	2016 GM_{250}	—	March 10, 2007	Mount Lemmon	Mount Lemmon Survey	MIS	1.8 km	MPC · JPL
823627	2016 GW_{252}	—	March 19, 2015	Haleakala	Pan-STARRS 1	L4	8.0 km	MPC · JPL
823628	2016 GZ_{252}	—	April 1, 2016	Haleakala	Pan-STARRS 1	H	280 m	MPC · JPL
823629	2016 GQ_{253}	—	December 12, 2004	Kitt Peak	Spacewatch	H	430 m	MPC · JPL
823630	2016 GT_{256}	—	September 5, 2008	Kitt Peak	Spacewatch	·	1.3 km	MPC · JPL
823631	2016 GP_{261}	—	November 25, 2014	Haleakala	Pan-STARRS 1	·	1.3 km	MPC · JPL
823632	2016 GK_{264}	—	December 29, 2014	Haleakala	Pan-STARRS 1	·	1.2 km	MPC · JPL
823633	2016 GD_{265}	—	October 25, 2013	Kitt Peak	Spacewatch	ADE	1.4 km	MPC · JPL
823634	2016 GX_{267}	—	October 18, 2012	Haleakala	Pan-STARRS 1	·	2.2 km	MPC · JPL
823635	2016 GA_{271}	—	April 10, 2016	Haleakala	Pan-STARRS 1	·	1.1 km	MPC · JPL
823636	2016 GF_{272}	—	April 14, 2016	Haleakala	Pan-STARRS 1	·	1.5 km	MPC · JPL
823637	2016 GG_{272}	—	April 9, 2016	Haleakala	Pan-STARRS 1	EUN	900 m	MPC · JPL
823638	2016 GH_{272}	—	April 24, 2007	Mount Lemmon	Mount Lemmon Survey	·	1.4 km	MPC · JPL
823639	2016 GA_{273}	—	April 11, 2016	Haleakala	Pan-STARRS 1	·	840 m	MPC · JPL
823640	2016 GO_{273}	—	April 4, 2016	Haleakala	Pan-STARRS 1	·	1.0 km	MPC · JPL
823641	2016 GR_{275}	—	April 3, 2016	Haleakala	Pan-STARRS 1	·	1.5 km	MPC · JPL
823642	2016 GJ_{277}	—	April 1, 2016	Haleakala	Pan-STARRS 1	·	870 m	MPC · JPL
823643	2016 GT_{277}	—	April 2, 2016	Mount Lemmon	Mount Lemmon Survey	·	990 m	MPC · JPL
823644	2016 GZ_{278}	—	April 3, 2016	Haleakala	Pan-STARRS 1	·	1.1 km	MPC · JPL
823645	2016 GL_{280}	—	April 5, 2016	Haleakala	Pan-STARRS 1	·	1.0 km	MPC · JPL
823646	2016 GY_{281}	—	February 7, 2011	Mount Lemmon	Mount Lemmon Survey	·	1.1 km	MPC · JPL
823647	2016 GB_{285}	—	April 5, 2016	Haleakala	Pan-STARRS 1	·	990 m	MPC · JPL
823648	2016 GR_{285}	—	April 10, 2016	Haleakala	Pan-STARRS 1	·	1.1 km	MPC · JPL
823649	2016 GF_{288}	—	April 10, 2016	Haleakala	Pan-STARRS 1	GAL	970 m	MPC · JPL
823650	2016 GK_{288}	—	April 5, 2016	Haleakala	Pan-STARRS 1	·	1.1 km	MPC · JPL
823651	2016 GW_{288}	—	April 1, 2016	Haleakala	Pan-STARRS 1	·	400 m	MPC · JPL
823652	2016 GT_{289}	—	April 9, 2016	Haleakala	Pan-STARRS 1	·	990 m	MPC · JPL
823653	2016 GH_{290}	—	April 11, 2016	Haleakala	Pan-STARRS 1	·	610 m	MPC · JPL
823654	2016 GW_{297}	—	April 9, 2016	Haleakala	Pan-STARRS 1	EOS	1.5 km	MPC · JPL
823655	2016 GJ_{301}	—	April 13, 2016	Mount Lemmon	Mount Lemmon Survey	·	940 m	MPC · JPL
823656	2016 GY_{301}	—	April 10, 2016	Haleakala	Pan-STARRS 1	·	1.2 km	MPC · JPL
823657	2016 GO_{307}	—	April 10, 2016	Haleakala	Pan-STARRS 1	·	1.2 km	MPC · JPL
823658	2016 GU_{307}	—	April 4, 2016	Haleakala	Pan-STARRS 1	EUN	830 m	MPC · JPL
823659	2016 GM_{308}	—	April 9, 2016	Haleakala	Pan-STARRS 1	·	1.1 km	MPC · JPL
823660	2016 GB_{309}	—	April 5, 2016	Haleakala	Pan-STARRS 1	·	820 m	MPC · JPL
823661	2016 GF_{309}	—	April 5, 2016	Haleakala	Pan-STARRS 1	·	970 m	MPC · JPL
823662	2016 GO_{309}	—	November 1, 2002	Palomar	NEAT	·	1.1 km	MPC · JPL
823663	2016 GZ_{309}	—	April 3, 2016	Haleakala	Pan-STARRS 1	L4	6.4 km	MPC · JPL
823664	2016 GL_{311}	—	June 17, 2012	Mount Lemmon	Mount Lemmon Survey	·	1.1 km	MPC · JPL
823665	2016 GX_{312}	—	April 1, 2016	Haleakala	Pan-STARRS 1	·	1.2 km	MPC · JPL
823666	2016 GR_{317}	—	April 12, 2016	Haleakala	Pan-STARRS 1	·	1.2 km	MPC · JPL
823667	2016 GY_{319}	—	June 20, 2013	Haleakala	Pan-STARRS 1	·	990 m	MPC · JPL
823668	2016 GU_{320}	—	April 12, 2016	Haleakala	Pan-STARRS 1	·	1.3 km	MPC · JPL
823669	2016 GL_{321}	—	April 11, 2016	Haleakala	Pan-STARRS 1	·	1.3 km	MPC · JPL
823670	2016 GP_{321}	—	April 5, 2016	Haleakala	Pan-STARRS 1	·	1.2 km	MPC · JPL
823671	2016 GU_{323}	—	April 13, 2016	Mount Lemmon	Mount Lemmon Survey	·	1.1 km	MPC · JPL
823672	2016 GK_{325}	—	April 1, 2016	Haleakala	Pan-STARRS 1	·	1.0 km	MPC · JPL
823673	2016 GU_{325}	—	April 5, 2016	Haleakala	Pan-STARRS 1	·	1.4 km	MPC · JPL
823674	2016 GR_{340}	—	January 20, 2015	Mount Lemmon	Mount Lemmon Survey	·	2.4 km	MPC · JPL
823675	2016 GP_{345}	—	April 10, 2016	Haleakala	Pan-STARRS 1	·	1.4 km	MPC · JPL
823676	2016 GK_{346}	—	January 22, 2015	Haleakala	Pan-STARRS 1	·	1.6 km	MPC · JPL
823677	2016 GL_{357}	—	April 1, 2016	Haleakala	Pan-STARRS 1	·	1.3 km	MPC · JPL
823678	2016 GX_{359}	—	April 11, 2016	Haleakala	Pan-STARRS 1	·	1.3 km	MPC · JPL
823679	2016 GB_{360}	—	April 3, 2016	Haleakala	Pan-STARRS 1	·	850 m	MPC · JPL
823680	2016 GH_{360}	—	May 27, 2012	Mount Lemmon	Mount Lemmon Survey	·	1.5 km	MPC · JPL
823681	2016 HD	—	April 17, 2016	Haleakala	Pan-STARRS 1	H	380 m	MPC · JPL
823682	2016 HD_{1}	—	April 2, 2016	Kitt Peak	Spacewatch	·	1.5 km	MPC · JPL
823683	2016 HH_{1}	—	March 23, 2003	Kitt Peak	Spacewatch	·	890 m	MPC · JPL
823684	2016 HY_{1}	—	April 30, 2011	Mount Lemmon	Mount Lemmon Survey	·	1.4 km	MPC · JPL
823685	2016 HJ_{2}	—	April 14, 2012	Haleakala	Pan-STARRS 1	BAR	930 m	MPC · JPL
823686	2016 HR_{3}	—	March 5, 2016	Haleakala	Pan-STARRS 1	·	1.1 km	MPC · JPL
823687	2016 HA_{9}	—	May 24, 2012	Mount Lemmon	Mount Lemmon Survey	·	890 m	MPC · JPL
823688	2016 HC_{13}	—	April 5, 2016	Haleakala	Pan-STARRS 1	·	1.0 km	MPC · JPL
823689	2016 HB_{15}	—	October 7, 2008	Kitt Peak	Spacewatch	·	1.6 km	MPC · JPL
823690	2016 HF_{16}	—	March 6, 2016	Haleakala	Pan-STARRS 1	MAS	580 m	MPC · JPL
823691	2016 HQ_{29}	—	October 5, 2013	Mount Lemmon	Mount Lemmon Survey	·	1.2 km	MPC · JPL
823692	2016 HY_{34}	—	April 30, 2016	Haleakala	Pan-STARRS 1	·	940 m	MPC · JPL
823693	2016 HQ_{35}	—	April 29, 2016	Kitt Peak	Spacewatch	·	1.4 km	MPC · JPL
823694	2016 HA_{36}	—	April 30, 2016	Haleakala	Pan-STARRS 1	·	1.3 km	MPC · JPL
823695	2016 HJ_{40}	—	October 3, 2013	Haleakala	Pan-STARRS 1	·	1.4 km	MPC · JPL
823696	2016 HZ_{42}	—	April 27, 2016	Haleakala	Pan-STARRS 1	·	2.1 km	MPC · JPL
823697	2016 HC_{48}	—	April 30, 2016	Haleakala	Pan-STARRS 1	·	1.3 km	MPC · JPL
823698	2016 JR_{3}	—	April 12, 2016	Haleakala	Pan-STARRS 1	·	940 m	MPC · JPL
823699	2016 JS_{3}	—	August 25, 2004	Kitt Peak	Spacewatch	·	970 m	MPC · JPL
823700	2016 JT_{6}	—	March 10, 2016	Haleakala	Pan-STARRS 1	·	480 m	MPC · JPL

== 823701–823800 ==
back to top

Designation			Discovery			Properties		Ref
Permanent	Provisional	Named after	Date	Site	Discoverer(s)	Category	Diam.	Ref
823701	2016 JL_{10}	—	March 4, 2016	Haleakala	Pan-STARRS 1	·	940 m	MPC · JPL
823702	2016 JK_{11}	—	April 11, 2016	Haleakala	Pan-STARRS 1	·	1.2 km	MPC · JPL
823703	2016 JQ_{11}	—	March 5, 2016	Haleakala	Pan-STARRS 1	·	1.4 km	MPC · JPL
823704	2016 JM_{13}	—	April 3, 2016	Haleakala	Pan-STARRS 1	·	1.3 km	MPC · JPL
823705	2016 JR_{13}	—	March 5, 2016	Haleakala	Pan-STARRS 1	JUN	650 m	MPC · JPL
823706	2016 JY_{15}	—	September 3, 2013	Kitt Peak	Spacewatch	MAS	620 m	MPC · JPL
823707	2016 JK_{30}	—	March 15, 2007	Kitt Peak	Spacewatch	·	1.1 km	MPC · JPL
823708	2016 JF_{35}	—	March 5, 2016	Haleakala	Pan-STARRS 1	·	1.1 km	MPC · JPL
823709	2016 JC_{38}	—	February 16, 2015	Haleakala	Pan-STARRS 1	·	1.6 km	MPC · JPL
823710	2016 JW_{39}	—	October 30, 2007	Mount Lemmon	Mount Lemmon Survey	EOS	1.7 km	MPC · JPL
823711	2016 JB_{40}	—	May 6, 2016	Haleakala	Pan-STARRS 1	EUN	900 m	MPC · JPL
823712	2016 JU_{42}	—	August 30, 2011	Haleakala	Pan-STARRS 1	·	1.9 km	MPC · JPL
823713	2016 JE_{43}	—	May 5, 2016	Haleakala	Pan-STARRS 1	V	470 m	MPC · JPL
823714	2016 JG_{43}	—	May 13, 2016	Haleakala	Pan-STARRS 1	·	1.3 km	MPC · JPL
823715	2016 JN_{44}	—	May 3, 2016	Mount Lemmon	Mount Lemmon Survey	·	780 m	MPC · JPL
823716	2016 JG_{49}	—	May 6, 2016	Haleakala	Pan-STARRS 1	L4	6.6 km	MPC · JPL
823717	2016 JA_{52}	—	May 5, 2016	Haleakala	Pan-STARRS 1	EUN	850 m	MPC · JPL
823718	2016 JN_{52}	—	May 3, 2016	Mount Lemmon	Mount Lemmon Survey	EUN	870 m	MPC · JPL
823719	2016 JK_{55}	—	April 12, 2016	Haleakala	Pan-STARRS 1	·	1.5 km	MPC · JPL
823720	2016 JV_{73}	—	May 5, 2016	Haleakala	Pan-STARRS 1	·	1.3 km	MPC · JPL
823721	2016 JS_{93}	—	January 17, 2015	Mount Lemmon	Mount Lemmon Survey	·	980 m	MPC · JPL
823722	2016 KM	—	September 5, 2008	Socorro	LINEAR	·	1.2 km	MPC · JPL
823723	2016 KN	—	October 1, 2014	Haleakala	Pan-STARRS 1	H	400 m	MPC · JPL
823724	2016 KN_{1}	—	June 21, 2007	Mount Lemmon	Mount Lemmon Survey	·	1.1 km	MPC · JPL
823725	2016 KT_{2}	—	May 29, 2016	Space Surveillance	Space Surveillance Telescope	·	1.3 km	MPC · JPL
823726	2016 KE_{3}	—	May 4, 2016	Haleakala	Pan-STARRS 1	·	1.2 km	MPC · JPL
823727	2016 KC_{10}	—	May 30, 2016	Haleakala	Pan-STARRS 1	·	940 m	MPC · JPL
823728	2016 KM_{10}	—	May 30, 2016	Haleakala	Pan-STARRS 1	ADE	1.4 km	MPC · JPL
823729	2016 KB_{13}	—	May 17, 2016	Haleakala	Pan-STARRS 1	·	2.2 km	MPC · JPL
823730	2016 LL	—	June 2, 2016	Mount Lemmon	Mount Lemmon Survey	·	1.2 km	MPC · JPL
823731	2016 LM_{6}	—	May 13, 2016	Haleakala	Pan-STARRS 1	·	1.3 km	MPC · JPL
823732	2016 LO_{10}	—	August 11, 2012	Haleakala	Pan-STARRS 1	·	1.5 km	MPC · JPL
823733	2016 LF_{15}	—	September 1, 2013	Haleakala	Pan-STARRS 1	·	860 m	MPC · JPL
823734	2016 LX_{20}	—	May 2, 2016	Haleakala	Pan-STARRS 1	·	1.3 km	MPC · JPL
823735	2016 LB_{21}	—	May 30, 2016	Haleakala	Pan-STARRS 1	EUN	830 m	MPC · JPL
823736	2016 LA_{25}	—	September 23, 2008	Mount Lemmon	Mount Lemmon Survey	·	1.2 km	MPC · JPL
823737	2016 LM_{26}	—	May 30, 2016	Haleakala	Pan-STARRS 1	·	830 m	MPC · JPL
823738	2016 LR_{26}	—	May 2, 2016	Haleakala	Pan-STARRS 1	·	470 m	MPC · JPL
823739	2016 LN_{27}	—	September 17, 2012	Mount Lemmon	Mount Lemmon Survey	·	1.4 km	MPC · JPL
823740	2016 LB_{33}	—	January 20, 2015	Haleakala	Pan-STARRS 1	·	1.4 km	MPC · JPL
823741	2016 LO_{36}	—	January 3, 2009	Mount Lemmon	Mount Lemmon Survey	·	440 m	MPC · JPL
823742	2016 LK_{37}	—	June 10, 2007	Kitt Peak	Spacewatch	·	1.1 km	MPC · JPL
823743	2016 LN_{42}	—	April 29, 2011	Mount Lemmon	Mount Lemmon Survey	·	1.4 km	MPC · JPL
823744	2016 LQ_{42}	—	June 5, 2016	Haleakala	Pan-STARRS 1	·	1.2 km	MPC · JPL
823745	2016 LD_{44}	—	September 16, 2012	Nogales	M. Schwartz, P. R. Holvorcem	JUN	810 m	MPC · JPL
823746	2016 LY_{44}	—	January 20, 2015	Haleakala	Pan-STARRS 1	·	1.2 km	MPC · JPL
823747	2016 LK_{46}	—	March 4, 2016	Haleakala	Pan-STARRS 1	EUN	790 m	MPC · JPL
823748	2016 LO_{55}	—	September 26, 2003	Sacramento Peak	SDSS	·	1.4 km	MPC · JPL
823749	2016 LV_{58}	—	September 28, 2006	Catalina	CSS	·	1.4 km	MPC · JPL
823750	2016 LD_{61}	—	October 22, 2008	Kitt Peak	Spacewatch	EUN	1 km	MPC · JPL
823751	2016 LL_{61}	—	September 29, 2011	Mount Lemmon	Mount Lemmon Survey	·	2.2 km	MPC · JPL
823752	2016 LZ_{61}	—	November 4, 2012	Mount Lemmon	Mount Lemmon Survey	·	1.1 km	MPC · JPL
823753	2016 LA_{64}	—	April 6, 2011	Mount Lemmon	Mount Lemmon Survey	·	1.3 km	MPC · JPL
823754	2016 LX_{65}	—	June 2, 2016	Mount Lemmon	Mount Lemmon Survey	·	850 m	MPC · JPL
823755	2016 LR_{66}	—	May 22, 2012	Mount Lemmon	Mount Lemmon Survey	JUN	780 m	MPC · JPL
823756	2016 LZ_{68}	—	June 4, 2016	Mount Lemmon	Mount Lemmon Survey	·	2.1 km	MPC · JPL
823757	2016 LE_{70}	—	June 9, 2016	Haleakala	Pan-STARRS 1	·	1.1 km	MPC · JPL
823758	2016 LN_{73}	—	June 3, 2016	Mount Lemmon	Mount Lemmon Survey	TIN	580 m	MPC · JPL
823759	2016 LR_{73}	—	June 7, 2016	Haleakala	Pan-STARRS 1	·	2.5 km	MPC · JPL
823760	2016 LZ_{73}	—	June 7, 2016	Haleakala	Pan-STARRS 1	·	1.4 km	MPC · JPL
823761	2016 LL_{76}	—	June 8, 2016	Haleakala	Pan-STARRS 1	·	800 m	MPC · JPL
823762	2016 LL_{80}	—	June 8, 2016	Mount Lemmon	Mount Lemmon Survey	·	2.3 km	MPC · JPL
823763	2016 LP_{80}	—	June 13, 2016	Haleakala	Pan-STARRS 1	·	630 m	MPC · JPL
823764	2016 LW_{80}	—	April 14, 2016	Mount Lemmon	Mount Lemmon Survey	·	1.4 km	MPC · JPL
823765	2016 LM_{82}	—	June 4, 2016	Catalina	CSS	PHO	660 m	MPC · JPL
823766	2016 LL_{88}	—	June 4, 2016	Mount Lemmon	Mount Lemmon Survey	EOS	1.4 km	MPC · JPL
823767	2016 LO_{88}	—	June 4, 2016	Haleakala	Pan-STARRS 1	·	2.7 km	MPC · JPL
823768	2016 LD_{94}	—	June 7, 2016	Haleakala	Pan-STARRS 1	EUN	820 m	MPC · JPL
823769	2016 LT_{94}	—	February 23, 2015	Haleakala	Pan-STARRS 1	·	1.4 km	MPC · JPL
823770	2016 LB_{95}	—	June 4, 2016	Mount Lemmon	Mount Lemmon Survey	·	1.3 km	MPC · JPL
823771	2016 LR_{98}	—	June 5, 2016	Haleakala	Pan-STARRS 1	·	1.9 km	MPC · JPL
823772	2016 LE_{100}	—	June 5, 2016	Haleakala	Pan-STARRS 1	·	1.4 km	MPC · JPL
823773	2016 LK_{109}	—	June 11, 2016	Mauna Kea	COIAS	·	1.5 km	MPC · JPL
823774	2016 MU_{3}	—	April 13, 2015	Mount Lemmon	Mount Lemmon Survey	·	2.2 km	MPC · JPL
823775	2016 MX_{4}	—	June 29, 2016	Haleakala	Pan-STARRS 1	·	2.3 km	MPC · JPL
823776	2016 NS_{4}	—	October 1, 2000	Anderson Mesa	LONEOS	·	590 m	MPC · JPL
823777	2016 NU_{5}	—	January 24, 2015	Haleakala	Pan-STARRS 1	·	1.3 km	MPC · JPL
823778	2016 NA_{8}	—	May 18, 2007	Bergisch Gladbach	W. Bickel	·	1.3 km	MPC · JPL
823779	2016 NW_{8}	—	September 6, 2008	Catalina	CSS	·	940 m	MPC · JPL
823780	2016 NB_{12}	—	June 8, 2016	Haleakala	Pan-STARRS 1	·	1.2 km	MPC · JPL
823781	2016 NL_{16}	—	November 18, 2014	Mount Lemmon	Mount Lemmon Survey	·	460 m	MPC · JPL
823782	2016 NW_{17}	—	August 25, 2003	Palomar	NEAT	JUN	880 m	MPC · JPL
823783	2016 NR_{23}	—	July 5, 2016	Catalina	CSS	·	2.3 km	MPC · JPL
823784	2016 NH_{24}	—	June 8, 2016	Mount Lemmon	Mount Lemmon Survey	H	400 m	MPC · JPL
823785	2016 NL_{24}	—	August 10, 2007	Kitt Peak	Spacewatch	·	1.8 km	MPC · JPL
823786	2016 NY_{24}	—	March 12, 2010	WISE	WISE	·	2.1 km	MPC · JPL
823787	2016 NA_{29}	—	April 23, 2015	Haleakala	Pan-STARRS 1	EUN	960 m	MPC · JPL
823788	2016 NF_{30}	—	September 3, 2007	Mount Lemmon	Mount Lemmon Survey	·	1.7 km	MPC · JPL
823789	2016 NA_{34}	—	September 27, 2006	Kitt Peak	Spacewatch	·	530 m	MPC · JPL
823790	2016 NH_{34}	—	July 12, 2016	Mount Lemmon	Mount Lemmon Survey	·	480 m	MPC · JPL
823791	2016 NJ_{35}	—	October 3, 2006	Mount Lemmon	Mount Lemmon Survey	·	510 m	MPC · JPL
823792	2016 NV_{41}	—	December 29, 1999	Mauna Kea	Veillet, C.	·	1.5 km	MPC · JPL
823793	2016 NS_{42}	—	June 7, 2016	Haleakala	Pan-STARRS 1	·	630 m	MPC · JPL
823794	2016 ND_{46}	—	October 11, 2012	Haleakala	Pan-STARRS 1	AGN	890 m	MPC · JPL
823795	2016 NO_{46}	—	January 16, 2015	Haleakala	Pan-STARRS 1	(194)	880 m	MPC · JPL
823796	2016 NT_{49}	—	August 29, 2005	Kitt Peak	Spacewatch	·	970 m	MPC · JPL
823797	2016 NC_{51}	—	April 28, 2012	Mount Lemmon	Mount Lemmon Survey	·	560 m	MPC · JPL
823798	2016 NQ_{57}	—	June 27, 2011	Kitt Peak	Spacewatch	H	380 m	MPC · JPL
823799	2016 NG_{59}	—	May 6, 2011	Kitt Peak	Spacewatch	·	1.4 km	MPC · JPL
823800	2016 NO_{60}	—	October 22, 2012	Mount Lemmon	Mount Lemmon Survey	·	1.5 km	MPC · JPL

== 823801–823900 ==
back to top

Designation			Discovery			Properties		Ref
Permanent	Provisional	Named after	Date	Site	Discoverer(s)	Category	Diam.	Ref
823801	2016 NO_{61}	—	July 7, 2016	Haleakala	Pan-STARRS 1	·	1.2 km	MPC · JPL
823802	2016 NU_{61}	—	July 9, 2016	Mount Lemmon	Mount Lemmon Survey	·	1.4 km	MPC · JPL
823803	2016 NT_{63}	—	August 28, 2002	Palomar	NEAT	·	1.9 km	MPC · JPL
823804	2016 NB_{78}	—	July 5, 2016	Haleakala	Pan-STARRS 1	EOS	1.3 km	MPC · JPL
823805	2016 NL_{79}	—	October 16, 2012	Mount Lemmon	Mount Lemmon Survey	EUN	820 m	MPC · JPL
823806	2016 NP_{79}	—	October 21, 2003	Kitt Peak	Spacewatch	·	1.3 km	MPC · JPL
823807	2016 NR_{80}	—	July 7, 2016	Haleakala	Pan-STARRS 1	·	1.5 km	MPC · JPL
823808	2016 NA_{81}	—	July 7, 2016	Haleakala	Pan-STARRS 1	·	980 m	MPC · JPL
823809	2016 NP_{81}	—	September 4, 2011	Haleakala	Pan-STARRS 1	·	2.3 km	MPC · JPL
823810	2016 NB_{83}	—	July 11, 2016	Haleakala	Pan-STARRS 1	·	1.7 km	MPC · JPL
823811	2016 NT_{83}	—	July 11, 2016	Haleakala	Pan-STARRS 1	·	600 m	MPC · JPL
823812	2016 NE_{85}	—	January 27, 2015	Haleakala	Pan-STARRS 1	·	800 m	MPC · JPL
823813	2016 NR_{85}	—	July 11, 2016	Haleakala	Pan-STARRS 1	·	1.1 km	MPC · JPL
823814	2016 NX_{85}	—	July 11, 2016	Haleakala	Pan-STARRS 1	·	1.6 km	MPC · JPL
823815	2016 NN_{86}	—	July 12, 2016	Mount Lemmon	Mount Lemmon Survey	·	780 m	MPC · JPL
823816	2016 NH_{88}	—	July 14, 2016	Haleakala	Pan-STARRS 1	·	1.4 km	MPC · JPL
823817	2016 NK_{90}	—	January 13, 2005	Catalina	CSS	(1547)	1.6 km	MPC · JPL
823818	2016 NH_{91}	—	July 3, 2016	Mount Lemmon	Mount Lemmon Survey	·	830 m	MPC · JPL
823819	2016 NC_{92}	—	July 5, 2016	Haleakala	Pan-STARRS 1	·	870 m	MPC · JPL
823820	2016 NZ_{92}	—	June 7, 2016	Mount Lemmon	Mount Lemmon Survey	·	2.6 km	MPC · JPL
823821	2016 NO_{93}	—	July 8, 2016	Haleakala	Pan-STARRS 1	·	1.9 km	MPC · JPL
823822	2016 NR_{94}	—	July 6, 2016	Haleakala	Pan-STARRS 1	·	1.3 km	MPC · JPL
823823	2016 NX_{94}	—	November 1, 2007	Catalina	CSS	·	1.3 km	MPC · JPL
823824	2016 NJ_{95}	—	September 7, 2007	La Cañada	Lacruz, J.	·	1.2 km	MPC · JPL
823825	2016 NS_{95}	—	July 7, 2016	Mount Lemmon	Mount Lemmon Survey	·	1.2 km	MPC · JPL
823826	2016 NW_{101}	—	January 20, 2015	Haleakala	Pan-STARRS 1	EUN	790 m	MPC · JPL
823827	2016 NB_{104}	—	July 11, 2016	Haleakala	Pan-STARRS 1	·	1.9 km	MPC · JPL
823828	2016 NQ_{106}	—	July 4, 2016	Haleakala	Pan-STARRS 1	·	1.4 km	MPC · JPL
823829	2016 NV_{108}	—	July 12, 2016	Kitt Peak	Spacewatch	V	460 m	MPC · JPL
823830	2016 NO_{110}	—	July 4, 2016	Haleakala	Pan-STARRS 1	·	1.6 km	MPC · JPL
823831	2016 NS_{110}	—	July 5, 2016	Mount Lemmon	Mount Lemmon Survey	·	1.3 km	MPC · JPL
823832	2016 NB_{111}	—	July 5, 2016	Mount Lemmon	Mount Lemmon Survey	·	1.3 km	MPC · JPL
823833	2016 NE_{112}	—	July 11, 2016	Haleakala	Pan-STARRS 1	·	1.2 km	MPC · JPL
823834	2016 NG_{112}	—	July 13, 2016	Mount Lemmon	Mount Lemmon Survey	·	1.3 km	MPC · JPL
823835	2016 NQ_{112}	—	July 13, 2016	Haleakala	Pan-STARRS 1	H	380 m	MPC · JPL
823836	2016 NH_{113}	—	July 5, 2016	Haleakala	Pan-STARRS 1	GEF	790 m	MPC · JPL
823837	2016 NW_{115}	—	July 13, 2016	Haleakala	Pan-STARRS 1	·	1.5 km	MPC · JPL
823838	2016 NX_{115}	—	July 4, 2016	Haleakala	Pan-STARRS 1	AEO	770 m	MPC · JPL
823839	2016 NY_{118}	—	July 9, 2016	Haleakala	Pan-STARRS 1	·	1.1 km	MPC · JPL
823840	2016 NW_{122}	—	July 12, 2016	Mount Lemmon	Mount Lemmon Survey	·	770 m	MPC · JPL
823841	2016 NE_{124}	—	July 14, 2016	Haleakala	Pan-STARRS 1	·	710 m	MPC · JPL
823842	2016 NW_{127}	—	July 6, 2016	Haleakala	Pan-STARRS 1	·	570 m	MPC · JPL
823843	2016 NE_{129}	—	July 12, 2016	Mount Lemmon	Mount Lemmon Survey	·	850 m	MPC · JPL
823844	2016 NU_{129}	—	July 11, 2016	Haleakala	Pan-STARRS 1	·	750 m	MPC · JPL
823845	2016 NA_{130}	—	November 24, 2009	Kitt Peak	Spacewatch	·	720 m	MPC · JPL
823846	2016 NM_{130}	—	July 3, 2016	Mount Lemmon	Mount Lemmon Survey	·	2.4 km	MPC · JPL
823847	2016 NN_{130}	—	July 5, 2016	Mount Lemmon	Mount Lemmon Survey	·	730 m	MPC · JPL
823848	2016 NW_{132}	—	July 4, 2016	Haleakala	Pan-STARRS 1	V	420 m	MPC · JPL
823849	2016 NR_{135}	—	July 11, 2016	Haleakala	Pan-STARRS 1	EOS	1.5 km	MPC · JPL
823850	2016 NH_{137}	—	July 11, 2016	Haleakala	Pan-STARRS 1	·	560 m	MPC · JPL
823851	2016 NE_{142}	—	July 7, 2016	Haleakala	Pan-STARRS 1	·	2.2 km	MPC · JPL
823852	2016 NX_{142}	—	July 14, 2016	Mount Lemmon	Mount Lemmon Survey	TIR	1.9 km	MPC · JPL
823853	2016 NM_{144}	—	July 11, 2016	Haleakala	Pan-STARRS 1	·	440 m	MPC · JPL
823854	2016 NK_{145}	—	July 14, 2016	Haleakala	Pan-STARRS 1	·	1.3 km	MPC · JPL
823855	2016 NB_{146}	—	July 14, 2016	Mount Lemmon	Mount Lemmon Survey	·	1.5 km	MPC · JPL
823856	2016 NV_{149}	—	July 4, 2016	Haleakala	Pan-STARRS 1	615	990 m	MPC · JPL
823857	2016 NQ_{154}	—	July 7, 2016	Haleakala	Pan-STARRS 1	·	1.4 km	MPC · JPL
823858	2016 NT_{155}	—	July 11, 2016	Haleakala	Pan-STARRS 1	·	1.3 km	MPC · JPL
823859	2016 NJ_{156}	—	July 5, 2016	Haleakala	Pan-STARRS 1	ADE	1.3 km	MPC · JPL
823860	2016 NZ_{205}	—	July 5, 2016	Haleakala	Pan-STARRS 1	·	1.6 km	MPC · JPL
823861	2016 OQ	—	December 19, 2009	Mount Lemmon	Mount Lemmon Survey	H	440 m	MPC · JPL
823862	2016 OG_{4}	—	January 17, 2015	Haleakala	Pan-STARRS 1	·	630 m	MPC · JPL
823863	2016 OD_{5}	—	July 31, 2016	Haleakala	Pan-STARRS 1	LIX	2.7 km	MPC · JPL
823864	2016 OC_{7}	—	February 13, 2009	Calar Alto	F. Hormuth, Datson, J. C.	·	1.8 km	MPC · JPL
823865	2016 OF_{10}	—	July 17, 2016	Haleakala	Pan-STARRS 1	·	740 m	MPC · JPL
823866	2016 OU_{12}	—	July 17, 2016	Haleakala	Pan-STARRS 1	·	1.1 km	MPC · JPL
823867	2016 OV_{15}	—	July 31, 2016	Haleakala	Pan-STARRS 1	·	550 m	MPC · JPL
823868	2016 PX_{1}	—	January 17, 2015	Haleakala	Pan-STARRS 1	H	440 m	MPC · JPL
823869	2016 PH_{2}	—	August 24, 2007	Kitt Peak	Spacewatch	TIN	670 m	MPC · JPL
823870	2016 PK_{10}	—	August 2, 2016	Haleakala	Pan-STARRS 1	HOF	1.9 km	MPC · JPL
823871	2016 PX_{11}	—	June 7, 2016	Haleakala	Pan-STARRS 1	·	850 m	MPC · JPL
823872	2016 PD_{13}	—	May 11, 2015	Mount Lemmon	Mount Lemmon Survey	·	2.5 km	MPC · JPL
823873	2016 PL_{18}	—	September 18, 2011	Mount Lemmon	Mount Lemmon Survey	HYG	1.9 km	MPC · JPL
823874	2016 PS_{21}	—	January 20, 2014	Mount Lemmon	Mount Lemmon Survey	·	1.2 km	MPC · JPL
823875	2016 PZ_{23}	—	August 7, 2016	Haleakala	Pan-STARRS 1	·	860 m	MPC · JPL
823876	2016 PH_{25}	—	January 20, 2015	Haleakala	Pan-STARRS 1	·	440 m	MPC · JPL
823877	2016 PF_{29}	—	April 23, 2015	Haleakala	Pan-STARRS 1	·	1.3 km	MPC · JPL
823878	2016 PA_{30}	—	August 6, 2016	Haleakala	Pan-STARRS 1	EOS	1.4 km	MPC · JPL
823879	2016 PW_{39}	—	February 22, 2007	Catalina	CSS	H	430 m	MPC · JPL
823880	2016 PN_{40}	—	November 11, 2013	Mount Lemmon	Mount Lemmon Survey	·	1.1 km	MPC · JPL
823881	2016 PQ_{40}	—	September 14, 2006	Kitt Peak	Spacewatch	·	540 m	MPC · JPL
823882	2016 PB_{41}	—	April 30, 2012	Kitt Peak	Spacewatch	V	480 m	MPC · JPL
823883	2016 PC_{41}	—	August 7, 2016	Haleakala	Pan-STARRS 1	·	1.5 km	MPC · JPL
823884	2016 PH_{46}	—	August 7, 2016	Haleakala	Pan-STARRS 1	·	1.8 km	MPC · JPL
823885	2016 PO_{52}	—	September 27, 2006	Mount Lemmon	Mount Lemmon Survey	·	530 m	MPC · JPL
823886	2016 PX_{55}	—	September 9, 2002	Palomar	NEAT	·	500 m	MPC · JPL
823887	2016 PZ_{55}	—	July 10, 2016	Mount Lemmon	Mount Lemmon Survey	·	580 m	MPC · JPL
823888	2016 PD_{56}	—	August 7, 2016	Haleakala	Pan-STARRS 1	·	580 m	MPC · JPL
823889	2016 PG_{65}	—	November 13, 2012	Mount Lemmon	Mount Lemmon Survey	GEF	860 m	MPC · JPL
823890	2016 PT_{67}	—	June 22, 2010	Mount Lemmon	Mount Lemmon Survey	TIR	2.1 km	MPC · JPL
823891	2016 PB_{72}	—	May 20, 2015	Haleakala	Pan-STARRS 1	·	2.7 km	MPC · JPL
823892	2016 PU_{73}	—	August 10, 2016	Haleakala	Pan-STARRS 1	·	2.4 km	MPC · JPL
823893	2016 PO_{78}	—	September 20, 2007	Kitt Peak	Spacewatch	·	1.3 km	MPC · JPL
823894	2016 PF_{79}	—	August 1, 2016	Haleakala	Pan-STARRS 1	H	350 m	MPC · JPL
823895	2016 PC_{80}	—	August 8, 2016	Haleakala	Pan-STARRS 1	H	340 m	MPC · JPL
823896	2016 PU_{87}	—	September 27, 2003	Kitt Peak	Spacewatch	MIS	1.8 km	MPC · JPL
823897	2016 PE_{88}	—	November 1, 2005	Mount Lemmon	Mount Lemmon Survey	THM	1.8 km	MPC · JPL
823898	2016 PQ_{90}	—	January 28, 2014	Mount Lemmon	Mount Lemmon Survey	V	490 m	MPC · JPL
823899	2016 PT_{91}	—	October 20, 2011	Mount Lemmon	Mount Lemmon Survey	·	1.4 km	MPC · JPL
823900	2016 PU_{91}	—	October 19, 2006	Kitt Peak	Spacewatch	·	560 m	MPC · JPL

== 823901–824000 ==
back to top

Designation			Discovery			Properties		Ref
Permanent	Provisional	Named after	Date	Site	Discoverer(s)	Category	Diam.	Ref
823901	2016 PW_{92}	—	April 25, 2015	Haleakala	Pan-STARRS 1	GEF	860 m	MPC · JPL
823902	2016 PZ_{92}	—	October 9, 2007	Mount Lemmon	Mount Lemmon Survey	·	1.5 km	MPC · JPL
823903	2016 PH_{93}	—	November 9, 2007	Mount Lemmon	Mount Lemmon Survey	·	1.7 km	MPC · JPL
823904	2016 PU_{93}	—	October 18, 2012	Mount Lemmon	Mount Lemmon Survey	·	1.7 km	MPC · JPL
823905	2016 PY_{93}	—	August 3, 2016	Haleakala	Pan-STARRS 1	MRX	740 m	MPC · JPL
823906	2016 PG_{94}	—	August 10, 2016	Haleakala	Pan-STARRS 1	·	1.2 km	MPC · JPL
823907	2016 PR_{99}	—	March 28, 2015	Haleakala	Pan-STARRS 1	TIR	2.4 km	MPC · JPL
823908	2016 PA_{103}	—	September 21, 2003	Kitt Peak	Spacewatch	·	1.1 km	MPC · JPL
823909	2016 PM_{103}	—	August 14, 2016	Haleakala	Pan-STARRS 1	·	1.2 km	MPC · JPL
823910	2016 PN_{103}	—	September 22, 2003	Kitt Peak	Spacewatch	·	1.3 km	MPC · JPL
823911	2016 PT_{105}	—	August 1, 2016	Haleakala	Pan-STARRS 1	(18466)	1.3 km	MPC · JPL
823912	2016 PT_{107}	—	July 14, 2016	Mount Lemmon	Mount Lemmon Survey	·	1.3 km	MPC · JPL
823913	2016 PA_{108}	—	October 18, 2012	Haleakala	Pan-STARRS 1	·	1.4 km	MPC · JPL
823914	2016 PP_{109}	—	October 18, 2012	Haleakala	Pan-STARRS 1	·	1.4 km	MPC · JPL
823915	2016 PL_{112}	—	August 2, 2016	Haleakala	Pan-STARRS 1	MIS	2.0 km	MPC · JPL
823916	2016 PZ_{112}	—	October 9, 2007	Kitt Peak	Spacewatch	PAD	1.4 km	MPC · JPL
823917	2016 PK_{119}	—	May 25, 2015	Haleakala	Pan-STARRS 1	·	2.2 km	MPC · JPL
823918	2016 PN_{123}	—	September 29, 2005	Kitt Peak	Spacewatch	·	860 m	MPC · JPL
823919	2016 PD_{126}	—	August 14, 2016	Haleakala	Pan-STARRS 1	·	1.7 km	MPC · JPL
823920	2016 PC_{129}	—	August 9, 2016	Haleakala	Pan-STARRS 1	·	1 km	MPC · JPL
823921	2016 PO_{129}	—	August 2, 2016	Haleakala	Pan-STARRS 1	(5)	970 m	MPC · JPL
823922	2016 PO_{131}	—	August 3, 2016	Haleakala	Pan-STARRS 1	PHO	660 m	MPC · JPL
823923	2016 PP_{135}	—	August 8, 2016	Haleakala	Pan-STARRS 1	·	1.7 km	MPC · JPL
823924	2016 PS_{146}	—	August 2, 2016	Haleakala	Pan-STARRS 1	·	1.1 km	MPC · JPL
823925	2016 PV_{147}	—	July 11, 2016	Haleakala	Pan-STARRS 1	(5)	770 m	MPC · JPL
823926	2016 PX_{152}	—	August 2, 2016	Haleakala	Pan-STARRS 1	·	570 m	MPC · JPL
823927	2016 PA_{153}	—	August 2, 2016	Haleakala	Pan-STARRS 1	·	960 m	MPC · JPL
823928	2016 PR_{153}	—	August 2, 2016	Haleakala	Pan-STARRS 1	·	790 m	MPC · JPL
823929	2016 PB_{156}	—	August 2, 2016	Haleakala	Pan-STARRS 1	PHO	560 m	MPC · JPL
823930	2016 PN_{156}	—	August 14, 2016	Haleakala	Pan-STARRS 1	V	390 m	MPC · JPL
823931	2016 PR_{156}	—	October 8, 2012	Haleakala	Pan-STARRS 1	·	1.1 km	MPC · JPL
823932	2016 PV_{156}	—	August 7, 2016	Haleakala	Pan-STARRS 1	EOS	1.3 km	MPC · JPL
823933	2016 PF_{158}	—	August 10, 2016	Haleakala	Pan-STARRS 1	·	510 m	MPC · JPL
823934	2016 PL_{160}	—	August 2, 2016	Haleakala	Pan-STARRS 1	·	1.3 km	MPC · JPL
823935	2016 PO_{160}	—	August 2, 2016	Haleakala	Pan-STARRS 1	EUN	790 m	MPC · JPL
823936	2016 PG_{162}	—	August 2, 2016	Haleakala	Pan-STARRS 1	·	1.0 km	MPC · JPL
823937	2016 PX_{164}	—	August 2, 2016	Haleakala	Pan-STARRS 1	·	870 m	MPC · JPL
823938	2016 PH_{168}	—	August 15, 2009	Kitt Peak	Spacewatch	·	580 m	MPC · JPL
823939	2016 PB_{169}	—	August 8, 2016	Haleakala	Pan-STARRS 1	·	1.3 km	MPC · JPL
823940	2016 PG_{170}	—	August 2, 2016	Haleakala	Pan-STARRS 1	·	550 m	MPC · JPL
823941	2016 PR_{170}	—	August 3, 2016	Haleakala	Pan-STARRS 1	·	1.7 km	MPC · JPL
823942	2016 PW_{173}	—	August 1, 2016	Haleakala	Pan-STARRS 1	·	1.3 km	MPC · JPL
823943	2016 PJ_{174}	—	August 3, 2016	Haleakala	Pan-STARRS 1	·	940 m	MPC · JPL
823944	2016 PR_{177}	—	August 3, 2016	Haleakala	Pan-STARRS 1	·	800 m	MPC · JPL
823945	2016 PU_{177}	—	August 13, 2016	Haleakala	Pan-STARRS 1	PHO	560 m	MPC · JPL
823946	2016 PQ_{179}	—	August 1, 2016	Haleakala	Pan-STARRS 1	·	1.8 km	MPC · JPL
823947	2016 PS_{179}	—	August 2, 2016	Haleakala	Pan-STARRS 1	EOS	1.3 km	MPC · JPL
823948	2016 PV_{179}	—	August 2, 2016	Haleakala	Pan-STARRS 1	·	1.4 km	MPC · JPL
823949	2016 PA_{180}	—	August 3, 2016	Haleakala	Pan-STARRS 1	KOR	990 m	MPC · JPL
823950	2016 PV_{180}	—	August 3, 2016	Haleakala	Pan-STARRS 1	·	1.2 km	MPC · JPL
823951	2016 PX_{183}	—	August 2, 2016	Haleakala	Pan-STARRS 1	·	1.4 km	MPC · JPL
823952	2016 PG_{184}	—	August 3, 2016	Haleakala	Pan-STARRS 1	·	810 m	MPC · JPL
823953	2016 PP_{184}	—	August 1, 2016	Haleakala	Pan-STARRS 1	·	780 m	MPC · JPL
823954	2016 PU_{184}	—	August 11, 2016	Haleakala	Pan-STARRS 1	TIR	2.0 km	MPC · JPL
823955	2016 PV_{185}	—	August 3, 2016	Haleakala	Pan-STARRS 1	·	760 m	MPC · JPL
823956	2016 PG_{188}	—	August 3, 2016	Haleakala	Pan-STARRS 1	·	760 m	MPC · JPL
823957	2016 PV_{188}	—	August 2, 2016	Haleakala	Pan-STARRS 1	·	1.0 km	MPC · JPL
823958	2016 PN_{189}	—	August 1, 2016	Haleakala	Pan-STARRS 1	·	1.5 km	MPC · JPL
823959	2016 PO_{190}	—	August 3, 2016	Haleakala	Pan-STARRS 1	·	1.3 km	MPC · JPL
823960	2016 PX_{190}	—	August 14, 2016	Haleakala	Pan-STARRS 1	(2076)	590 m	MPC · JPL
823961	2016 PJ_{191}	—	August 3, 2016	Haleakala	Pan-STARRS 1	·	1.6 km	MPC · JPL
823962	2016 PH_{196}	—	August 3, 2016	Haleakala	Pan-STARRS 1	·	950 m	MPC · JPL
823963	2016 PJ_{201}	—	August 1, 2016	Haleakala	Pan-STARRS 1	PHO	630 m	MPC · JPL
823964	2016 PF_{204}	—	August 3, 2016	Haleakala	Pan-STARRS 1	KOR	1.2 km	MPC · JPL
823965	2016 PR_{206}	—	August 14, 2016	Haleakala	Pan-STARRS 1	·	1.5 km	MPC · JPL
823966	2016 PL_{210}	—	August 9, 2016	Haleakala	Pan-STARRS 1	EOS	1.1 km	MPC · JPL
823967	2016 PP_{212}	—	August 7, 2016	Haleakala	Pan-STARRS 1	EOS	1.3 km	MPC · JPL
823968	2016 PS_{216}	—	August 15, 2016	Haleakala	Pan-STARRS 1	·	1.5 km	MPC · JPL
823969	2016 PB_{218}	—	August 7, 2016	Haleakala	Pan-STARRS 1	·	1.4 km	MPC · JPL
823970	2016 PK_{223}	—	August 2, 2016	Haleakala	Pan-STARRS 1	·	1.6 km	MPC · JPL
823971	2016 PN_{223}	—	August 1, 2016	Haleakala	Pan-STARRS 1	·	1.5 km	MPC · JPL
823972	2016 PT_{224}	—	March 11, 2014	Kitt Peak	Spacewatch	EOS	1.3 km	MPC · JPL
823973	2016 PB_{228}	—	August 8, 2016	Haleakala	Pan-STARRS 1	·	1.6 km	MPC · JPL
823974	2016 PR_{228}	—	August 7, 2016	Haleakala	Pan-STARRS 1	·	1.2 km	MPC · JPL
823975	2016 PG_{241}	—	March 22, 2015	Haleakala	Pan-STARRS 1	·	1.8 km	MPC · JPL
823976	2016 PO_{252}	—	August 3, 2016	Haleakala	Pan-STARRS 1	·	450 m	MPC · JPL
823977	2016 PS_{257}	—	August 7, 2016	Haleakala	Pan-STARRS 1	VER	1.9 km	MPC · JPL
823978	2016 PG_{265}	—	August 14, 2016	Haleakala	Pan-STARRS 1	·	2.3 km	MPC · JPL
823979	2016 PX_{265}	—	August 2, 2016	Haleakala	Pan-STARRS 1	·	2.1 km	MPC · JPL
823980	2016 PM_{269}	—	August 14, 2016	Haleakala	Pan-STARRS 1	·	1.7 km	MPC · JPL
823981	2016 PN_{269}	—	August 14, 2016	Haleakala	Pan-STARRS 1	EOS	1.4 km	MPC · JPL
823982	2016 PU_{286}	—	August 7, 2016	Haleakala	Pan-STARRS 1	·	590 m	MPC · JPL
823983	2016 PY_{290}	—	August 2, 2016	Haleakala	Pan-STARRS 1	·	1.4 km	MPC · JPL
823984	2016 PY_{293}	—	August 7, 2016	Haleakala	Pan-STARRS 1	·	1.4 km	MPC · JPL
823985	2016 QW_{1}	—	January 18, 2015	Haleakala	Pan-STARRS 1	H	400 m	MPC · JPL
823986	2016 QR_{3}	—	October 18, 2012	Haleakala	Pan-STARRS 1	AEO	790 m	MPC · JPL
823987	2016 QE_{5}	—	August 3, 2016	Haleakala	Pan-STARRS 1	MAS	510 m	MPC · JPL
823988	2016 QX_{7}	—	August 2, 2016	Haleakala	Pan-STARRS 1	MRX	780 m	MPC · JPL
823989	2016 QA_{8}	—	August 28, 2005	Siding Spring	SSS	·	900 m	MPC · JPL
823990	2016 QR_{8}	—	July 13, 2016	Mount Lemmon	Mount Lemmon Survey	·	2.7 km	MPC · JPL
823991	2016 QE_{9}	—	January 1, 2014	Haleakala	Pan-STARRS 1	·	640 m	MPC · JPL
823992	2016 QP_{12}	—	March 21, 2012	Mount Lemmon	Mount Lemmon Survey	·	470 m	MPC · JPL
823993	2016 QY_{16}	—	November 2, 2011	Mount Lemmon	Mount Lemmon Survey	·	2.3 km	MPC · JPL
823994	2016 QE_{22}	—	August 26, 2016	Haleakala	Pan-STARRS 1	V	430 m	MPC · JPL
823995	2016 QN_{23}	—	August 26, 2016	Haleakala	Pan-STARRS 1	·	1.1 km	MPC · JPL
823996	2016 QA_{24}	—	May 21, 2015	Haleakala	Pan-STARRS 1	VER	1.8 km	MPC · JPL
823997	2016 QK_{25}	—	March 21, 2015	Haleakala	Pan-STARRS 1	·	1.4 km	MPC · JPL
823998	2016 QP_{25}	—	August 14, 2016	Haleakala	Pan-STARRS 1	·	1.3 km	MPC · JPL
823999	2016 QS_{25}	—	September 13, 2007	Kitt Peak	Spacewatch	·	1.2 km	MPC · JPL
824000	2016 QW_{25}	—	November 16, 2006	Mount Lemmon	Mount Lemmon Survey	·	520 m	MPC · JPL

back to top
