= List of minor planets: 760001–761000 =

The following is a partial list of minor planets, running from minor-planet number 760001 through 761000, inclusive. The primary data for this and other partial lists is based on JPL's "Small-Body Orbital Elements" and data available from the Minor Planet Center. Critical list information is also provided by the MPC, unless otherwise specified from Lowell Observatory. A detailed description of the table's columns and additional sources are given on the main page including a complete list of every page in this series, and a statistical break-up on the dynamical classification of minor planets.

Also see the summary list of all named bodies in numerical and alphabetical order, and the corresponding naming citations for the number range of this particular list. New namings may only be added to this list after official publication, as the preannouncement of names is condemned by the Working Group for Small Bodies Nomenclature of the International Astronomical Union.

| Near-Earth obj. | MBA (inner) | MBA (outer) | Centaur |
| Mars-crosser | MBA (middle) | Jupiter trojan | Trans-Neptunian obj. |
| Unclassified |

== 760001–760100 ==
| Designation | | | Discovery | | | Properties | | Ref |
| Permanent | Provisional | Named after | Date | Site | Discoverer(s) | Category | Diam. | Ref |
|---|---|---|---|---|---|---|---|---|
| 760001 | 2008 GN_{30} | — | April 3, 2008 | Mount Lemmon | Mount Lemmon Survey | · | 2.3 km | MPC · JPL |
| 760002 | 2008 GB_{34} | — | April 3, 2008 | Mount Lemmon | Mount Lemmon Survey | · | 1.8 km | MPC · JPL |
| 760003 | 2008 GY_{34} | — | April 3, 2008 | Mount Lemmon | Mount Lemmon Survey | NYS | 860 m | MPC · JPL |
| 760004 | 2008 GZ_{39} | — | February 18, 2008 | Mount Lemmon | Mount Lemmon Survey | · | 1.5 km | MPC · JPL |
| 760005 | 2008 GO_{47} | — | April 4, 2008 | Kitt Peak | Spacewatch | · | 1.7 km | MPC · JPL |
| 760006 | 2008 GV_{59} | — | March 28, 2008 | Mount Lemmon | Mount Lemmon Survey | · | 1.3 km | MPC · JPL |
| 760007 | 2008 GK_{90} | — | February 13, 2008 | Mount Lemmon | Mount Lemmon Survey | · | 1.3 km | MPC · JPL |
| 760008 | 2008 GQ_{96} | — | April 4, 2008 | Kitt Peak | Spacewatch | · | 1.4 km | MPC · JPL |
| 760009 | 2008 GE_{105} | — | February 28, 2008 | Kitt Peak | Spacewatch | · | 1.4 km | MPC · JPL |
| 760010 | 2008 GJ_{122} | — | April 13, 2008 | Kitt Peak | Spacewatch | V | 480 m | MPC · JPL |
| 760011 | 2008 GM_{129} | — | April 3, 2008 | Mount Lemmon | Mount Lemmon Survey | · | 1.2 km | MPC · JPL |
| 760012 | 2008 GZ_{134} | — | April 8, 2008 | Kitt Peak | Spacewatch | · | 810 m | MPC · JPL |
| 760013 | 2008 GU_{152} | — | April 15, 2008 | Mount Lemmon | Mount Lemmon Survey | T_{j} (2.98) | 2.5 km | MPC · JPL |
| 760014 | 2008 GY_{152} | — | April 6, 2008 | Mount Lemmon | Mount Lemmon Survey | · | 1.4 km | MPC · JPL |
| 760015 | 2008 GG_{153} | — | November 6, 2010 | Mount Lemmon | Mount Lemmon Survey | · | 610 m | MPC · JPL |
| 760016 | 2008 GU_{153} | — | April 11, 2008 | Mount Lemmon | Mount Lemmon Survey | · | 1.3 km | MPC · JPL |
| 760017 | 2008 GX_{153} | — | April 14, 2008 | Mount Lemmon | Mount Lemmon Survey | · | 1.4 km | MPC · JPL |
| 760018 | 2008 GR_{154} | — | April 9, 2008 | Mount Lemmon | Mount Lemmon Survey | · | 1.2 km | MPC · JPL |
| 760019 | 2008 GU_{154} | — | April 6, 2008 | Mount Lemmon | Mount Lemmon Survey | · | 1.5 km | MPC · JPL |
| 760020 | 2008 GK_{155} | — | April 12, 2008 | Mount Lemmon | Mount Lemmon Survey | · | 1.3 km | MPC · JPL |
| 760021 | 2008 GN_{155} | — | March 27, 2008 | Kitt Peak | Spacewatch | · | 1.7 km | MPC · JPL |
| 760022 | 2008 GV_{155} | — | April 15, 2013 | Haleakala | Pan-STARRS 1 | · | 1.6 km | MPC · JPL |
| 760023 | 2008 GJ_{156} | — | April 8, 2008 | Kitt Peak | Spacewatch | · | 1.4 km | MPC · JPL |
| 760024 | 2008 GP_{156} | — | April 13, 2008 | Mount Lemmon | Mount Lemmon Survey | · | 1.9 km | MPC · JPL |
| 760025 | 2008 GD_{159} | — | September 2, 2014 | Haleakala | Pan-STARRS 1 | · | 1.5 km | MPC · JPL |
| 760026 | 2008 GE_{162} | — | April 5, 2008 | Anderson Mesa | Wasserman, L. H. | · | 1.3 km | MPC · JPL |
| 760027 | 2008 GF_{163} | — | November 2, 2010 | Mount Lemmon | Mount Lemmon Survey | KOR | 980 m | MPC · JPL |
| 760028 | 2008 GD_{164} | — | April 1, 2008 | Mount Lemmon | Mount Lemmon Survey | T_{j} (2.94) | 2.8 km | MPC · JPL |
| 760029 | 2008 GF_{165} | — | August 23, 2014 | Haleakala | Pan-STARRS 1 | HOF | 2.0 km | MPC · JPL |
| 760030 | 2008 GG_{165} | — | April 3, 2008 | Kitt Peak | Spacewatch | MRX | 740 m | MPC · JPL |
| 760031 | 2008 GJ_{166} | — | August 27, 2014 | Haleakala | Pan-STARRS 1 | · | 1.2 km | MPC · JPL |
| 760032 | 2008 GF_{167} | — | April 7, 2008 | Kitt Peak | Spacewatch | · | 560 m | MPC · JPL |
| 760033 | 2008 GZ_{167} | — | April 6, 2008 | Mount Lemmon | Mount Lemmon Survey | EOS | 1.6 km | MPC · JPL |
| 760034 | 2008 GU_{168} | — | April 6, 2008 | Mount Lemmon | Mount Lemmon Survey | · | 780 m | MPC · JPL |
| 760035 | 2008 GW_{168} | — | April 5, 2008 | Anderson Mesa | Wasserman, L. H. | · | 1.5 km | MPC · JPL |
| 760036 | 2008 GD_{171} | — | April 6, 2008 | Kitt Peak | Spacewatch | L5 | 6.2 km | MPC · JPL |
| 760037 | 2008 GC_{172} | — | April 14, 2008 | Mount Lemmon | Mount Lemmon Survey | · | 1.4 km | MPC · JPL |
| 760038 | 2008 GZ_{172} | — | April 4, 2008 | Mount Lemmon | Mount Lemmon Survey | · | 1.3 km | MPC · JPL |
| 760039 | 2008 GJ_{174} | — | April 15, 2008 | Mount Lemmon | Mount Lemmon Survey | · | 1.7 km | MPC · JPL |
| 760040 | 2008 GO_{175} | — | April 5, 2008 | Mount Lemmon | Mount Lemmon Survey | · | 2.1 km | MPC · JPL |
| 760041 | 2008 GR_{175} | — | April 9, 2008 | Kitt Peak | Spacewatch | · | 410 m | MPC · JPL |
| 760042 | 2008 GE_{177} | — | April 4, 2008 | Mount Lemmon | Mount Lemmon Survey | · | 870 m | MPC · JPL |
| 760043 | 2008 GS_{178} | — | April 13, 2008 | Kitt Peak | Spacewatch | HOF | 1.9 km | MPC · JPL |
| 760044 | 2008 GK_{179} | — | April 15, 2008 | Mount Lemmon | Mount Lemmon Survey | L5 | 6.4 km | MPC · JPL |
| 760045 | 2008 HZ_{7} | — | April 24, 2008 | Kitt Peak | Spacewatch | BRA | 1.4 km | MPC · JPL |
| 760046 | 2008 HM_{8} | — | April 3, 2008 | Mount Lemmon | Mount Lemmon Survey | · | 770 m | MPC · JPL |
| 760047 | 2008 HH_{15} | — | April 6, 2008 | Mount Lemmon | Mount Lemmon Survey | · | 1.6 km | MPC · JPL |
| 760048 | 2008 HS_{15} | — | April 25, 2008 | Kitt Peak | Spacewatch | JUN | 930 m | MPC · JPL |
| 760049 | 2008 HR_{17} | — | April 3, 2008 | Mount Lemmon | Mount Lemmon Survey | · | 1.7 km | MPC · JPL |
| 760050 | 2008 HQ_{23} | — | April 3, 2008 | Mount Lemmon | Mount Lemmon Survey | · | 1.3 km | MPC · JPL |
| 760051 | 2008 HQ_{28} | — | April 28, 2008 | Kitt Peak | Spacewatch | · | 510 m | MPC · JPL |
| 760052 | 2008 HY_{46} | — | April 28, 2008 | Mount Lemmon | Mount Lemmon Survey | · | 1.9 km | MPC · JPL |
| 760053 | 2008 HJ_{49} | — | April 29, 2008 | Mount Lemmon | Mount Lemmon Survey | HNS | 790 m | MPC · JPL |
| 760054 | 2008 HP_{49} | — | April 29, 2008 | Kitt Peak | Spacewatch | · | 1.5 km | MPC · JPL |
| 760055 | 2008 HS_{52} | — | April 29, 2008 | Mount Lemmon | Mount Lemmon Survey | HOF | 1.8 km | MPC · JPL |
| 760056 | 2008 HD_{54} | — | April 7, 2008 | Kitt Peak | Spacewatch | L5 | 6.9 km | MPC · JPL |
| 760057 | 2008 HY_{57} | — | April 9, 2008 | Kitt Peak | Spacewatch | · | 680 m | MPC · JPL |
| 760058 | 2008 HO_{63} | — | April 29, 2008 | Kitt Peak | Spacewatch | · | 1.3 km | MPC · JPL |
| 760059 | 2008 HH_{67} | — | April 28, 2008 | Kitt Peak | Spacewatch | · | 1.7 km | MPC · JPL |
| 760060 | 2008 HT_{70} | — | April 4, 2008 | Kitt Peak | Spacewatch | · | 1.1 km | MPC · JPL |
| 760061 | 2008 HC_{73} | — | August 3, 2016 | Haleakala | Pan-STARRS 1 | · | 810 m | MPC · JPL |
| 760062 | 2008 HL_{73} | — | October 12, 2010 | Mount Lemmon | Mount Lemmon Survey | · | 1.5 km | MPC · JPL |
| 760063 | 2008 HQ_{76} | — | April 23, 2015 | Haleakala | Pan-STARRS 1 | SYL | 3.0 km | MPC · JPL |
| 760064 | 2008 HT_{76} | — | April 30, 2008 | Kitt Peak | Spacewatch | · | 1.4 km | MPC · JPL |
| 760065 | 2008 HG_{77} | — | April 29, 2008 | Mount Lemmon | Mount Lemmon Survey | AGN | 980 m | MPC · JPL |
| 760066 | 2008 HS_{77} | — | April 27, 2008 | Mount Lemmon | Mount Lemmon Survey | · | 1.6 km | MPC · JPL |
| 760067 | 2008 JG_{2} | — | May 2, 2008 | Kitt Peak | Spacewatch | · | 1.5 km | MPC · JPL |
| 760068 | 2008 JP_{5} | — | May 3, 2008 | Mount Lemmon | Mount Lemmon Survey | · | 1.6 km | MPC · JPL |
| 760069 | 2008 JR_{5} | — | April 7, 2008 | Kitt Peak | Spacewatch | L5 | 7.0 km | MPC · JPL |
| 760070 | 2008 JG_{28} | — | May 8, 2008 | Kitt Peak | Spacewatch | · | 1.7 km | MPC · JPL |
| 760071 | 2008 JQ_{34} | — | May 15, 2008 | Kitt Peak | Spacewatch | · | 1.8 km | MPC · JPL |
| 760072 | 2008 JV_{44} | — | August 15, 2004 | Campo Imperatore | CINEOS | BRA | 1.2 km | MPC · JPL |
| 760073 | 2008 JN_{46} | — | May 13, 2008 | Mount Lemmon | Mount Lemmon Survey | THM | 2.0 km | MPC · JPL |
| 760074 | 2008 JV_{46} | — | February 13, 2011 | Mount Lemmon | Mount Lemmon Survey | · | 540 m | MPC · JPL |
| 760075 | 2008 JR_{47} | — | October 17, 2010 | Mount Lemmon | Mount Lemmon Survey | · | 1.3 km | MPC · JPL |
| 760076 | 2008 JT_{47} | — | January 13, 2018 | Mount Lemmon | Mount Lemmon Survey | · | 660 m | MPC · JPL |
| 760077 | 2008 JD_{49} | — | November 21, 2017 | Haleakala | Pan-STARRS 1 | · | 920 m | MPC · JPL |
| 760078 | 2008 JT_{50} | — | May 14, 2008 | Mount Lemmon | Mount Lemmon Survey | · | 970 m | MPC · JPL |
| 760079 | 2008 JU_{50} | — | May 7, 2008 | Mount Lemmon | Mount Lemmon Survey | · | 2.7 km | MPC · JPL |
| 760080 | 2008 JM_{51} | — | May 5, 2008 | Mount Lemmon | Mount Lemmon Survey | EOS | 1.6 km | MPC · JPL |
| 760081 | 2008 JZ_{51} | — | May 15, 2008 | Mount Lemmon | Mount Lemmon Survey | · | 1.3 km | MPC · JPL |
| 760082 | 2008 KW_{3} | — | April 29, 2008 | Mount Lemmon | Mount Lemmon Survey | · | 2.9 km | MPC · JPL |
| 760083 | 2008 KS_{4} | — | May 27, 2008 | Kitt Peak | Spacewatch | DOR | 1.7 km | MPC · JPL |
| 760084 | 2008 KQ_{9} | — | April 6, 2008 | Mount Lemmon | Mount Lemmon Survey | · | 1.6 km | MPC · JPL |
| 760085 | 2008 KE_{13} | — | May 13, 2008 | Mount Lemmon | Mount Lemmon Survey | · | 1.4 km | MPC · JPL |
| 760086 | 2008 KY_{13} | — | May 14, 2008 | Kitt Peak | Spacewatch | · | 1.3 km | MPC · JPL |
| 760087 | 2008 KD_{16} | — | May 3, 2008 | Kitt Peak | Spacewatch | · | 1.3 km | MPC · JPL |
| 760088 | 2008 KM_{23} | — | May 28, 2008 | Kitt Peak | Spacewatch | AGN | 950 m | MPC · JPL |
| 760089 | 2008 KE_{30} | — | May 29, 2008 | Kitt Peak | Spacewatch | L5 | 7.1 km | MPC · JPL |
| 760090 | 2008 KF_{35} | — | May 27, 2008 | Kitt Peak | Spacewatch | · | 850 m | MPC · JPL |
| 760091 | 2008 KL_{44} | — | September 9, 2013 | Haleakala | Pan-STARRS 1 | · | 1.3 km | MPC · JPL |
| 760092 | 2008 KO_{45} | — | October 15, 2013 | Kitt Peak | Spacewatch | · | 1.0 km | MPC · JPL |
| 760093 | 2008 KA_{48} | — | October 2, 2014 | Haleakala | Pan-STARRS 1 | · | 1.5 km | MPC · JPL |
| 760094 | 2008 LY_{4} | — | June 3, 2008 | Mount Lemmon | Mount Lemmon Survey | NYS | 1.0 km | MPC · JPL |
| 760095 | 2008 LD_{20} | — | March 20, 2017 | Haleakala | Pan-STARRS 1 | · | 1.5 km | MPC · JPL |
| 760096 | 2008 OL_{26} | — | August 26, 2012 | Haleakala | Pan-STARRS 1 | · | 900 m | MPC · JPL |
| 760097 | 2008 OM_{26} | — | February 12, 2011 | Mount Lemmon | Mount Lemmon Survey | · | 1.3 km | MPC · JPL |
| 760098 | 2008 OK_{28} | — | January 31, 2016 | Haleakala | Pan-STARRS 1 | · | 1.5 km | MPC · JPL |
| 760099 | 2008 ON_{29} | — | July 26, 2008 | Siding Spring | SSS | · | 1.1 km | MPC · JPL |
| 760100 | 2008 OC_{30} | — | April 2, 2011 | Kitt Peak | Spacewatch | · | 520 m | MPC · JPL |

== 760101–760200 ==
back to top

| Designation | | | Discovery | | | Properties | | Ref |
| Permanent | Provisional | Named after | Date | Site | Discoverer(s) | Category | Diam. | Ref |
|---|---|---|---|---|---|---|---|---|
| 760101 | 2008 OK_{30} | — | July 29, 2008 | Kitt Peak | Spacewatch | · | 970 m | MPC · JPL |
| 760102 | 2008 PM_{14} | — | August 10, 2008 | Dauban | C. Rinner, F. Kugel | · | 1.7 km | MPC · JPL |
| 760103 | 2008 PY_{22} | — | January 14, 2016 | Haleakala | Pan-STARRS 1 | · | 1.9 km | MPC · JPL |
| 760104 | 2008 PA_{24} | — | August 7, 2008 | Kitt Peak | Spacewatch | · | 1.4 km | MPC · JPL |
| 760105 | 2008 QR_{14} | — | August 20, 2008 | Kitt Peak | Spacewatch | · | 1.9 km | MPC · JPL |
| 760106 | 2008 QV_{29} | — | August 26, 2008 | La Sagra | OAM | · | 2.5 km | MPC · JPL |
| 760107 | 2008 RL_{7} | — | September 3, 2008 | Kitt Peak | Spacewatch | · | 1.8 km | MPC · JPL |
| 760108 | 2008 RX_{10} | — | September 3, 2008 | Kitt Peak | Spacewatch | · | 690 m | MPC · JPL |
| 760109 | 2008 RC_{14} | — | September 4, 2008 | Kitt Peak | Spacewatch | L4 · ERY | 5.8 km | MPC · JPL |
| 760110 | 2008 RB_{42} | — | September 2, 2008 | Kitt Peak | Spacewatch | · | 1.4 km | MPC · JPL |
| 760111 | 2008 RJ_{44} | — | September 2, 2008 | Kitt Peak | Spacewatch | · | 1.4 km | MPC · JPL |
| 760112 | 2008 RQ_{50} | — | September 3, 2008 | Kitt Peak | Spacewatch | · | 980 m | MPC · JPL |
| 760113 | 2008 RH_{60} | — | September 4, 2008 | Kitt Peak | Spacewatch | · | 900 m | MPC · JPL |
| 760114 | 2008 RJ_{63} | — | September 4, 2008 | Kitt Peak | Spacewatch | · | 1.5 km | MPC · JPL |
| 760115 | 2008 RN_{76} | — | September 6, 2008 | Kitt Peak | Spacewatch | L4 | 5.5 km | MPC · JPL |
| 760116 | 2008 RL_{81} | — | October 19, 2003 | Kitt Peak | Spacewatch | · | 1.1 km | MPC · JPL |
| 760117 | 2008 RC_{83} | — | September 28, 2003 | Kitt Peak | Spacewatch | · | 1.8 km | MPC · JPL |
| 760118 | 2008 RT_{84} | — | September 4, 2008 | Kitt Peak | Spacewatch | H | 250 m | MPC · JPL |
| 760119 | 2008 RC_{88} | — | October 2, 2003 | Kitt Peak | Spacewatch | · | 1.4 km | MPC · JPL |
| 760120 | 2008 RU_{93} | — | September 6, 2008 | Kitt Peak | Spacewatch | EOS | 1.3 km | MPC · JPL |
| 760121 | 2008 RC_{99} | — | September 2, 2008 | Kitt Peak | Spacewatch | · | 1.6 km | MPC · JPL |
| 760122 | 2008 RP_{105} | — | September 6, 2008 | Mount Lemmon | Mount Lemmon Survey | · | 2.2 km | MPC · JPL |
| 760123 | 2008 RV_{107} | — | September 9, 2008 | Mount Lemmon | Mount Lemmon Survey | · | 1.1 km | MPC · JPL |
| 760124 | 2008 RJ_{108} | — | September 9, 2008 | Mount Lemmon | Mount Lemmon Survey | · | 1.8 km | MPC · JPL |
| 760125 | 2008 RJ_{114} | — | September 6, 2008 | Mount Lemmon | Mount Lemmon Survey | EOS | 1.4 km | MPC · JPL |
| 760126 | 2008 RM_{116} | — | September 7, 2008 | Mount Lemmon | Mount Lemmon Survey | V | 560 m | MPC · JPL |
| 760127 | 2008 RC_{123} | — | September 5, 2008 | Kitt Peak | Spacewatch | EOS | 1.4 km | MPC · JPL |
| 760128 | 2008 RD_{128} | — | September 7, 2008 | Mount Lemmon | Mount Lemmon Survey | (1118) | 2.4 km | MPC · JPL |
| 760129 | 2008 RM_{129} | — | September 7, 2008 | Mount Lemmon | Mount Lemmon Survey | · | 570 m | MPC · JPL |
| 760130 | 2008 RB_{130} | — | September 7, 2008 | Mount Lemmon | Mount Lemmon Survey | · | 2.0 km | MPC · JPL |
| 760131 | 2008 RE_{135} | — | September 2, 2008 | Kitt Peak | Spacewatch | · | 1.6 km | MPC · JPL |
| 760132 | 2008 RX_{150} | — | September 5, 2008 | Kitt Peak | Spacewatch | T_{j} (2.98) · 3:2 | 3.9 km | MPC · JPL |
| 760133 | 2008 RN_{153} | — | October 17, 2012 | Mount Lemmon | Mount Lemmon Survey | · | 550 m | MPC · JPL |
| 760134 | 2008 RS_{154} | — | September 5, 2008 | Kitt Peak | Spacewatch | EOS | 1.3 km | MPC · JPL |
| 760135 | 2008 RG_{156} | — | August 8, 2013 | Haleakala | Pan-STARRS 1 | · | 1.5 km | MPC · JPL |
| 760136 | 2008 RP_{158} | — | September 4, 2008 | Kitt Peak | Spacewatch | EUP | 3.6 km | MPC · JPL |
| 760137 | 2008 RO_{159} | — | February 2, 2014 | Mount Lemmon | Mount Lemmon Survey | · | 920 m | MPC · JPL |
| 760138 | 2008 RC_{164} | — | September 5, 2008 | Kitt Peak | Spacewatch | · | 1.8 km | MPC · JPL |
| 760139 | 2008 RE_{164} | — | October 22, 2014 | Westfield | International Astronomical Search Collaboration | · | 2.2 km | MPC · JPL |
| 760140 | 2008 RX_{164} | — | September 5, 2008 | Kitt Peak | Spacewatch | L4 | 5.3 km | MPC · JPL |
| 760141 | 2008 RP_{167} | — | September 29, 2003 | Apache Point | SDSS | · | 1.2 km | MPC · JPL |
| 760142 | 2008 RS_{167} | — | September 6, 2008 | Mount Lemmon | Mount Lemmon Survey | · | 1.2 km | MPC · JPL |
| 760143 | 2008 RU_{167} | — | September 7, 2008 | Mount Lemmon | Mount Lemmon Survey | · | 560 m | MPC · JPL |
| 760144 | 2008 RJ_{169} | — | October 18, 2003 | Kitt Peak | Spacewatch | EOS | 1.3 km | MPC · JPL |
| 760145 | 2008 RP_{169} | — | September 4, 2008 | Kitt Peak | Spacewatch | · | 1.7 km | MPC · JPL |
| 760146 | 2008 RG_{170} | — | September 4, 2008 | Kitt Peak | Spacewatch | · | 920 m | MPC · JPL |
| 760147 | 2008 RW_{170} | — | September 2, 2008 | Kitt Peak | Spacewatch | EOS | 1.5 km | MPC · JPL |
| 760148 | 2008 RD_{171} | — | September 6, 2008 | Kitt Peak | Spacewatch | 3:2 | 3.9 km | MPC · JPL |
| 760149 | 2008 RP_{172} | — | September 4, 2008 | Kitt Peak | Spacewatch | · | 1.4 km | MPC · JPL |
| 760150 | 2008 RB_{174} | — | September 6, 2008 | Kitt Peak | Spacewatch | · | 710 m | MPC · JPL |
| 760151 | 2008 RP_{174} | — | September 4, 2008 | Kitt Peak | Spacewatch | · | 1.5 km | MPC · JPL |
| 760152 | 2008 RJ_{175} | — | September 6, 2008 | Mount Lemmon | Mount Lemmon Survey | · | 2.3 km | MPC · JPL |
| 760153 | 2008 RY_{176} | — | September 6, 2008 | Mount Lemmon | Mount Lemmon Survey | · | 1.4 km | MPC · JPL |
| 760154 | 2008 RO_{177} | — | September 5, 2008 | Kitt Peak | Spacewatch | · | 1.4 km | MPC · JPL |
| 760155 | 2008 RV_{181} | — | September 4, 2008 | Kitt Peak | Spacewatch | · | 1.5 km | MPC · JPL |
| 760156 | 2008 RB_{182} | — | September 6, 2008 | Kitt Peak | Spacewatch | L4 | 6.6 km | MPC · JPL |
| 760157 | 2008 RZ_{184} | — | September 9, 2008 | Mount Lemmon | Mount Lemmon Survey | · | 1.5 km | MPC · JPL |
| 760158 | 2008 SE_{21} | — | October 13, 2005 | Kitt Peak | Spacewatch | · | 430 m | MPC · JPL |
| 760159 | 2008 SU_{21} | — | September 19, 2008 | Kitt Peak | Spacewatch | MAS | 590 m | MPC · JPL |
| 760160 | 2008 SU_{48} | — | September 20, 2008 | Mount Lemmon | Mount Lemmon Survey | · | 460 m | MPC · JPL |
| 760161 | 2008 SG_{58} | — | September 20, 2008 | Kitt Peak | Spacewatch | · | 510 m | MPC · JPL |
| 760162 | 2008 SH_{71} | — | September 22, 2008 | Kitt Peak | Spacewatch | · | 1.1 km | MPC · JPL |
| 760163 | 2008 ST_{79} | — | September 23, 2008 | Mount Lemmon | Mount Lemmon Survey | · | 1.4 km | MPC · JPL |
| 760164 | 2008 SA_{81} | — | September 23, 2008 | Mount Lemmon | Mount Lemmon Survey | · | 1.8 km | MPC · JPL |
| 760165 | 2008 SY_{85} | — | September 20, 2008 | Kitt Peak | Spacewatch | VER | 2.0 km | MPC · JPL |
| 760166 | 2008 ST_{96} | — | September 21, 2008 | Kitt Peak | Spacewatch | · | 1.6 km | MPC · JPL |
| 760167 | 2008 SB_{109} | — | September 22, 2008 | Mount Lemmon | Mount Lemmon Survey | · | 2.5 km | MPC · JPL |
| 760168 | 2008 SL_{115} | — | September 22, 2008 | Kitt Peak | Spacewatch | · | 1.8 km | MPC · JPL |
| 760169 | 2008 SY_{119} | — | September 22, 2008 | Mount Lemmon | Mount Lemmon Survey | · | 1.1 km | MPC · JPL |
| 760170 | 2008 SP_{128} | — | September 22, 2008 | Kitt Peak | Spacewatch | MRX | 720 m | MPC · JPL |
| 760171 | 2008 SU_{144} | — | September 25, 2008 | Mount Lemmon | Mount Lemmon Survey | · | 1.6 km | MPC · JPL |
| 760172 | 2008 SS_{189} | — | September 9, 2008 | Mount Lemmon | Mount Lemmon Survey | · | 1.7 km | MPC · JPL |
| 760173 | 2008 SP_{193} | — | September 25, 2008 | Kitt Peak | Spacewatch | · | 650 m | MPC · JPL |
| 760174 | 2008 SY_{202} | — | September 26, 2008 | Kitt Peak | Spacewatch | · | 1.5 km | MPC · JPL |
| 760175 | 2008 ST_{209} | — | September 5, 2008 | Kitt Peak | Spacewatch | · | 2.6 km | MPC · JPL |
| 760176 | 2008 ST_{213} | — | September 29, 2008 | Kitt Peak | Spacewatch | · | 1.2 km | MPC · JPL |
| 760177 | 2008 SA_{215} | — | September 10, 2008 | Kitt Peak | Spacewatch | · | 1.2 km | MPC · JPL |
| 760178 | 2008 SF_{221} | — | September 25, 2008 | Mount Lemmon | Mount Lemmon Survey | EOS | 1.2 km | MPC · JPL |
| 760179 | 2008 SZ_{225} | — | September 26, 2008 | Kitt Peak | Spacewatch | EOS | 1.4 km | MPC · JPL |
| 760180 | 2008 SM_{228} | — | September 28, 2008 | Mount Lemmon | Mount Lemmon Survey | · | 2.3 km | MPC · JPL |
| 760181 | 2008 SE_{237} | — | September 6, 2008 | Kitt Peak | Spacewatch | · | 1.7 km | MPC · JPL |
| 760182 | 2008 SD_{238} | — | September 25, 2008 | Kitt Peak | Spacewatch | NYS | 1 km | MPC · JPL |
| 760183 | 2008 SK_{249} | — | September 22, 2008 | Mount Lemmon | Mount Lemmon Survey | · | 1.3 km | MPC · JPL |
| 760184 | 2008 SW_{252} | — | September 20, 2008 | Mount Lemmon | Mount Lemmon Survey | · | 2.0 km | MPC · JPL |
| 760185 | 2008 SG_{261} | — | September 23, 2008 | Kitt Peak | Spacewatch | · | 1.2 km | MPC · JPL |
| 760186 | 2008 SX_{264} | — | September 26, 2008 | Kitt Peak | Spacewatch | · | 1.7 km | MPC · JPL |
| 760187 | 2008 SA_{268} | — | September 23, 2008 | Kitt Peak | Spacewatch | · | 1.7 km | MPC · JPL |
| 760188 | 2008 SA_{275} | — | September 22, 2008 | Kitt Peak | Spacewatch | · | 2.4 km | MPC · JPL |
| 760189 | 2008 SD_{280} | — | September 26, 2008 | Kitt Peak | Spacewatch | EMA | 2.2 km | MPC · JPL |
| 760190 | 2008 SY_{281} | — | September 24, 2008 | Mount Lemmon | Mount Lemmon Survey | · | 2.3 km | MPC · JPL |
| 760191 | 2008 SO_{283} | — | September 22, 2008 | Kitt Peak | Spacewatch | EOS | 1.4 km | MPC · JPL |
| 760192 | 2008 SO_{289} | — | September 26, 2008 | Kitt Peak | Spacewatch | · | 1.6 km | MPC · JPL |
| 760193 | 2008 SR_{298} | — | September 21, 2008 | Kitt Peak | Spacewatch | · | 2.2 km | MPC · JPL |
| 760194 | 2008 SP_{314} | — | September 24, 2008 | Mount Lemmon | Mount Lemmon Survey | T_{j} (2.98) · 3:2 | 3.8 km | MPC · JPL |
| 760195 | 2008 SU_{316} | — | September 23, 2008 | Kitt Peak | Spacewatch | 3:2 | 3.7 km | MPC · JPL |
| 760196 | 2008 SZ_{316} | — | March 13, 2011 | Mount Lemmon | Mount Lemmon Survey | · | 2.6 km | MPC · JPL |
| 760197 | 2008 SF_{318} | — | September 30, 2008 | Catalina | CSS | · | 1.6 km | MPC · JPL |
| 760198 | 2008 SV_{318} | — | September 25, 1995 | Kitt Peak | Spacewatch | · | 1.2 km | MPC · JPL |
| 760199 | 2008 SW_{318} | — | September 24, 2008 | Kitt Peak | Spacewatch | · | 2.1 km | MPC · JPL |
| 760200 | 2008 SK_{319} | — | July 14, 2013 | Haleakala | Pan-STARRS 1 | EOS | 1.3 km | MPC · JPL |

== 760201–760300 ==
back to top

| Designation | | | Discovery | | | Properties | | Ref |
| Permanent | Provisional | Named after | Date | Site | Discoverer(s) | Category | Diam. | Ref |
|---|---|---|---|---|---|---|---|---|
| 760201 | 2008 SQ_{319} | — | February 9, 2015 | Mount Lemmon | Mount Lemmon Survey | · | 1.4 km | MPC · JPL |
| 760202 | 2008 ST_{319} | — | September 23, 2008 | Kitt Peak | Spacewatch | · | 2.1 km | MPC · JPL |
| 760203 | 2008 SU_{319} | — | September 23, 2008 | Kitt Peak | Spacewatch | ERI | 1.1 km | MPC · JPL |
| 760204 | 2008 SE_{320} | — | September 21, 2008 | Kitt Peak | Spacewatch | · | 1.0 km | MPC · JPL |
| 760205 | 2008 SD_{322} | — | September 23, 2008 | Kitt Peak | Spacewatch | · | 2.2 km | MPC · JPL |
| 760206 | 2008 SM_{326} | — | September 24, 2008 | Kitt Peak | Spacewatch | · | 1.7 km | MPC · JPL |
| 760207 | 2008 SQ_{326} | — | September 23, 2008 | Mount Lemmon | Mount Lemmon Survey | HYG | 2.2 km | MPC · JPL |
| 760208 | 2008 SV_{326} | — | September 23, 2008 | Mount Lemmon | Mount Lemmon Survey | · | 1.0 km | MPC · JPL |
| 760209 | 2008 SX_{326} | — | February 21, 2017 | Haleakala | Pan-STARRS 1 | · | 2.1 km | MPC · JPL |
| 760210 | 2008 SA_{327} | — | July 14, 2013 | Haleakala | Pan-STARRS 1 | · | 2.1 km | MPC · JPL |
| 760211 | 2008 SO_{328} | — | September 24, 2008 | Kitt Peak | Spacewatch | · | 1.2 km | MPC · JPL |
| 760212 | 2008 SD_{329} | — | December 20, 2014 | Kitt Peak | Spacewatch | · | 2.0 km | MPC · JPL |
| 760213 | 2008 SV_{329} | — | September 25, 2008 | Kitt Peak | Spacewatch | · | 1.7 km | MPC · JPL |
| 760214 | 2008 SR_{330} | — | June 26, 2015 | Haleakala | Pan-STARRS 1 | · | 750 m | MPC · JPL |
| 760215 | 2008 SQ_{332} | — | February 5, 2011 | Mount Lemmon | Mount Lemmon Survey | EOS | 1.6 km | MPC · JPL |
| 760216 | 2008 SY_{333} | — | August 10, 2013 | Kitt Peak | Spacewatch | · | 1.3 km | MPC · JPL |
| 760217 | 2008 SA_{335} | — | September 23, 2008 | Mount Lemmon | Mount Lemmon Survey | · | 1.8 km | MPC · JPL |
| 760218 | 2008 SJ_{335} | — | September 1, 2013 | Haleakala | Pan-STARRS 1 | · | 1.2 km | MPC · JPL |
| 760219 | 2008 SL_{336} | — | August 12, 2013 | Haleakala | Pan-STARRS 1 | · | 1.4 km | MPC · JPL |
| 760220 | 2008 ST_{336} | — | September 27, 2008 | Mount Lemmon | Mount Lemmon Survey | · | 1.7 km | MPC · JPL |
| 760221 | 2008 SY_{336} | — | December 16, 2009 | Mount Lemmon | Mount Lemmon Survey | · | 1.3 km | MPC · JPL |
| 760222 | 2008 SB_{337} | — | September 23, 2008 | Kitt Peak | Spacewatch | · | 1.6 km | MPC · JPL |
| 760223 | 2008 SP_{338} | — | September 30, 2008 | Mount Lemmon | Mount Lemmon Survey | H | 400 m | MPC · JPL |
| 760224 | 2008 SY_{338} | — | September 24, 2008 | Mount Lemmon | Mount Lemmon Survey | · | 1.8 km | MPC · JPL |
| 760225 | 2008 SA_{339} | — | September 22, 2008 | Kitt Peak | Spacewatch | · | 1.4 km | MPC · JPL |
| 760226 | 2008 SQ_{340} | — | September 25, 2008 | Mount Lemmon | Mount Lemmon Survey | · | 1.9 km | MPC · JPL |
| 760227 | 2008 SU_{340} | — | September 28, 2008 | Mount Lemmon | Mount Lemmon Survey | KOR | 1.0 km | MPC · JPL |
| 760228 | 2008 SD_{341} | — | September 26, 2008 | Kitt Peak | Spacewatch | EOS | 1.4 km | MPC · JPL |
| 760229 | 2008 SF_{341} | — | September 22, 2008 | Kitt Peak | Spacewatch | EOS | 1.4 km | MPC · JPL |
| 760230 | 2008 SK_{341} | — | September 24, 2008 | Mount Lemmon | Mount Lemmon Survey | · | 2.6 km | MPC · JPL |
| 760231 | 2008 SM_{341} | — | September 29, 2008 | Mount Lemmon | Mount Lemmon Survey | · | 2.5 km | MPC · JPL |
| 760232 | 2008 SN_{341} | — | September 29, 2008 | Mount Lemmon | Mount Lemmon Survey | · | 2.3 km | MPC · JPL |
| 760233 | 2008 SB_{342} | — | September 27, 2008 | Mount Lemmon | Mount Lemmon Survey | · | 1.8 km | MPC · JPL |
| 760234 | 2008 SN_{342} | — | September 29, 2008 | Mount Lemmon | Mount Lemmon Survey | · | 940 m | MPC · JPL |
| 760235 | 2008 SV_{342} | — | September 29, 2008 | Mount Lemmon | Mount Lemmon Survey | EOS | 1.2 km | MPC · JPL |
| 760236 | 2008 SX_{342} | — | September 19, 2008 | Kitt Peak | Spacewatch | · | 1.3 km | MPC · JPL |
| 760237 | 2008 SR_{343} | — | September 29, 2008 | Kitt Peak | Spacewatch | EOS | 1.4 km | MPC · JPL |
| 760238 | 2008 SO_{344} | — | September 24, 2008 | Mount Lemmon | Mount Lemmon Survey | L4 | 6.4 km | MPC · JPL |
| 760239 | 2008 SK_{346} | — | September 28, 2008 | Mount Lemmon | Mount Lemmon Survey | · | 2.0 km | MPC · JPL |
| 760240 | 2008 SP_{346} | — | September 28, 2008 | Mount Lemmon | Mount Lemmon Survey | L4 | 6.2 km | MPC · JPL |
| 760241 | 2008 SJ_{348} | — | September 23, 2008 | Mount Lemmon | Mount Lemmon Survey | EOS | 1.4 km | MPC · JPL |
| 760242 | 2008 SO_{348} | — | September 24, 2008 | Mount Lemmon | Mount Lemmon Survey | KOR | 1.0 km | MPC · JPL |
| 760243 | 2008 SQ_{348} | — | September 24, 2008 | Kitt Peak | Spacewatch | · | 1.2 km | MPC · JPL |
| 760244 | 2008 SE_{349} | — | September 26, 2008 | Kitt Peak | Spacewatch | · | 1.4 km | MPC · JPL |
| 760245 | 2008 SO_{358} | — | September 29, 2008 | Mount Lemmon | Mount Lemmon Survey | · | 1.1 km | MPC · JPL |
| 760246 | 2008 SF_{359} | — | September 24, 2008 | Kitt Peak | Spacewatch | · | 920 m | MPC · JPL |
| 760247 | 2008 SQ_{360} | — | September 23, 2008 | Kitt Peak | Spacewatch | · | 1.2 km | MPC · JPL |
| 760248 | 2008 SU_{362} | — | September 25, 2008 | Mount Lemmon | Mount Lemmon Survey | · | 1.0 km | MPC · JPL |
| 760249 | 2008 TS_{14} | — | September 9, 2008 | Bergisch Gladbach | W. Bickel | · | 1.2 km | MPC · JPL |
| 760250 | 2008 TU_{15} | — | August 24, 2008 | Kitt Peak | Spacewatch | · | 1.3 km | MPC · JPL |
| 760251 | 2008 TC_{25} | — | October 2, 2008 | Mount Lemmon | Mount Lemmon Survey | · | 2.7 km | MPC · JPL |
| 760252 | 2008 TO_{25} | — | October 2, 2008 | Mount Lemmon | Mount Lemmon Survey | 3:2 | 4.1 km | MPC · JPL |
| 760253 | 2008 TE_{27} | — | October 7, 2008 | Kitt Peak | Spacewatch | · | 1.3 km | MPC · JPL |
| 760254 | 2008 TS_{41} | — | October 1, 2008 | Mount Lemmon | Mount Lemmon Survey | · | 2.4 km | MPC · JPL |
| 760255 | 2008 TF_{47} | — | October 1, 2008 | Kitt Peak | Spacewatch | · | 1.9 km | MPC · JPL |
| 760256 | 2008 TQ_{50} | — | November 30, 2003 | Needville | Dillon, W. G., Garossino, P. | · | 1.8 km | MPC · JPL |
| 760257 | 2008 TG_{53} | — | September 24, 2008 | Kitt Peak | Spacewatch | · | 1.4 km | MPC · JPL |
| 760258 | 2008 TK_{54} | — | September 9, 2008 | Mount Lemmon | Mount Lemmon Survey | · | 1.6 km | MPC · JPL |
| 760259 | 2008 TT_{54} | — | September 9, 2008 | Mount Lemmon | Mount Lemmon Survey | · | 1.6 km | MPC · JPL |
| 760260 | 2008 TD_{55} | — | December 1, 2003 | Kitt Peak | Spacewatch | · | 1.3 km | MPC · JPL |
| 760261 | 2008 TG_{58} | — | September 20, 2008 | Kitt Peak | Spacewatch | · | 1.4 km | MPC · JPL |
| 760262 | 2008 TX_{62} | — | September 6, 2008 | Mount Lemmon | Mount Lemmon Survey | · | 1.5 km | MPC · JPL |
| 760263 | 2008 TR_{66} | — | September 23, 2008 | Kitt Peak | Spacewatch | · | 2.3 km | MPC · JPL |
| 760264 | 2008 TS_{66} | — | October 2, 2008 | Kitt Peak | Spacewatch | MAS | 490 m | MPC · JPL |
| 760265 | 2008 TK_{71} | — | October 2, 2008 | Kitt Peak | Spacewatch | · | 2.2 km | MPC · JPL |
| 760266 | 2008 TP_{73} | — | October 2, 2008 | Kitt Peak | Spacewatch | · | 1.3 km | MPC · JPL |
| 760267 | 2008 TM_{77} | — | October 2, 2008 | Mount Lemmon | Mount Lemmon Survey | · | 1.4 km | MPC · JPL |
| 760268 | 2008 TL_{80} | — | September 20, 2008 | Kitt Peak | Spacewatch | · | 1.7 km | MPC · JPL |
| 760269 | 2008 TZ_{86} | — | October 3, 2008 | Kitt Peak | Spacewatch | · | 1.2 km | MPC · JPL |
| 760270 | 2008 TA_{87} | — | September 25, 2008 | Kitt Peak | Spacewatch | · | 1.8 km | MPC · JPL |
| 760271 | 2008 TY_{88} | — | October 3, 2008 | Kitt Peak | Spacewatch | · | 1.5 km | MPC · JPL |
| 760272 | 2008 TQ_{96} | — | September 5, 2008 | Kitt Peak | Spacewatch | · | 1.9 km | MPC · JPL |
| 760273 | 2008 TC_{98} | — | September 5, 2008 | Kitt Peak | Spacewatch | · | 1.3 km | MPC · JPL |
| 760274 | 2008 TF_{108} | — | October 6, 2008 | Mount Lemmon | Mount Lemmon Survey | AGN | 840 m | MPC · JPL |
| 760275 | 2008 TD_{109} | — | September 23, 2008 | Mount Lemmon | Mount Lemmon Survey | · | 1.0 km | MPC · JPL |
| 760276 | 2008 TS_{113} | — | October 6, 2008 | Kitt Peak | Spacewatch | · | 2.0 km | MPC · JPL |
| 760277 | 2008 TS_{116} | — | September 23, 2008 | Catalina | CSS | · | 1.5 km | MPC · JPL |
| 760278 | 2008 TY_{128} | — | October 8, 2008 | Mount Lemmon | Mount Lemmon Survey | · | 1.4 km | MPC · JPL |
| 760279 | 2008 TJ_{136} | — | October 8, 2008 | Kitt Peak | Spacewatch | · | 1.7 km | MPC · JPL |
| 760280 | 2008 TY_{141} | — | September 24, 2008 | Kitt Peak | Spacewatch | · | 1.0 km | MPC · JPL |
| 760281 | 2008 TZ_{141} | — | October 2, 2008 | Mount Lemmon | Mount Lemmon Survey | · | 760 m | MPC · JPL |
| 760282 | 2008 TT_{145} | — | September 23, 2008 | Mount Lemmon | Mount Lemmon Survey | V | 500 m | MPC · JPL |
| 760283 | 2008 TF_{152} | — | November 19, 2003 | Kitt Peak | Spacewatch | · | 1.3 km | MPC · JPL |
| 760284 | 2008 TF_{154} | — | October 9, 2008 | Mount Lemmon | Mount Lemmon Survey | EOS | 1.6 km | MPC · JPL |
| 760285 | 2008 TY_{155} | — | October 9, 2008 | Mount Lemmon | Mount Lemmon Survey | · | 1.7 km | MPC · JPL |
| 760286 | 2008 TB_{160} | — | October 1, 2008 | Kitt Peak | Spacewatch | · | 1.5 km | MPC · JPL |
| 760287 | 2008 TU_{166} | — | October 8, 2008 | Kitt Peak | Spacewatch | · | 830 m | MPC · JPL |
| 760288 | 2008 TK_{170} | — | October 9, 2008 | Kitt Peak | Spacewatch | · | 1.2 km | MPC · JPL |
| 760289 | 2008 TH_{174} | — | October 2, 2008 | Kitt Peak | Spacewatch | EMA | 2.0 km | MPC · JPL |
| 760290 | 2008 TA_{176} | — | October 10, 2008 | Kitt Peak | Spacewatch | · | 1.7 km | MPC · JPL |
| 760291 | 2008 TF_{176} | — | October 3, 2008 | Mount Lemmon | Mount Lemmon Survey | · | 1.8 km | MPC · JPL |
| 760292 | 2008 TO_{184} | — | October 6, 2008 | Kitt Peak | Spacewatch | L4 | 6.1 km | MPC · JPL |
| 760293 | 2008 TJ_{192} | — | September 28, 2008 | Mount Lemmon | Mount Lemmon Survey | 3:2 | 3.8 km | MPC · JPL |
| 760294 | 2008 TP_{192} | — | October 1, 2008 | Kitt Peak | Spacewatch | · | 2.2 km | MPC · JPL |
| 760295 | 2008 TC_{198} | — | October 8, 2008 | Mount Lemmon | Mount Lemmon Survey | · | 1.8 km | MPC · JPL |
| 760296 | 2008 TQ_{198} | — | October 26, 2014 | Mount Lemmon | Mount Lemmon Survey | · | 2.1 km | MPC · JPL |
| 760297 | 2008 TV_{198} | — | October 8, 2008 | Mount Lemmon | Mount Lemmon Survey | · | 2.6 km | MPC · JPL |
| 760298 | 2008 TX_{199} | — | January 22, 2015 | Haleakala | Pan-STARRS 1 | · | 1.2 km | MPC · JPL |
| 760299 | 2008 TD_{204} | — | November 26, 2014 | Haleakala | Pan-STARRS 1 | · | 1.8 km | MPC · JPL |
| 760300 | 2008 TN_{205} | — | October 6, 2008 | Mount Lemmon | Mount Lemmon Survey | · | 940 m | MPC · JPL |

== 760301–760400 ==
back to top

| Designation | | | Discovery | | | Properties | | Ref |
| Permanent | Provisional | Named after | Date | Site | Discoverer(s) | Category | Diam. | Ref |
|---|---|---|---|---|---|---|---|---|
| 760301 | 2008 TE_{206} | — | October 9, 2008 | Kitt Peak | Spacewatch | · | 1.4 km | MPC · JPL |
| 760302 | 2008 TT_{206} | — | October 1, 2008 | Mount Lemmon | Mount Lemmon Survey | · | 1.5 km | MPC · JPL |
| 760303 | 2008 TC_{207} | — | October 8, 2008 | Kitt Peak | Spacewatch | KOR | 1.0 km | MPC · JPL |
| 760304 | 2008 TS_{207} | — | September 6, 2008 | Kitt Peak | Spacewatch | · | 1.2 km | MPC · JPL |
| 760305 | 2008 TV_{207} | — | March 17, 2015 | Haleakala | Pan-STARRS 1 | · | 1.2 km | MPC · JPL |
| 760306 | 2008 TZ_{208} | — | February 10, 2016 | Haleakala | Pan-STARRS 1 | EOS | 1.4 km | MPC · JPL |
| 760307 | 2008 TK_{209} | — | April 1, 2016 | Mount Lemmon | Mount Lemmon Survey | · | 1.5 km | MPC · JPL |
| 760308 | 2008 TE_{210} | — | October 1, 2008 | Mount Lemmon | Mount Lemmon Survey | · | 1.7 km | MPC · JPL |
| 760309 | 2008 TL_{212} | — | November 8, 2009 | Mount Lemmon | Mount Lemmon Survey | L4 | 6.4 km | MPC · JPL |
| 760310 | 2008 TH_{213} | — | November 27, 2014 | Haleakala | Pan-STARRS 1 | · | 1.9 km | MPC · JPL |
| 760311 | 2008 TO_{213} | — | October 9, 2008 | Mount Lemmon | Mount Lemmon Survey | · | 2.2 km | MPC · JPL |
| 760312 | 2008 TQ_{214} | — | January 12, 2010 | Kitt Peak | Spacewatch | · | 1.7 km | MPC · JPL |
| 760313 | 2008 TC_{215} | — | November 21, 2014 | Haleakala | Pan-STARRS 1 | · | 1.7 km | MPC · JPL |
| 760314 | 2008 TH_{215} | — | October 22, 2012 | Haleakala | Pan-STARRS 1 | V | 520 m | MPC · JPL |
| 760315 | 2008 TR_{216} | — | October 6, 2008 | Mount Lemmon | Mount Lemmon Survey | EOS | 1.3 km | MPC · JPL |
| 760316 | 2008 TV_{216} | — | October 9, 2008 | Kitt Peak | Spacewatch | · | 1.9 km | MPC · JPL |
| 760317 | 2008 TO_{218} | — | October 7, 2008 | Kitt Peak | Spacewatch | · | 1.7 km | MPC · JPL |
| 760318 | 2008 TU_{218} | — | October 1, 2008 | Mount Lemmon | Mount Lemmon Survey | EOS | 1.4 km | MPC · JPL |
| 760319 | 2008 TH_{219} | — | October 8, 2008 | Mount Lemmon | Mount Lemmon Survey | EOS | 1.4 km | MPC · JPL |
| 760320 | 2008 TJ_{219} | — | October 6, 2008 | Kitt Peak | Spacewatch | KOR | 1.1 km | MPC · JPL |
| 760321 | 2008 TN_{219} | — | October 1, 2008 | Kitt Peak | Spacewatch | EOS | 1.3 km | MPC · JPL |
| 760322 | 2008 TP_{219} | — | October 6, 2008 | Mount Lemmon | Mount Lemmon Survey | · | 1.7 km | MPC · JPL |
| 760323 | 2008 TT_{221} | — | October 6, 2008 | Mount Lemmon | Mount Lemmon Survey | · | 1.7 km | MPC · JPL |
| 760324 | 2008 TM_{222} | — | October 8, 2008 | Kitt Peak | Spacewatch | · | 1.3 km | MPC · JPL |
| 760325 | 2008 TE_{223} | — | October 9, 2008 | Mount Lemmon | Mount Lemmon Survey | · | 1.8 km | MPC · JPL |
| 760326 | 2008 TT_{223} | — | September 23, 2008 | Mount Lemmon | Mount Lemmon Survey | · | 1.7 km | MPC · JPL |
| 760327 | 2008 TU_{223} | — | October 3, 2008 | Kitt Peak | Spacewatch | · | 1.6 km | MPC · JPL |
| 760328 | 2008 TW_{223} | — | April 25, 2007 | Kitt Peak | Spacewatch | · | 980 m | MPC · JPL |
| 760329 | 2008 TP_{225} | — | October 1, 2008 | Mount Lemmon | Mount Lemmon Survey | L4 | 6.1 km | MPC · JPL |
| 760330 | 2008 TT_{225} | — | October 10, 2008 | Mount Lemmon | Mount Lemmon Survey | · | 1.6 km | MPC · JPL |
| 760331 | 2008 TK_{226} | — | October 8, 2008 | Mount Lemmon | Mount Lemmon Survey | EOS | 1.4 km | MPC · JPL |
| 760332 | 2008 TU_{226} | — | October 9, 2008 | Mount Lemmon | Mount Lemmon Survey | · | 1.7 km | MPC · JPL |
| 760333 | 2008 TK_{229} | — | October 8, 2008 | Kitt Peak | Spacewatch | · | 1.7 km | MPC · JPL |
| 760334 | 2008 TJ_{231} | — | October 6, 2008 | Kitt Peak | Spacewatch | · | 1.7 km | MPC · JPL |
| 760335 | 2008 TZ_{235} | — | October 10, 2008 | Mount Lemmon | Mount Lemmon Survey | L4 | 6.5 km | MPC · JPL |
| 760336 | 2008 TK_{237} | — | October 1, 2008 | Mount Lemmon | Mount Lemmon Survey | 3:2 | 3.7 km | MPC · JPL |
| 760337 | 2008 TW_{239} | — | October 8, 2008 | Mount Lemmon | Mount Lemmon Survey | · | 1.3 km | MPC · JPL |
| 760338 | 2008 TZ_{239} | — | October 2, 2008 | Kitt Peak | Spacewatch | · | 1.3 km | MPC · JPL |
| 760339 | 2008 TF_{240} | — | October 6, 2008 | Mount Lemmon | Mount Lemmon Survey | · | 1.5 km | MPC · JPL |
| 760340 | 2008 TN_{241} | — | October 8, 2008 | Mount Lemmon | Mount Lemmon Survey | · | 1.6 km | MPC · JPL |
| 760341 | 2008 UC_{9} | — | October 25, 2003 | Kitt Peak | Spacewatch | · | 1.2 km | MPC · JPL |
| 760342 | 2008 UC_{19} | — | October 6, 2008 | Kitt Peak | Spacewatch | · | 1.8 km | MPC · JPL |
| 760343 | 2008 UH_{29} | — | October 20, 2008 | Kitt Peak | Spacewatch | · | 2.0 km | MPC · JPL |
| 760344 | 2008 UG_{31} | — | October 20, 2008 | Kitt Peak | Spacewatch | EMA | 1.9 km | MPC · JPL |
| 760345 | 2008 UU_{33} | — | September 24, 2008 | Kitt Peak | Spacewatch | · | 440 m | MPC · JPL |
| 760346 | 2008 UX_{33} | — | January 28, 2006 | Kitt Peak | Spacewatch | NYS | 870 m | MPC · JPL |
| 760347 | 2008 UC_{43} | — | October 8, 2008 | Kitt Peak | Spacewatch | · | 1.0 km | MPC · JPL |
| 760348 | 2008 US_{70} | — | October 1, 2008 | Kitt Peak | Spacewatch | · | 480 m | MPC · JPL |
| 760349 | 2008 UX_{72} | — | October 21, 2008 | Kitt Peak | Spacewatch | · | 2.2 km | MPC · JPL |
| 760350 | 2008 UY_{82} | — | October 8, 2008 | Kitt Peak | Spacewatch | (5) | 900 m | MPC · JPL |
| 760351 | 2008 UL_{83} | — | October 22, 2008 | Mount Lemmon | Mount Lemmon Survey | · | 1.7 km | MPC · JPL |
| 760352 | 2008 UT_{84} | — | October 1, 2008 | Mount Lemmon | Mount Lemmon Survey | EOS | 1.1 km | MPC · JPL |
| 760353 | 2008 UD_{102} | — | October 20, 2008 | Kitt Peak | Spacewatch | · | 1.3 km | MPC · JPL |
| 760354 | 2008 UZ_{103} | — | September 22, 2008 | Mount Lemmon | Mount Lemmon Survey | T_{j} (2.97) · 3:2 | 3.1 km | MPC · JPL |
| 760355 | 2008 US_{106} | — | September 7, 2008 | Mount Lemmon | Mount Lemmon Survey | · | 1.9 km | MPC · JPL |
| 760356 | 2008 UA_{108} | — | October 21, 2008 | Mount Lemmon | Mount Lemmon Survey | · | 2.3 km | MPC · JPL |
| 760357 | 2008 UU_{118} | — | October 22, 2008 | Kitt Peak | Spacewatch | · | 1.9 km | MPC · JPL |
| 760358 | 2008 UG_{122} | — | October 22, 2008 | Kitt Peak | Spacewatch | · | 1.3 km | MPC · JPL |
| 760359 | 2008 UU_{130} | — | October 23, 2008 | Kitt Peak | Spacewatch | · | 2.6 km | MPC · JPL |
| 760360 | 2008 UO_{135} | — | October 1, 2008 | Mount Lemmon | Mount Lemmon Survey | · | 1.7 km | MPC · JPL |
| 760361 | 2008 UH_{136} | — | October 1, 2008 | Mount Lemmon | Mount Lemmon Survey | · | 1.8 km | MPC · JPL |
| 760362 | 2008 UM_{136} | — | October 23, 2008 | Kitt Peak | Spacewatch | · | 1.9 km | MPC · JPL |
| 760363 | 2008 UU_{136} | — | October 23, 2008 | Kitt Peak | Spacewatch | · | 1.4 km | MPC · JPL |
| 760364 | 2008 UN_{138} | — | September 7, 2008 | Mount Lemmon | Mount Lemmon Survey | · | 2.3 km | MPC · JPL |
| 760365 | 2008 UO_{139} | — | October 23, 2008 | Kitt Peak | Spacewatch | · | 1.6 km | MPC · JPL |
| 760366 | 2008 UV_{139} | — | October 23, 2008 | Kitt Peak | Spacewatch | EOS | 1.4 km | MPC · JPL |
| 760367 | 2008 UW_{144} | — | October 23, 2008 | Kitt Peak | Spacewatch | · | 1.4 km | MPC · JPL |
| 760368 | 2008 UQ_{153} | — | October 23, 2008 | Mount Lemmon | Mount Lemmon Survey | · | 1.7 km | MPC · JPL |
| 760369 | 2008 UO_{163} | — | October 24, 2008 | Kitt Peak | Spacewatch | EOS | 1.4 km | MPC · JPL |
| 760370 | 2008 UE_{164} | — | October 24, 2008 | Kitt Peak | Spacewatch | H | 360 m | MPC · JPL |
| 760371 | 2008 UX_{171} | — | October 22, 2008 | Kitt Peak | Spacewatch | · | 1.6 km | MPC · JPL |
| 760372 | 2008 UH_{178} | — | October 24, 2008 | Mount Lemmon | Mount Lemmon Survey | VER | 2.1 km | MPC · JPL |
| 760373 | 2008 UX_{181} | — | October 24, 2008 | Mount Lemmon | Mount Lemmon Survey | · | 1.6 km | MPC · JPL |
| 760374 | 2008 UA_{182} | — | September 23, 2008 | Kitt Peak | Spacewatch | · | 2.0 km | MPC · JPL |
| 760375 | 2008 UH_{190} | — | September 28, 2008 | Mount Lemmon | Mount Lemmon Survey | · | 2.0 km | MPC · JPL |
| 760376 | 2008 UM_{194} | — | October 7, 2008 | Mount Lemmon | Mount Lemmon Survey | · | 2.0 km | MPC · JPL |
| 760377 | 2008 UM_{196} | — | September 29, 2008 | Kitt Peak | Spacewatch | · | 1.6 km | MPC · JPL |
| 760378 | 2008 UD_{197} | — | October 27, 2008 | Mount Lemmon | Mount Lemmon Survey | · | 1.6 km | MPC · JPL |
| 760379 | 2008 UQ_{197} | — | October 27, 2008 | Kitt Peak | Spacewatch | · | 1.2 km | MPC · JPL |
| 760380 | 2008 UT_{197} | — | October 27, 2008 | Mount Lemmon | Mount Lemmon Survey | EOS | 1.5 km | MPC · JPL |
| 760381 | 2008 UQ_{199} | — | October 7, 2008 | Kitt Peak | Spacewatch | · | 1.4 km | MPC · JPL |
| 760382 | 2008 UR_{216} | — | September 22, 2008 | Kitt Peak | Spacewatch | T_{j} (2.94) · 3:2 | 3.1 km | MPC · JPL |
| 760383 | 2008 UZ_{220} | — | October 25, 2008 | Kitt Peak | Spacewatch | HNS | 820 m | MPC · JPL |
| 760384 | 2008 UA_{232} | — | October 26, 2008 | Mount Lemmon | Mount Lemmon Survey | · | 1.9 km | MPC · JPL |
| 760385 | 2008 UF_{233} | — | September 24, 2008 | Mount Lemmon | Mount Lemmon Survey | · | 1.8 km | MPC · JPL |
| 760386 | 2008 US_{236} | — | October 26, 2008 | Kitt Peak | Spacewatch | H | 360 m | MPC · JPL |
| 760387 | 2008 UF_{237} | — | October 26, 2008 | Kitt Peak | Spacewatch | EOS | 1.5 km | MPC · JPL |
| 760388 | 2008 UN_{238} | — | October 26, 2008 | Kitt Peak | Spacewatch | EOS | 1.2 km | MPC · JPL |
| 760389 | 2008 UQ_{247} | — | October 26, 2008 | Kitt Peak | Spacewatch | T_{j} (2.99) · 3:2 · SHU | 4.1 km | MPC · JPL |
| 760390 | 2008 UX_{249} | — | October 27, 2008 | Kitt Peak | Spacewatch | EOS | 1.5 km | MPC · JPL |
| 760391 | 2008 UL_{265} | — | October 9, 2008 | Kitt Peak | Spacewatch | · | 2.2 km | MPC · JPL |
| 760392 | 2008 UY_{270} | — | October 8, 2008 | Mount Lemmon | Mount Lemmon Survey | · | 2.1 km | MPC · JPL |
| 760393 | 2008 UA_{271} | — | October 20, 2008 | Mount Lemmon | Mount Lemmon Survey | · | 2.1 km | MPC · JPL |
| 760394 | 2008 US_{273} | — | October 20, 2008 | Kitt Peak | Spacewatch | · | 1.6 km | MPC · JPL |
| 760395 | 2008 UO_{282} | — | October 29, 2000 | Kitt Peak | Spacewatch | 3:2 | 3.7 km | MPC · JPL |
| 760396 | 2008 UB_{285} | — | September 25, 2008 | Kitt Peak | Spacewatch | · | 1.7 km | MPC · JPL |
| 760397 | 2008 UZ_{285} | — | October 1, 2008 | Kitt Peak | Spacewatch | (5) | 760 m | MPC · JPL |
| 760398 | 2008 UN_{288} | — | October 8, 2008 | Kitt Peak | Spacewatch | · | 1.9 km | MPC · JPL |
| 760399 | 2008 UV_{288} | — | October 1, 2008 | Kitt Peak | Spacewatch | · | 1.8 km | MPC · JPL |
| 760400 | 2008 UH_{293} | — | October 29, 2008 | Kitt Peak | Spacewatch | EOS | 1.3 km | MPC · JPL |

== 760401–760500 ==
back to top

| Designation | | | Discovery | | | Properties | | Ref |
| Permanent | Provisional | Named after | Date | Site | Discoverer(s) | Category | Diam. | Ref |
|---|---|---|---|---|---|---|---|---|
| 760401 | 2008 UO_{293} | — | October 29, 2008 | Kitt Peak | Spacewatch | · | 2.0 km | MPC · JPL |
| 760402 | 2008 UQ_{293} | — | October 21, 2008 | Kitt Peak | Spacewatch | · | 2.1 km | MPC · JPL |
| 760403 | 2008 UP_{294} | — | September 22, 2008 | Mount Lemmon | Mount Lemmon Survey | · | 2.0 km | MPC · JPL |
| 760404 | 2008 UA_{295} | — | October 2, 2008 | Kitt Peak | Spacewatch | EOS | 1.4 km | MPC · JPL |
| 760405 | 2008 UC_{295} | — | October 29, 2008 | Kitt Peak | Spacewatch | · | 2.2 km | MPC · JPL |
| 760406 | 2008 UG_{297} | — | September 23, 2008 | Kitt Peak | Spacewatch | · | 1.5 km | MPC · JPL |
| 760407 | 2008 UW_{304} | — | October 29, 2008 | Mount Lemmon | Mount Lemmon Survey | · | 2.0 km | MPC · JPL |
| 760408 | 2008 UH_{305} | — | October 8, 2008 | Mount Lemmon | Mount Lemmon Survey | · | 1.6 km | MPC · JPL |
| 760409 | 2008 UB_{306} | — | October 30, 2008 | Kitt Peak | Spacewatch | EOS | 1.3 km | MPC · JPL |
| 760410 | 2008 UF_{307} | — | October 30, 2008 | Kitt Peak | Spacewatch | · | 2.0 km | MPC · JPL |
| 760411 | 2008 UL_{315} | — | December 3, 2005 | Kitt Peak | Spacewatch | · | 510 m | MPC · JPL |
| 760412 | 2008 UC_{316} | — | October 30, 2008 | Kitt Peak | Spacewatch | EOS | 1.4 km | MPC · JPL |
| 760413 | 2008 UZ_{317} | — | September 24, 2008 | Kitt Peak | Spacewatch | · | 1.2 km | MPC · JPL |
| 760414 | 2008 UB_{320} | — | October 31, 2008 | Mount Lemmon | Mount Lemmon Survey | · | 1.3 km | MPC · JPL |
| 760415 | 2008 UX_{321} | — | October 8, 2008 | Mount Lemmon | Mount Lemmon Survey | · | 1.5 km | MPC · JPL |
| 760416 | 2008 UL_{326} | — | October 31, 2008 | Mount Lemmon | Mount Lemmon Survey | · | 2.3 km | MPC · JPL |
| 760417 | 2008 UJ_{328} | — | October 13, 2004 | Kitt Peak | Spacewatch | · | 960 m | MPC · JPL |
| 760418 | 2008 UX_{334} | — | October 20, 2008 | Kitt Peak | Spacewatch | · | 1.3 km | MPC · JPL |
| 760419 | 2008 UM_{344} | — | October 30, 2008 | Kitt Peak | Spacewatch | · | 2.0 km | MPC · JPL |
| 760420 | 2008 UJ_{348} | — | September 22, 2008 | Kitt Peak | Spacewatch | EOS | 1.2 km | MPC · JPL |
| 760421 | 2008 UB_{349} | — | October 27, 2008 | Kitt Peak | Spacewatch | · | 1.6 km | MPC · JPL |
| 760422 | 2008 UZ_{349} | — | September 22, 2008 | Mount Lemmon | Mount Lemmon Survey | · | 2.1 km | MPC · JPL |
| 760423 | 2008 UA_{350} | — | October 10, 2008 | Mount Lemmon | Mount Lemmon Survey | · | 2.0 km | MPC · JPL |
| 760424 | 2008 UD_{357} | — | October 24, 2008 | Kitt Peak | Spacewatch | · | 1.5 km | MPC · JPL |
| 760425 | 2008 UL_{364} | — | October 28, 2008 | Catalina | CSS | · | 2.8 km | MPC · JPL |
| 760426 | 2008 UO_{366} | — | October 20, 2008 | Mount Lemmon | Mount Lemmon Survey | · | 2.7 km | MPC · JPL |
| 760427 | 2008 UC_{369} | — | October 26, 2008 | Mount Lemmon | Mount Lemmon Survey | · | 1.9 km | MPC · JPL |
| 760428 | 2008 UT_{372} | — | October 3, 2013 | Mount Lemmon | Mount Lemmon Survey | EOS | 1.4 km | MPC · JPL |
| 760429 | 2008 UG_{375} | — | October 28, 2008 | Kitt Peak | Spacewatch | EOS | 1.4 km | MPC · JPL |
| 760430 | 2008 UH_{381} | — | October 23, 2008 | Mount Lemmon | Mount Lemmon Survey | JUN | 820 m | MPC · JPL |
| 760431 | 2008 UE_{382} | — | January 20, 2015 | Mount Lemmon | Mount Lemmon Survey | EOS | 1.3 km | MPC · JPL |
| 760432 | 2008 UF_{382} | — | August 15, 2013 | Haleakala | Pan-STARRS 1 | · | 1.8 km | MPC · JPL |
| 760433 | 2008 US_{382} | — | October 27, 2008 | Kitt Peak | Spacewatch | · | 1.1 km | MPC · JPL |
| 760434 | 2008 US_{388} | — | November 22, 2014 | Mount Lemmon | Mount Lemmon Survey | · | 2.4 km | MPC · JPL |
| 760435 | 2008 UD_{389} | — | October 3, 2008 | Kitt Peak | Spacewatch | · | 1.9 km | MPC · JPL |
| 760436 | 2008 UG_{389} | — | August 9, 2013 | Kitt Peak | Spacewatch | · | 1.5 km | MPC · JPL |
| 760437 | 2008 UO_{389} | — | July 14, 2013 | Haleakala | Pan-STARRS 1 | · | 2.6 km | MPC · JPL |
| 760438 | 2008 UC_{390} | — | October 23, 2008 | Kitt Peak | Spacewatch | THM | 1.7 km | MPC · JPL |
| 760439 | 2008 UF_{390} | — | February 10, 2016 | Haleakala | Pan-STARRS 1 | EOS | 1.5 km | MPC · JPL |
| 760440 | 2008 UM_{390} | — | October 26, 2008 | Pla D'Arguines | R. Ferrando, Ferrando, M. | · | 2.6 km | MPC · JPL |
| 760441 | 2008 UQ_{390} | — | October 25, 2008 | Kitt Peak | Spacewatch | · | 2.5 km | MPC · JPL |
| 760442 | 2008 UR_{390} | — | October 23, 2008 | Kitt Peak | Spacewatch | · | 2.0 km | MPC · JPL |
| 760443 | 2008 UY_{390} | — | October 27, 2008 | Mount Lemmon | Mount Lemmon Survey | · | 1.8 km | MPC · JPL |
| 760444 | 2008 UA_{392} | — | October 30, 2008 | Kitt Peak | Spacewatch | · | 2.6 km | MPC · JPL |
| 760445 | 2008 UK_{393} | — | May 16, 2012 | Haleakala | Pan-STARRS 1 | · | 1.4 km | MPC · JPL |
| 760446 | 2008 UL_{393} | — | October 9, 2013 | Mount Lemmon | Mount Lemmon Survey | · | 2.2 km | MPC · JPL |
| 760447 | 2008 UM_{393} | — | August 11, 2018 | Haleakala | Pan-STARRS 1 | · | 2.2 km | MPC · JPL |
| 760448 | 2008 UQ_{393} | — | October 23, 2008 | Kitt Peak | Spacewatch | · | 1.7 km | MPC · JPL |
| 760449 | 2008 UT_{393} | — | October 27, 2008 | Mount Lemmon | Mount Lemmon Survey | · | 1.2 km | MPC · JPL |
| 760450 | 2008 UX_{393} | — | October 26, 2008 | Kitt Peak | Spacewatch | · | 1.6 km | MPC · JPL |
| 760451 | 2008 UF_{394} | — | October 15, 2013 | Mount Lemmon | Mount Lemmon Survey | · | 1.2 km | MPC · JPL |
| 760452 | 2008 UT_{394} | — | April 1, 2017 | Haleakala | Pan-STARRS 1 | EOS | 1.3 km | MPC · JPL |
| 760453 | 2008 UF_{395} | — | October 27, 2008 | Kitt Peak | Spacewatch | · | 2.3 km | MPC · JPL |
| 760454 | 2008 UX_{395} | — | November 19, 2014 | Mount Lemmon | Mount Lemmon Survey | · | 2.3 km | MPC · JPL |
| 760455 | 2008 UB_{396} | — | October 20, 2008 | Mount Lemmon | Mount Lemmon Survey | · | 1.2 km | MPC · JPL |
| 760456 | 2008 UF_{396} | — | October 26, 2008 | Mount Lemmon | Mount Lemmon Survey | · | 1.1 km | MPC · JPL |
| 760457 | 2008 UP_{396} | — | January 26, 2014 | Haleakala | Pan-STARRS 1 | · | 1.4 km | MPC · JPL |
| 760458 | 2008 UX_{396} | — | March 17, 2015 | Mount Lemmon | Mount Lemmon Survey | · | 1.2 km | MPC · JPL |
| 760459 | 2008 UM_{397} | — | July 10, 2018 | Haleakala | Pan-STARRS 1 | · | 1.6 km | MPC · JPL |
| 760460 | 2008 UF_{398} | — | October 22, 2008 | Kitt Peak | Spacewatch | · | 2.7 km | MPC · JPL |
| 760461 | 2008 UK_{398} | — | October 23, 2008 | Mount Lemmon | Mount Lemmon Survey | · | 1.6 km | MPC · JPL |
| 760462 | 2008 UY_{398} | — | March 12, 2016 | Haleakala | Pan-STARRS 1 | EOS | 1.4 km | MPC · JPL |
| 760463 | 2008 UY_{399} | — | October 21, 2008 | Kitt Peak | Spacewatch | EOS | 1.4 km | MPC · JPL |
| 760464 | 2008 UA_{400} | — | November 21, 2014 | Mount Lemmon | Mount Lemmon Survey | · | 2.0 km | MPC · JPL |
| 760465 | 2008 UF_{400} | — | October 27, 2008 | Mount Lemmon | Mount Lemmon Survey | · | 2.1 km | MPC · JPL |
| 760466 | 2008 UR_{400} | — | October 27, 2008 | Kitt Peak | Spacewatch | MIS | 1.6 km | MPC · JPL |
| 760467 | 2008 US_{400} | — | September 3, 2013 | Mount Lemmon | Mount Lemmon Survey | · | 1.7 km | MPC · JPL |
| 760468 | 2008 UX_{400} | — | October 31, 2008 | Kitt Peak | Spacewatch | · | 1.4 km | MPC · JPL |
| 760469 | 2008 UA_{401} | — | November 26, 2014 | Haleakala | Pan-STARRS 1 | · | 1.8 km | MPC · JPL |
| 760470 | 2008 UJ_{401} | — | December 29, 2014 | Haleakala | Pan-STARRS 1 | · | 1.4 km | MPC · JPL |
| 760471 | 2008 UK_{401} | — | October 26, 2008 | Kitt Peak | Spacewatch | · | 1.8 km | MPC · JPL |
| 760472 | 2008 UV_{401} | — | October 29, 2008 | Kitt Peak | Spacewatch | · | 2.5 km | MPC · JPL |
| 760473 | 2008 UX_{402} | — | October 26, 2008 | Kitt Peak | Spacewatch | EOS | 1.6 km | MPC · JPL |
| 760474 | 2008 UE_{404} | — | October 25, 2008 | Mount Lemmon | Mount Lemmon Survey | · | 1.9 km | MPC · JPL |
| 760475 | 2008 UK_{405} | — | October 22, 2008 | Kitt Peak | Spacewatch | · | 1.3 km | MPC · JPL |
| 760476 | 2008 UG_{406} | — | October 29, 2008 | Kitt Peak | Spacewatch | EOS | 1.4 km | MPC · JPL |
| 760477 | 2008 UQ_{406} | — | October 26, 2008 | Mount Lemmon | Mount Lemmon Survey | · | 1.8 km | MPC · JPL |
| 760478 | 2008 UK_{407} | — | October 23, 2008 | Kitt Peak | Spacewatch | (260) | 2.7 km | MPC · JPL |
| 760479 | 2008 UQ_{407} | — | October 28, 2008 | Mount Lemmon | Mount Lemmon Survey | · | 1.2 km | MPC · JPL |
| 760480 | 2008 UT_{407} | — | October 22, 2008 | Kitt Peak | Spacewatch | · | 1.9 km | MPC · JPL |
| 760481 | 2008 UG_{409} | — | October 26, 2008 | Mount Lemmon | Mount Lemmon Survey | L4 | 6.0 km | MPC · JPL |
| 760482 | 2008 UQ_{409} | — | October 26, 2008 | Kitt Peak | Spacewatch | · | 2.3 km | MPC · JPL |
| 760483 | 2008 UT_{411} | — | October 30, 2008 | Kitt Peak | Spacewatch | · | 2.2 km | MPC · JPL |
| 760484 | 2008 UE_{412} | — | October 26, 2008 | Kitt Peak | Spacewatch | · | 1.2 km | MPC · JPL |
| 760485 | 2008 UQ_{412} | — | October 20, 2008 | Mount Lemmon | Mount Lemmon Survey | · | 1.6 km | MPC · JPL |
| 760486 | 2008 UR_{412} | — | October 29, 2008 | Kitt Peak | Spacewatch | EOS | 1.3 km | MPC · JPL |
| 760487 | 2008 UV_{417} | — | October 28, 2008 | Mount Lemmon | Mount Lemmon Survey | EOS | 1.4 km | MPC · JPL |
| 760488 | 2008 UA_{421} | — | October 24, 2008 | Kitt Peak | Spacewatch | · | 1.4 km | MPC · JPL |
| 760489 | 2008 UM_{421} | — | October 29, 2008 | Kitt Peak | Spacewatch | PHO | 840 m | MPC · JPL |
| 760490 | 2008 UN_{421} | — | October 28, 2008 | Mount Lemmon | Mount Lemmon Survey | EOS | 1.5 km | MPC · JPL |
| 760491 | 2008 UY_{421} | — | October 21, 2008 | Kitt Peak | Spacewatch | · | 1.1 km | MPC · JPL |
| 760492 | 2008 UP_{423} | — | October 28, 2008 | Mount Lemmon | Mount Lemmon Survey | · | 1.8 km | MPC · JPL |
| 760493 | 2008 UA_{426} | — | October 27, 2008 | Kitt Peak | Spacewatch | · | 1.1 km | MPC · JPL |
| 760494 | 2008 VC_{10} | — | November 2, 2008 | Kitt Peak | Spacewatch | · | 1.4 km | MPC · JPL |
| 760495 | 2008 VW_{21} | — | November 1, 2008 | Mount Lemmon | Mount Lemmon Survey | EOS | 1.4 km | MPC · JPL |
| 760496 | 2008 VB_{24} | — | November 1, 2008 | Kitt Peak | Spacewatch | THB | 2.9 km | MPC · JPL |
| 760497 | 2008 VV_{28} | — | September 28, 2008 | Mount Lemmon | Mount Lemmon Survey | EMA | 2.4 km | MPC · JPL |
| 760498 | 2008 VU_{29} | — | November 2, 2008 | Kitt Peak | Spacewatch | · | 1.9 km | MPC · JPL |
| 760499 | 2008 VW_{37} | — | November 2, 2008 | Mount Lemmon | Mount Lemmon Survey | · | 1.8 km | MPC · JPL |
| 760500 | 2008 VE_{52} | — | October 7, 2008 | Kitt Peak | Spacewatch | · | 1.7 km | MPC · JPL |

== 760501–760600 ==
back to top

| Designation | | | Discovery | | | Properties | | Ref |
| Permanent | Provisional | Named after | Date | Site | Discoverer(s) | Category | Diam. | Ref |
|---|---|---|---|---|---|---|---|---|
| 760501 | 2008 VP_{54} | — | November 6, 2008 | Mount Lemmon | Mount Lemmon Survey | · | 1.5 km | MPC · JPL |
| 760502 | 2008 VK_{55} | — | November 6, 2008 | Mount Lemmon | Mount Lemmon Survey | · | 2.0 km | MPC · JPL |
| 760503 | 2008 VX_{55} | — | September 29, 2008 | Mount Lemmon | Mount Lemmon Survey | EOS | 1.3 km | MPC · JPL |
| 760504 | 2008 VM_{61} | — | November 8, 2008 | Mount Lemmon | Mount Lemmon Survey | EOS | 1.4 km | MPC · JPL |
| 760505 | 2008 VJ_{63} | — | November 8, 2008 | Kitt Peak | Spacewatch | · | 460 m | MPC · JPL |
| 760506 | 2008 VH_{69} | — | November 7, 2008 | Mount Lemmon | Mount Lemmon Survey | · | 1.9 km | MPC · JPL |
| 760507 | 2008 VZ_{70} | — | November 8, 2008 | Kitt Peak | Spacewatch | EOS | 1.3 km | MPC · JPL |
| 760508 | 2008 VA_{81} | — | January 21, 2015 | Haleakala | Pan-STARRS 1 | · | 1.2 km | MPC · JPL |
| 760509 | 2008 VR_{81} | — | July 24, 2015 | Haleakala | Pan-STARRS 1 | T_{j} (2.95) · 3:2 | 4.1 km | MPC · JPL |
| 760510 | 2008 VD_{82} | — | November 7, 2008 | Mount Lemmon | Mount Lemmon Survey | · | 1.4 km | MPC · JPL |
| 760511 | 2008 VT_{83} | — | June 15, 2012 | Haleakala | Pan-STARRS 1 | · | 2.6 km | MPC · JPL |
| 760512 | 2008 VO_{85} | — | November 7, 2008 | Mount Lemmon | Mount Lemmon Survey | NYS | 880 m | MPC · JPL |
| 760513 | 2008 VW_{86} | — | November 1, 2008 | Mount Lemmon | Mount Lemmon Survey | · | 1.5 km | MPC · JPL |
| 760514 | 2008 VP_{87} | — | October 13, 2013 | Kitt Peak | Spacewatch | · | 1.6 km | MPC · JPL |
| 760515 | 2008 VX_{87} | — | November 8, 2008 | Kitt Peak | Spacewatch | · | 2.4 km | MPC · JPL |
| 760516 | 2008 VD_{88} | — | October 31, 2008 | Kitt Peak | Spacewatch | · | 2.7 km | MPC · JPL |
| 760517 | 2008 VG_{91} | — | September 3, 2013 | Haleakala | Pan-STARRS 1 | · | 2.0 km | MPC · JPL |
| 760518 | 2008 VV_{91} | — | March 30, 2015 | Haleakala | Pan-STARRS 1 | · | 950 m | MPC · JPL |
| 760519 | 2008 VA_{92} | — | October 24, 2008 | Mount Lemmon | Mount Lemmon Survey | (5) | 880 m | MPC · JPL |
| 760520 | 2008 VL_{95} | — | November 8, 2008 | Kitt Peak | Spacewatch | · | 1.0 km | MPC · JPL |
| 760521 | 2008 VU_{95} | — | January 7, 2016 | Haleakala | Pan-STARRS 1 | · | 2.4 km | MPC · JPL |
| 760522 | 2008 VV_{95} | — | January 21, 2015 | Haleakala | Pan-STARRS 1 | · | 1.9 km | MPC · JPL |
| 760523 | 2008 VW_{95} | — | April 20, 2017 | Haleakala | Pan-STARRS 1 | · | 2.0 km | MPC · JPL |
| 760524 | 2008 VY_{95} | — | April 3, 2016 | Haleakala | Pan-STARRS 1 | EOS | 1.4 km | MPC · JPL |
| 760525 | 2008 VG_{97} | — | October 15, 2013 | Mount Lemmon | Mount Lemmon Survey | AEG | 1.9 km | MPC · JPL |
| 760526 | 2008 VR_{97} | — | December 21, 2014 | Haleakala | Pan-STARRS 1 | EOS | 1.6 km | MPC · JPL |
| 760527 | 2008 VN_{99} | — | November 2, 2008 | Mount Lemmon | Mount Lemmon Survey | EOS | 1.3 km | MPC · JPL |
| 760528 | 2008 VU_{99} | — | November 3, 2008 | Mount Lemmon | Mount Lemmon Survey | TEL | 970 m | MPC · JPL |
| 760529 | 2008 VE_{100} | — | November 2, 2008 | Mount Lemmon | Mount Lemmon Survey | · | 1.6 km | MPC · JPL |
| 760530 | 2008 VO_{100} | — | November 8, 2008 | Mount Lemmon | Mount Lemmon Survey | THM | 1.6 km | MPC · JPL |
| 760531 | 2008 VL_{103} | — | November 1, 2008 | Mount Lemmon | Mount Lemmon Survey | · | 1.0 km | MPC · JPL |
| 760532 | 2008 VO_{103} | — | November 7, 2008 | Mount Lemmon | Mount Lemmon Survey | · | 2.7 km | MPC · JPL |
| 760533 | 2008 VV_{104} | — | November 1, 2008 | Mount Lemmon | Mount Lemmon Survey | EOS | 1.3 km | MPC · JPL |
| 760534 | 2008 VP_{105} | — | November 2, 2008 | Kitt Peak | Spacewatch | EOS | 1.3 km | MPC · JPL |
| 760535 | 2008 VA_{106} | — | November 8, 2008 | Mount Lemmon | Mount Lemmon Survey | T_{j} (2.99) · 3:2 | 4.6 km | MPC · JPL |
| 760536 | 2008 VS_{106} | — | November 1, 2008 | Mount Lemmon | Mount Lemmon Survey | EOS | 1.6 km | MPC · JPL |
| 760537 | 2008 VR_{107} | — | November 2, 2008 | Kitt Peak | Spacewatch | · | 2.5 km | MPC · JPL |
| 760538 | 2008 VM_{108} | — | November 6, 2008 | Mount Lemmon | Mount Lemmon Survey | EOS | 1.4 km | MPC · JPL |
| 760539 | 2008 VS_{108} | — | November 1, 2008 | Mount Lemmon | Mount Lemmon Survey | · | 1.6 km | MPC · JPL |
| 760540 | 2008 VL_{109} | — | November 1, 2008 | Mount Lemmon | Mount Lemmon Survey | · | 2.2 km | MPC · JPL |
| 760541 | 2008 VM_{109} | — | November 1, 2008 | Mount Lemmon | Mount Lemmon Survey | · | 530 m | MPC · JPL |
| 760542 | 2008 VB_{111} | — | November 7, 2008 | Mount Lemmon | Mount Lemmon Survey | · | 1.8 km | MPC · JPL |
| 760543 | 2008 WL_{3} | — | October 2, 2008 | Kitt Peak | Spacewatch | EOS | 1.4 km | MPC · JPL |
| 760544 | 2008 WS_{6} | — | October 30, 2008 | Kitt Peak | Spacewatch | · | 970 m | MPC · JPL |
| 760545 | 2008 WQ_{7} | — | October 24, 2008 | Kitt Peak | Spacewatch | EOS | 1.6 km | MPC · JPL |
| 760546 | 2008 WF_{9} | — | October 28, 2008 | Kitt Peak | Spacewatch | · | 1.6 km | MPC · JPL |
| 760547 | 2008 WX_{12} | — | November 19, 2008 | Bisei | BATTeRS | ADE | 1.5 km | MPC · JPL |
| 760548 | 2008 WN_{14} | — | November 7, 2008 | Mount Lemmon | Mount Lemmon Survey | · | 1.9 km | MPC · JPL |
| 760549 | 2008 WM_{17} | — | November 2, 2008 | Kitt Peak | Spacewatch | · | 930 m | MPC · JPL |
| 760550 | 2008 WV_{17} | — | September 23, 2008 | Mount Lemmon | Mount Lemmon Survey | EOS | 1.4 km | MPC · JPL |
| 760551 | 2008 WK_{19} | — | November 17, 2008 | Kitt Peak | Spacewatch | EOS | 1.5 km | MPC · JPL |
| 760552 | 2008 WM_{19} | — | November 17, 2008 | Kitt Peak | Spacewatch | EOS | 1.4 km | MPC · JPL |
| 760553 | 2008 WF_{27} | — | October 27, 2008 | Kitt Peak | Spacewatch | · | 1.2 km | MPC · JPL |
| 760554 | 2008 WN_{30} | — | November 19, 2008 | Mount Lemmon | Mount Lemmon Survey | · | 1.8 km | MPC · JPL |
| 760555 | 2008 WD_{35} | — | November 17, 2008 | Kitt Peak | Spacewatch | · | 1.5 km | MPC · JPL |
| 760556 | 2008 WU_{37} | — | October 24, 2008 | Kitt Peak | Spacewatch | · | 2.2 km | MPC · JPL |
| 760557 | 2008 WZ_{38} | — | November 17, 2008 | Kitt Peak | Spacewatch | · | 2.3 km | MPC · JPL |
| 760558 | 2008 WW_{42} | — | November 17, 2008 | Kitt Peak | Spacewatch | · | 2.3 km | MPC · JPL |
| 760559 | 2008 WP_{48} | — | September 22, 2008 | Mount Lemmon | Mount Lemmon Survey | · | 1.5 km | MPC · JPL |
| 760560 | 2008 WK_{50} | — | November 7, 2008 | Mount Lemmon | Mount Lemmon Survey | H | 540 m | MPC · JPL |
| 760561 | 2008 WV_{50} | — | October 23, 2008 | Kitt Peak | Spacewatch | EOS | 1.2 km | MPC · JPL |
| 760562 | 2008 WU_{51} | — | November 19, 2008 | Kitt Peak | Spacewatch | EOS | 1.5 km | MPC · JPL |
| 760563 | 2008 WQ_{57} | — | October 23, 2008 | Mount Lemmon | Mount Lemmon Survey | EOS | 1.4 km | MPC · JPL |
| 760564 | 2008 WR_{74} | — | October 29, 2008 | Kitt Peak | Spacewatch | · | 650 m | MPC · JPL |
| 760565 | 2008 WV_{74} | — | October 2, 2008 | Kitt Peak | Spacewatch | · | 1.2 km | MPC · JPL |
| 760566 | 2008 WB_{78} | — | November 7, 2008 | Mount Lemmon | Mount Lemmon Survey | EOS | 1.5 km | MPC · JPL |
| 760567 | 2008 WH_{89} | — | November 21, 2008 | Mount Lemmon | Mount Lemmon Survey | · | 2.0 km | MPC · JPL |
| 760568 | 2008 WL_{90} | — | November 22, 2008 | Kitt Peak | Spacewatch | · | 1.2 km | MPC · JPL |
| 760569 | 2008 WG_{91} | — | October 8, 2008 | Kitt Peak | Spacewatch | · | 1.5 km | MPC · JPL |
| 760570 | 2008 WP_{100} | — | November 24, 2008 | Kitt Peak | Spacewatch | · | 2.1 km | MPC · JPL |
| 760571 | 2008 WK_{106} | — | November 8, 2008 | Kitt Peak | Spacewatch | · | 2.3 km | MPC · JPL |
| 760572 | 2008 WR_{110} | — | November 30, 2008 | Kitt Peak | Spacewatch | · | 1.6 km | MPC · JPL |
| 760573 | 2008 WE_{115} | — | November 8, 2008 | Kitt Peak | Spacewatch | · | 2.0 km | MPC · JPL |
| 760574 | 2008 WB_{120} | — | November 17, 2008 | Kitt Peak | Spacewatch | · | 740 m | MPC · JPL |
| 760575 | 2008 WW_{127} | — | November 21, 2008 | Kitt Peak | Spacewatch | · | 2.1 km | MPC · JPL |
| 760576 | 2008 WJ_{128} | — | November 19, 2008 | Kitt Peak | Spacewatch | · | 1.4 km | MPC · JPL |
| 760577 | 2008 WU_{129} | — | November 18, 2008 | Kitt Peak | Spacewatch | · | 1.6 km | MPC · JPL |
| 760578 | 2008 WD_{131} | — | November 19, 2008 | Kitt Peak | Spacewatch | · | 2.0 km | MPC · JPL |
| 760579 | 2008 WM_{145} | — | November 24, 2008 | Mount Lemmon | Mount Lemmon Survey | · | 590 m | MPC · JPL |
| 760580 | 2008 WG_{147} | — | November 19, 2008 | Kitt Peak | Spacewatch | · | 1.9 km | MPC · JPL |
| 760581 | 2008 WM_{147} | — | November 21, 2008 | Mount Lemmon | Mount Lemmon Survey | · | 1.1 km | MPC · JPL |
| 760582 | 2008 WU_{149} | — | November 20, 2008 | Mount Lemmon | Mount Lemmon Survey | · | 2.3 km | MPC · JPL |
| 760583 | 2008 WS_{150} | — | March 5, 2000 | Cerro Tololo | Deep Lens Survey | · | 2.2 km | MPC · JPL |
| 760584 | 2008 WJ_{151} | — | October 26, 2008 | Kitt Peak | Spacewatch | · | 2.1 km | MPC · JPL |
| 760585 | 2008 WK_{151} | — | December 31, 2016 | Haleakala | Pan-STARRS 1 | H | 390 m | MPC · JPL |
| 760586 | 2008 WA_{152} | — | September 25, 2013 | Mount Lemmon | Mount Lemmon Survey | · | 1.7 km | MPC · JPL |
| 760587 | 2008 WB_{152} | — | November 19, 2008 | Mount Lemmon | Mount Lemmon Survey | · | 2.0 km | MPC · JPL |
| 760588 | 2008 WE_{152} | — | May 21, 2015 | Haleakala | Pan-STARRS 1 | · | 1.1 km | MPC · JPL |
| 760589 | 2008 WS_{152} | — | November 2, 2011 | Kitt Peak | Spacewatch | · | 480 m | MPC · JPL |
| 760590 | 2008 WV_{152} | — | January 17, 2016 | Haleakala | Pan-STARRS 1 | VER | 2.1 km | MPC · JPL |
| 760591 | 2008 WC_{154} | — | November 19, 2008 | Mount Lemmon | Mount Lemmon Survey | THM | 1.6 km | MPC · JPL |
| 760592 | 2008 WW_{154} | — | October 13, 2013 | Kitt Peak | Spacewatch | · | 1.3 km | MPC · JPL |
| 760593 | 2008 WZ_{154} | — | November 21, 2008 | Mount Lemmon | Mount Lemmon Survey | · | 2.9 km | MPC · JPL |
| 760594 | 2008 WH_{155} | — | November 21, 2008 | Kitt Peak | Spacewatch | · | 1.5 km | MPC · JPL |
| 760595 | 2008 WJ_{155} | — | April 27, 2017 | Haleakala | Pan-STARRS 1 | · | 2.1 km | MPC · JPL |
| 760596 | 2008 WU_{155} | — | November 9, 2013 | Mount Lemmon | Mount Lemmon Survey | EOS | 1.4 km | MPC · JPL |
| 760597 | 2008 WZ_{156} | — | November 20, 2008 | Kitt Peak | Spacewatch | · | 1.7 km | MPC · JPL |
| 760598 | 2008 WE_{157} | — | November 19, 2008 | Kitt Peak | Spacewatch | · | 1.8 km | MPC · JPL |
| 760599 | 2008 WM_{157} | — | November 30, 2008 | Mount Lemmon | Mount Lemmon Survey | · | 1.3 km | MPC · JPL |
| 760600 | 2008 WR_{158} | — | November 24, 2008 | Mount Lemmon | Mount Lemmon Survey | · | 420 m | MPC · JPL |

== 760601–760700 ==
back to top

| Designation | | | Discovery | | | Properties | | Ref |
| Permanent | Provisional | Named after | Date | Site | Discoverer(s) | Category | Diam. | Ref |
|---|---|---|---|---|---|---|---|---|
| 760601 | 2008 WT_{158} | — | November 18, 2008 | Kitt Peak | Spacewatch | · | 900 m | MPC · JPL |
| 760602 | 2008 WK_{160} | — | November 21, 2008 | Kitt Peak | Spacewatch | THM | 1.5 km | MPC · JPL |
| 760603 | 2008 WR_{161} | — | November 21, 2008 | Mount Lemmon | Mount Lemmon Survey | TIR | 2.0 km | MPC · JPL |
| 760604 | 2008 WD_{164} | — | November 20, 2008 | Kitt Peak | Spacewatch | · | 2.4 km | MPC · JPL |
| 760605 | 2008 WA_{165} | — | November 21, 2008 | Kitt Peak | Spacewatch | EOS | 1.2 km | MPC · JPL |
| 760606 | 2008 WQ_{165} | — | November 30, 2008 | Mount Lemmon | Mount Lemmon Survey | HYG | 2.3 km | MPC · JPL |
| 760607 | 2008 WQ_{167} | — | April 27, 2017 | Haleakala | Pan-STARRS 1 | · | 1.6 km | MPC · JPL |
| 760608 | 2008 WV_{167} | — | November 30, 2008 | Kitt Peak | Spacewatch | · | 2.5 km | MPC · JPL |
| 760609 | 2008 WZ_{167} | — | November 20, 2008 | Mount Lemmon | Mount Lemmon Survey | EOS | 1.4 km | MPC · JPL |
| 760610 | 2008 XE_{8} | — | December 1, 2008 | Kitt Peak | Spacewatch | EOS | 1.6 km | MPC · JPL |
| 760611 | 2008 XB_{10} | — | December 2, 2008 | Mount Lemmon | Mount Lemmon Survey | · | 2.0 km | MPC · JPL |
| 760612 | 2008 XU_{10} | — | December 1, 2008 | Catalina | CSS | · | 2.0 km | MPC · JPL |
| 760613 | 2008 XJ_{11} | — | December 1, 2008 | Mount Lemmon | Mount Lemmon Survey | EOS | 1.4 km | MPC · JPL |
| 760614 | 2008 XM_{12} | — | December 2, 2008 | Mount Lemmon | Mount Lemmon Survey | H | 450 m | MPC · JPL |
| 760615 | 2008 XB_{25} | — | October 31, 2008 | Kitt Peak | Spacewatch | · | 1.3 km | MPC · JPL |
| 760616 | 2008 XC_{33} | — | December 2, 2008 | Kitt Peak | Spacewatch | · | 780 m | MPC · JPL |
| 760617 | 2008 XS_{33} | — | December 2, 2008 | Kitt Peak | Spacewatch | · | 2.0 km | MPC · JPL |
| 760618 | 2008 XW_{34} | — | November 19, 2008 | Kitt Peak | Spacewatch | · | 1.7 km | MPC · JPL |
| 760619 | 2008 XB_{37} | — | December 2, 2008 | Kitt Peak | Spacewatch | · | 1.4 km | MPC · JPL |
| 760620 | 2008 XB_{43} | — | December 2, 2008 | Mount Lemmon | Mount Lemmon Survey | · | 2.7 km | MPC · JPL |
| 760621 | 2008 XM_{43} | — | December 2, 2008 | Kitt Peak | Spacewatch | · | 610 m | MPC · JPL |
| 760622 | 2008 XP_{45} | — | November 9, 2008 | Kitt Peak | Spacewatch | · | 2.1 km | MPC · JPL |
| 760623 | 2008 XO_{47} | — | December 3, 2008 | Kitt Peak | Spacewatch | · | 2.0 km | MPC · JPL |
| 760624 | 2008 XM_{51} | — | October 28, 2008 | Kitt Peak | Spacewatch | EOS | 1.5 km | MPC · JPL |
| 760625 | 2008 XD_{63} | — | October 31, 2008 | Kitt Peak | Spacewatch | · | 1.1 km | MPC · JPL |
| 760626 | 2008 XK_{63} | — | December 2, 2008 | Mount Lemmon | Mount Lemmon Survey | · | 2.4 km | MPC · JPL |
| 760627 | 2008 XP_{63} | — | December 2, 2008 | Kitt Peak | Spacewatch | · | 1.7 km | MPC · JPL |
| 760628 | 2008 XQ_{63} | — | November 6, 2013 | Haleakala | Pan-STARRS 1 | · | 1.8 km | MPC · JPL |
| 760629 | 2008 XB_{64} | — | September 24, 2013 | Mount Lemmon | Mount Lemmon Survey | · | 1.4 km | MPC · JPL |
| 760630 | 2008 XJ_{64} | — | October 5, 2013 | Haleakala | Pan-STARRS 1 | · | 1.8 km | MPC · JPL |
| 760631 | 2008 XK_{64} | — | August 20, 2015 | Kitt Peak | Spacewatch | · | 850 m | MPC · JPL |
| 760632 | 2008 XT_{64} | — | January 24, 2015 | Haleakala | Pan-STARRS 1 | · | 1.6 km | MPC · JPL |
| 760633 | 2008 XX_{64} | — | April 13, 2011 | Kitt Peak | Spacewatch | EOS | 1.8 km | MPC · JPL |
| 760634 | 2008 XH_{65} | — | December 2, 2008 | Kitt Peak | Spacewatch | · | 1.3 km | MPC · JPL |
| 760635 | 2008 XJ_{65} | — | January 26, 2015 | Haleakala | Pan-STARRS 1 | EOS | 1.5 km | MPC · JPL |
| 760636 | 2008 XL_{65} | — | December 2, 2008 | Kitt Peak | Spacewatch | EOS | 1.5 km | MPC · JPL |
| 760637 | 2008 XN_{65} | — | July 13, 2018 | Haleakala | Pan-STARRS 1 | VER | 2.0 km | MPC · JPL |
| 760638 | 2008 XA_{66} | — | December 4, 2008 | Kitt Peak | Spacewatch | EOS | 1.4 km | MPC · JPL |
| 760639 | 2008 XE_{66} | — | December 1, 2008 | Mount Lemmon | Mount Lemmon Survey | · | 2.4 km | MPC · JPL |
| 760640 | 2008 XT_{66} | — | December 1, 2008 | Kitt Peak | Spacewatch | · | 1.9 km | MPC · JPL |
| 760641 | 2008 XN_{67} | — | December 4, 2008 | Kitt Peak | Spacewatch | · | 1.7 km | MPC · JPL |
| 760642 | 2008 XV_{67} | — | December 4, 2008 | Kitt Peak | Spacewatch | · | 1.1 km | MPC · JPL |
| 760643 | 2008 XD_{68} | — | December 3, 2008 | Mount Lemmon | Mount Lemmon Survey | · | 1.8 km | MPC · JPL |
| 760644 | 2008 XH_{68} | — | December 1, 2008 | Kitt Peak | Spacewatch | EOS | 1.4 km | MPC · JPL |
| 760645 | 2008 XJ_{69} | — | December 3, 2008 | Kitt Peak | Spacewatch | · | 1.5 km | MPC · JPL |
| 760646 | 2008 YU_{1} | — | December 21, 2008 | Catalina | CSS | · | 1.1 km | MPC · JPL |
| 760647 | 2008 YO_{16} | — | December 21, 2008 | Mount Lemmon | Mount Lemmon Survey | · | 2.1 km | MPC · JPL |
| 760648 | 2008 YP_{45} | — | December 29, 2008 | Mount Lemmon | Mount Lemmon Survey | · | 1.6 km | MPC · JPL |
| 760649 | 2008 YQ_{47} | — | November 20, 2008 | Mount Lemmon | Mount Lemmon Survey | TIR | 2.4 km | MPC · JPL |
| 760650 | 2008 YN_{48} | — | December 29, 2008 | Mount Lemmon | Mount Lemmon Survey | THM | 1.7 km | MPC · JPL |
| 760651 | 2008 YM_{52} | — | December 29, 2008 | Mount Lemmon | Mount Lemmon Survey | · | 1.5 km | MPC · JPL |
| 760652 | 2008 YP_{55} | — | December 29, 2008 | Kitt Peak | Spacewatch | · | 2.1 km | MPC · JPL |
| 760653 | 2008 YS_{56} | — | December 22, 2008 | Kitt Peak | Spacewatch | · | 2.3 km | MPC · JPL |
| 760654 | 2008 YA_{58} | — | December 30, 2008 | Kitt Peak | Spacewatch | · | 2.2 km | MPC · JPL |
| 760655 | 2008 YL_{59} | — | December 22, 2008 | Kitt Peak | Spacewatch | THM | 2.0 km | MPC · JPL |
| 760656 | 2008 YM_{61} | — | December 30, 2008 | Mount Lemmon | Mount Lemmon Survey | · | 2.0 km | MPC · JPL |
| 760657 | 2008 YH_{64} | — | December 30, 2008 | Mount Lemmon | Mount Lemmon Survey | · | 2.0 km | MPC · JPL |
| 760658 | 2008 YZ_{64} | — | December 30, 2008 | Mount Lemmon | Mount Lemmon Survey | MAR | 710 m | MPC · JPL |
| 760659 | 2008 YP_{65} | — | December 30, 2008 | Kitt Peak | Spacewatch | · | 2.0 km | MPC · JPL |
| 760660 | 2008 YH_{67} | — | December 30, 2008 | Mount Lemmon | Mount Lemmon Survey | · | 1.9 km | MPC · JPL |
| 760661 | 2008 YQ_{70} | — | December 29, 2008 | Mount Lemmon | Mount Lemmon Survey | TIR | 2.0 km | MPC · JPL |
| 760662 | 2008 YN_{71} | — | April 24, 2006 | Kitt Peak | Spacewatch | · | 1.4 km | MPC · JPL |
| 760663 | 2008 YY_{72} | — | December 6, 2008 | Kitt Peak | Spacewatch | · | 1.2 km | MPC · JPL |
| 760664 | 2008 YK_{73} | — | December 30, 2008 | Kitt Peak | Spacewatch | · | 1.8 km | MPC · JPL |
| 760665 | 2008 YD_{78} | — | December 30, 2008 | Mount Lemmon | Mount Lemmon Survey | · | 1.2 km | MPC · JPL |
| 760666 | 2008 YW_{78} | — | December 22, 2008 | Mount Lemmon | Mount Lemmon Survey | · | 2.8 km | MPC · JPL |
| 760667 | 2008 YP_{79} | — | December 30, 2008 | Mount Lemmon | Mount Lemmon Survey | · | 2.2 km | MPC · JPL |
| 760668 | 2008 YC_{82} | — | October 20, 2007 | Mount Lemmon | Mount Lemmon Survey | · | 3.0 km | MPC · JPL |
| 760669 | 2008 YU_{82} | — | December 31, 2008 | Kitt Peak | Spacewatch | · | 2.3 km | MPC · JPL |
| 760670 | 2008 YL_{86} | — | December 29, 2008 | Kitt Peak | Spacewatch | (31811) | 2.3 km | MPC · JPL |
| 760671 | 2008 YY_{87} | — | December 29, 2008 | Kitt Peak | Spacewatch | · | 1.6 km | MPC · JPL |
| 760672 | 2008 YF_{89} | — | December 29, 2008 | Kitt Peak | Spacewatch | · | 390 m | MPC · JPL |
| 760673 | 2008 YJ_{89} | — | December 4, 2008 | Mount Lemmon | Mount Lemmon Survey | · | 2.2 km | MPC · JPL |
| 760674 | 2008 YQ_{102} | — | December 21, 2008 | Mount Lemmon | Mount Lemmon Survey | · | 2.4 km | MPC · JPL |
| 760675 | 2008 YH_{103} | — | December 29, 2008 | Kitt Peak | Spacewatch | · | 720 m | MPC · JPL |
| 760676 | 2008 YO_{112} | — | December 31, 2008 | Kitt Peak | Spacewatch | EOS | 1.6 km | MPC · JPL |
| 760677 | 2008 YU_{112} | — | December 31, 2008 | Kitt Peak | Spacewatch | · | 1.0 km | MPC · JPL |
| 760678 | 2008 YB_{113} | — | December 31, 2008 | Kitt Peak | Spacewatch | · | 2.0 km | MPC · JPL |
| 760679 | 2008 YF_{114} | — | December 29, 2008 | Kitt Peak | Spacewatch | · | 610 m | MPC · JPL |
| 760680 | 2008 YD_{116} | — | December 21, 2008 | Mount Lemmon | Mount Lemmon Survey | · | 2.6 km | MPC · JPL |
| 760681 | 2008 YQ_{116} | — | December 21, 2008 | Mount Lemmon | Mount Lemmon Survey | EOS | 1.4 km | MPC · JPL |
| 760682 | 2008 YZ_{120} | — | December 30, 2008 | Kitt Peak | Spacewatch | · | 2.2 km | MPC · JPL |
| 760683 | 2008 YC_{121} | — | December 30, 2008 | Kitt Peak | Spacewatch | · | 510 m | MPC · JPL |
| 760684 | 2008 YR_{132} | — | December 31, 2008 | Kitt Peak | Spacewatch | · | 1.6 km | MPC · JPL |
| 760685 | 2008 YK_{137} | — | September 11, 2007 | Mount Lemmon | Mount Lemmon Survey | · | 1.5 km | MPC · JPL |
| 760686 | 2008 YX_{137} | — | December 22, 2008 | Kitt Peak | Spacewatch | THM | 1.5 km | MPC · JPL |
| 760687 | 2008 YC_{139} | — | December 22, 2008 | Mount Lemmon | Mount Lemmon Survey | · | 2.6 km | MPC · JPL |
| 760688 | 2008 YY_{140} | — | December 30, 2008 | Mount Lemmon | Mount Lemmon Survey | · | 1.6 km | MPC · JPL |
| 760689 | 2008 YE_{142} | — | December 30, 2008 | Kitt Peak | Spacewatch | · | 1.9 km | MPC · JPL |
| 760690 | 2008 YF_{142} | — | December 30, 2008 | Kitt Peak | Spacewatch | · | 2.1 km | MPC · JPL |
| 760691 | 2008 YA_{145} | — | December 30, 2008 | Kitt Peak | Spacewatch | · | 1.2 km | MPC · JPL |
| 760692 | 2008 YP_{145} | — | December 30, 2008 | Kitt Peak | Spacewatch | · | 2.3 km | MPC · JPL |
| 760693 | 2008 YM_{151} | — | December 22, 2008 | Kitt Peak | Spacewatch | · | 1.8 km | MPC · JPL |
| 760694 | 2008 YV_{152} | — | December 30, 2008 | Kitt Peak | Spacewatch | · | 1.7 km | MPC · JPL |
| 760695 | 2008 YW_{153} | — | December 21, 2008 | Mount Lemmon | Mount Lemmon Survey | · | 1.4 km | MPC · JPL |
| 760696 | 2008 YV_{154} | — | December 22, 2008 | Mount Lemmon | Mount Lemmon Survey | · | 2.4 km | MPC · JPL |
| 760697 | 2008 YH_{155} | — | December 22, 2008 | Kitt Peak | Spacewatch | · | 2.5 km | MPC · JPL |
| 760698 | 2008 YN_{156} | — | December 30, 2008 | Mount Lemmon | Mount Lemmon Survey | TIR | 2.2 km | MPC · JPL |
| 760699 | 2008 YM_{164} | — | December 22, 2008 | Kitt Peak | Spacewatch | · | 2.0 km | MPC · JPL |
| 760700 | 2008 YG_{175} | — | October 9, 2007 | Mount Lemmon | Mount Lemmon Survey | HYG | 2.4 km | MPC · JPL |

== 760701–760800 ==
back to top

| Designation | | | Discovery | | | Properties | | Ref |
| Permanent | Provisional | Named after | Date | Site | Discoverer(s) | Category | Diam. | Ref |
|---|---|---|---|---|---|---|---|---|
| 760701 | 2008 YK_{180} | — | November 29, 2014 | Mount Lemmon | Mount Lemmon Survey | TIR | 2.6 km | MPC · JPL |
| 760702 | 2008 YU_{180} | — | December 22, 2008 | Kitt Peak | Spacewatch | · | 1.7 km | MPC · JPL |
| 760703 | 2008 YE_{182} | — | December 29, 2008 | Mount Lemmon | Mount Lemmon Survey | · | 2.2 km | MPC · JPL |
| 760704 | 2008 YJ_{183} | — | October 13, 2013 | Mount Lemmon | Mount Lemmon Survey | · | 1.9 km | MPC · JPL |
| 760705 | 2008 YO_{183} | — | December 3, 2008 | Mount Lemmon | Mount Lemmon Survey | · | 560 m | MPC · JPL |
| 760706 | 2008 YP_{183} | — | January 20, 2015 | Haleakala | Pan-STARRS 1 | · | 2.6 km | MPC · JPL |
| 760707 | 2008 YE_{184} | — | December 29, 2008 | Kitt Peak | Spacewatch | · | 1.4 km | MPC · JPL |
| 760708 | 2008 YN_{184} | — | December 23, 2012 | Haleakala | Pan-STARRS 1 | · | 990 m | MPC · JPL |
| 760709 | 2008 YQ_{184} | — | June 13, 2015 | Haleakala | Pan-STARRS 1 | · | 890 m | MPC · JPL |
| 760710 | 2008 YX_{184} | — | December 22, 2008 | Kitt Peak | Spacewatch | EOS | 1.4 km | MPC · JPL |
| 760711 | 2008 YL_{185} | — | June 18, 2010 | Mount Lemmon | Mount Lemmon Survey | EUN | 840 m | MPC · JPL |
| 760712 | 2008 YN_{185} | — | December 22, 2008 | Mount Lemmon | Mount Lemmon Survey | · | 1.1 km | MPC · JPL |
| 760713 | 2008 YU_{185} | — | December 21, 2008 | Kitt Peak | Spacewatch | · | 750 m | MPC · JPL |
| 760714 | 2008 YM_{186} | — | December 29, 2008 | Mount Lemmon | Mount Lemmon Survey | LIX | 2.6 km | MPC · JPL |
| 760715 | 2008 YN_{187} | — | December 29, 2008 | Mount Lemmon | Mount Lemmon Survey | · | 2.0 km | MPC · JPL |
| 760716 | 2008 YF_{188} | — | December 30, 2008 | Kitt Peak | Spacewatch | EOS | 1.4 km | MPC · JPL |
| 760717 | 2008 YJ_{188} | — | December 30, 2008 | Mount Lemmon | Mount Lemmon Survey | · | 2.0 km | MPC · JPL |
| 760718 | 2008 YO_{188} | — | December 30, 2008 | Kitt Peak | Spacewatch | · | 1.9 km | MPC · JPL |
| 760719 | 2008 YA_{189} | — | December 30, 2008 | Mount Lemmon | Mount Lemmon Survey | · | 1.9 km | MPC · JPL |
| 760720 | 2008 YO_{189} | — | December 22, 2008 | Kitt Peak | Spacewatch | · | 940 m | MPC · JPL |
| 760721 | 2008 YB_{190} | — | December 31, 2008 | Kitt Peak | Spacewatch | · | 2.4 km | MPC · JPL |
| 760722 | 2008 YO_{190} | — | December 31, 2008 | Kitt Peak | Spacewatch | · | 2.2 km | MPC · JPL |
| 760723 | 2008 YO_{191} | — | December 22, 2008 | Mount Lemmon | Mount Lemmon Survey | VER | 2.3 km | MPC · JPL |
| 760724 | 2008 YL_{193} | — | December 22, 2008 | Kitt Peak | Spacewatch | · | 1.4 km | MPC · JPL |
| 760725 | 2008 YM_{193} | — | December 31, 2008 | Mount Lemmon | Mount Lemmon Survey | · | 2.5 km | MPC · JPL |
| 760726 | 2008 YQ_{193} | — | December 22, 2008 | Kitt Peak | Spacewatch | · | 2.0 km | MPC · JPL |
| 760727 | 2008 YU_{193} | — | December 21, 2008 | Kitt Peak | Spacewatch | · | 2.7 km | MPC · JPL |
| 760728 | 2008 YJ_{194} | — | December 31, 2008 | Kitt Peak | Spacewatch | · | 2.3 km | MPC · JPL |
| 760729 | 2008 YD_{195} | — | December 31, 2008 | Kitt Peak | Spacewatch | · | 2.0 km | MPC · JPL |
| 760730 | 2008 YR_{195} | — | December 30, 2008 | Kitt Peak | Spacewatch | VER | 1.9 km | MPC · JPL |
| 760731 | 2008 YE_{196} | — | December 22, 2008 | Kitt Peak | Spacewatch | VER | 2.2 km | MPC · JPL |
| 760732 | 2008 YF_{197} | — | December 31, 2008 | Kitt Peak | Spacewatch | · | 2.4 km | MPC · JPL |
| 760733 | 2008 YP_{197} | — | December 21, 2008 | Kitt Peak | Spacewatch | (43176) | 2.4 km | MPC · JPL |
| 760734 | 2008 YH_{198} | — | December 21, 2008 | Kitt Peak | Spacewatch | · | 2.4 km | MPC · JPL |
| 760735 | 2009 AA_{10} | — | January 2, 2009 | Mount Lemmon | Mount Lemmon Survey | · | 1.9 km | MPC · JPL |
| 760736 | 2009 AS_{11} | — | December 22, 2008 | Kitt Peak | Spacewatch | · | 1.9 km | MPC · JPL |
| 760737 | 2009 AB_{18} | — | December 22, 2008 | Kitt Peak | Spacewatch | · | 1.4 km | MPC · JPL |
| 760738 | 2009 AB_{20} | — | January 2, 2009 | Mount Lemmon | Mount Lemmon Survey | EOS | 1.3 km | MPC · JPL |
| 760739 | 2009 AJ_{20} | — | December 22, 2008 | Kitt Peak | Spacewatch | · | 1.8 km | MPC · JPL |
| 760740 | 2009 AJ_{21} | — | November 24, 2008 | Kitt Peak | Spacewatch | · | 1.5 km | MPC · JPL |
| 760741 | 2009 AW_{21} | — | January 3, 2009 | Kitt Peak | Spacewatch | · | 860 m | MPC · JPL |
| 760742 | 2009 AK_{25} | — | January 2, 2009 | Kitt Peak | Spacewatch | VER | 2.4 km | MPC · JPL |
| 760743 | 2009 AU_{29} | — | November 24, 2008 | Mount Lemmon | Mount Lemmon Survey | · | 2.6 km | MPC · JPL |
| 760744 | 2009 AO_{34} | — | January 3, 2009 | Kitt Peak | Spacewatch | · | 790 m | MPC · JPL |
| 760745 | 2009 AE_{36} | — | January 15, 2009 | Kitt Peak | Spacewatch | · | 2.4 km | MPC · JPL |
| 760746 | 2009 AK_{38} | — | January 15, 2009 | Kitt Peak | Spacewatch | EOS | 1.5 km | MPC · JPL |
| 760747 | 2009 AU_{38} | — | January 15, 2009 | Kitt Peak | Spacewatch | · | 860 m | MPC · JPL |
| 760748 | 2009 AQ_{43} | — | September 21, 2003 | Kitt Peak | Spacewatch | · | 1.3 km | MPC · JPL |
| 760749 | 2009 AC_{46} | — | January 2, 2009 | Mount Lemmon | Mount Lemmon Survey | · | 1.5 km | MPC · JPL |
| 760750 | 2009 AJ_{46} | — | January 15, 2009 | Kitt Peak | Spacewatch | · | 420 m | MPC · JPL |
| 760751 | 2009 AU_{46} | — | December 22, 2008 | Mount Lemmon | Mount Lemmon Survey | · | 2.0 km | MPC · JPL |
| 760752 | 2009 AZ_{51} | — | January 1, 2009 | Kitt Peak | Spacewatch | · | 2.7 km | MPC · JPL |
| 760753 | 2009 AJ_{52} | — | January 2, 2009 | Kitt Peak | Spacewatch | · | 1.0 km | MPC · JPL |
| 760754 | 2009 AS_{53} | — | November 9, 2013 | Haleakala | Pan-STARRS 1 | EOS | 1.7 km | MPC · JPL |
| 760755 | 2009 AO_{54} | — | January 15, 2009 | Kitt Peak | Spacewatch | · | 480 m | MPC · JPL |
| 760756 | 2009 AU_{54} | — | May 3, 2016 | Haleakala | Pan-STARRS 1 | · | 2.3 km | MPC · JPL |
| 760757 | 2009 AV_{54} | — | October 10, 2012 | Mount Lemmon | Mount Lemmon Survey | · | 1.7 km | MPC · JPL |
| 760758 | 2009 AL_{56} | — | March 6, 2016 | Haleakala | Pan-STARRS 1 | · | 2.7 km | MPC · JPL |
| 760759 | 2009 AF_{57} | — | January 1, 2009 | Kitt Peak | Spacewatch | · | 500 m | MPC · JPL |
| 760760 | 2009 AT_{57} | — | August 24, 2012 | Kitt Peak | Spacewatch | · | 2.6 km | MPC · JPL |
| 760761 | 2009 AV_{57} | — | January 2, 2009 | Kitt Peak | Spacewatch | · | 1.1 km | MPC · JPL |
| 760762 | 2009 AO_{58} | — | November 12, 2013 | Kitt Peak | Spacewatch | · | 2.4 km | MPC · JPL |
| 760763 | 2009 AQ_{58} | — | January 3, 2009 | Kitt Peak | Spacewatch | EOS | 1.4 km | MPC · JPL |
| 760764 | 2009 AX_{58} | — | January 15, 2009 | Kitt Peak | Spacewatch | · | 750 m | MPC · JPL |
| 760765 | 2009 AB_{59} | — | January 2, 2009 | Mount Lemmon | Mount Lemmon Survey | · | 2.4 km | MPC · JPL |
| 760766 | 2009 AR_{59} | — | January 2, 2009 | Kitt Peak | Spacewatch | EOS | 1.3 km | MPC · JPL |
| 760767 | 2009 AS_{59} | — | January 2, 2009 | Mount Lemmon | Mount Lemmon Survey | EOS | 1.3 km | MPC · JPL |
| 760768 | 2009 AE_{60} | — | January 3, 2009 | Kitt Peak | Spacewatch | · | 580 m | MPC · JPL |
| 760769 | 2009 AW_{60} | — | January 2, 2009 | Mount Lemmon | Mount Lemmon Survey | VER | 2.1 km | MPC · JPL |
| 760770 | 2009 AZ_{61} | — | January 2, 2009 | Mount Lemmon | Mount Lemmon Survey | · | 2.5 km | MPC · JPL |
| 760771 | 2009 AT_{62} | — | January 2, 2009 | Kitt Peak | Spacewatch | · | 2.2 km | MPC · JPL |
| 760772 | 2009 AE_{63} | — | January 1, 2009 | Kitt Peak | Spacewatch | · | 2.2 km | MPC · JPL |
| 760773 | 2009 AL_{63} | — | January 3, 2009 | Kitt Peak | Spacewatch | · | 1.3 km | MPC · JPL |
| 760774 | 2009 AM_{63} | — | January 2, 2009 | Mount Lemmon | Mount Lemmon Survey | · | 2.6 km | MPC · JPL |
| 760775 | 2009 AS_{63} | — | January 2, 2009 | Kitt Peak | Spacewatch | · | 1.2 km | MPC · JPL |
| 760776 | 2009 AU_{63} | — | January 1, 2009 | Kitt Peak | Spacewatch | TIR | 2.7 km | MPC · JPL |
| 760777 | 2009 AC_{64} | — | January 1, 2009 | Kitt Peak | Spacewatch | · | 1.6 km | MPC · JPL |
| 760778 | 2009 AQ_{64} | — | January 1, 2009 | Kitt Peak | Spacewatch | · | 3.0 km | MPC · JPL |
| 760779 | 2009 AH_{65} | — | January 1, 2009 | Kitt Peak | Spacewatch | · | 490 m | MPC · JPL |
| 760780 | 2009 AF_{66} | — | January 1, 2009 | Mount Lemmon | Mount Lemmon Survey | · | 2.6 km | MPC · JPL |
| 760781 | 2009 BF_{1} | — | January 17, 2009 | Calar Alto | F. Hormuth | · | 940 m | MPC · JPL |
| 760782 | 2009 BK_{16} | — | January 16, 2009 | Mount Lemmon | Mount Lemmon Survey | · | 2.3 km | MPC · JPL |
| 760783 | 2009 BG_{20} | — | January 2, 2009 | Kitt Peak | Spacewatch | · | 870 m | MPC · JPL |
| 760784 | 2009 BM_{21} | — | December 22, 2008 | Mount Lemmon | Mount Lemmon Survey | · | 2.5 km | MPC · JPL |
| 760785 | 2009 BB_{25} | — | January 18, 2009 | Kitt Peak | Spacewatch | · | 470 m | MPC · JPL |
| 760786 | 2009 BP_{25} | — | January 16, 2009 | Kitt Peak | Spacewatch | · | 2.3 km | MPC · JPL |
| 760787 | 2009 BT_{27} | — | December 31, 2008 | Mount Lemmon | Mount Lemmon Survey | · | 2.7 km | MPC · JPL |
| 760788 | 2009 BE_{36} | — | January 16, 2009 | Kitt Peak | Spacewatch | · | 2.3 km | MPC · JPL |
| 760789 | 2009 BU_{55} | — | January 17, 2009 | Kitt Peak | Spacewatch | · | 2.3 km | MPC · JPL |
| 760790 | 2009 BS_{57} | — | December 29, 2008 | Mount Lemmon | Mount Lemmon Survey | THB | 2.1 km | MPC · JPL |
| 760791 | 2009 BR_{61} | — | January 18, 2009 | Kitt Peak | Spacewatch | · | 2.6 km | MPC · JPL |
| 760792 | 2009 BQ_{62} | — | October 24, 2003 | Apache Point | SDSS | · | 1.6 km | MPC · JPL |
| 760793 | 2009 BW_{62} | — | January 20, 2009 | Kitt Peak | Spacewatch | · | 2.2 km | MPC · JPL |
| 760794 | 2009 BG_{66} | — | January 20, 2009 | Kitt Peak | Spacewatch | · | 2.1 km | MPC · JPL |
| 760795 | 2009 BE_{72} | — | January 18, 2009 | Kitt Peak | Spacewatch | · | 2.4 km | MPC · JPL |
| 760796 | 2009 BU_{73} | — | December 3, 2008 | Mount Lemmon | Mount Lemmon Survey | · | 2.2 km | MPC · JPL |
| 760797 | 2009 BF_{76} | — | January 26, 2009 | Catalina | CSS | · | 2.4 km | MPC · JPL |
| 760798 | 2009 BT_{84} | — | January 25, 2009 | Kitt Peak | Spacewatch | THM | 1.8 km | MPC · JPL |
| 760799 | 2009 BY_{87} | — | January 15, 2009 | Kitt Peak | Spacewatch | · | 2.8 km | MPC · JPL |
| 760800 | 2009 BO_{93} | — | January 25, 2009 | Kitt Peak | Spacewatch | · | 970 m | MPC · JPL |

== 760801–760900 ==
back to top

| Designation | | | Discovery | | | Properties | | Ref |
| Permanent | Provisional | Named after | Date | Site | Discoverer(s) | Category | Diam. | Ref |
|---|---|---|---|---|---|---|---|---|
| 760801 | 2009 BC_{100} | — | January 29, 2009 | Kitt Peak | Spacewatch | TIR | 2.3 km | MPC · JPL |
| 760802 | 2009 BZ_{102} | — | January 30, 2009 | Mount Lemmon | Mount Lemmon Survey | LIX | 2.9 km | MPC · JPL |
| 760803 | 2009 BB_{103} | — | January 30, 2009 | Mount Lemmon | Mount Lemmon Survey | · | 2.4 km | MPC · JPL |
| 760804 | 2009 BK_{103} | — | January 3, 2009 | Mount Lemmon | Mount Lemmon Survey | · | 2.2 km | MPC · JPL |
| 760805 | 2009 BP_{107} | — | February 18, 2005 | La Silla | A. Boattini, H. Scholl | · | 850 m | MPC · JPL |
| 760806 | 2009 BG_{112} | — | January 15, 2009 | Kitt Peak | Spacewatch | · | 2.0 km | MPC · JPL |
| 760807 | 2009 BN_{114} | — | January 1, 2009 | Mount Lemmon | Mount Lemmon Survey | INA | 1.9 km | MPC · JPL |
| 760808 | 2009 BE_{116} | — | December 31, 2008 | Kitt Peak | Spacewatch | THB | 2.1 km | MPC · JPL |
| 760809 | 2009 BH_{116} | — | January 29, 2009 | Kitt Peak | Spacewatch | · | 1 km | MPC · JPL |
| 760810 | 2009 BR_{116} | — | January 29, 2009 | Kitt Peak | Spacewatch | V | 470 m | MPC · JPL |
| 760811 | 2009 BO_{117} | — | January 29, 2009 | Mount Lemmon | Mount Lemmon Survey | HYG | 1.9 km | MPC · JPL |
| 760812 | 2009 BL_{120} | — | January 2, 2009 | Kitt Peak | Spacewatch | TIR | 2.0 km | MPC · JPL |
| 760813 | 2009 BW_{124} | — | January 16, 2009 | Kitt Peak | Spacewatch | · | 2.0 km | MPC · JPL |
| 760814 | 2009 BU_{125} | — | January 15, 2009 | Kitt Peak | Spacewatch | · | 2.1 km | MPC · JPL |
| 760815 | 2009 BL_{133} | — | December 22, 2008 | Kitt Peak | Spacewatch | · | 2.4 km | MPC · JPL |
| 760816 | 2009 BE_{138} | — | January 29, 2009 | Kitt Peak | Spacewatch | · | 1.3 km | MPC · JPL |
| 760817 | 2009 BC_{139} | — | January 29, 2009 | Kitt Peak | Spacewatch | AGN | 860 m | MPC · JPL |
| 760818 | 2009 BR_{139} | — | March 11, 2005 | Mount Lemmon | Mount Lemmon Survey | · | 970 m | MPC · JPL |
| 760819 | 2009 BB_{144} | — | January 20, 2009 | Kitt Peak | Spacewatch | EUN | 880 m | MPC · JPL |
| 760820 | 2009 BW_{145} | — | January 20, 2009 | Kitt Peak | Spacewatch | · | 1.2 km | MPC · JPL |
| 760821 | 2009 BB_{153} | — | January 31, 2009 | Kitt Peak | Spacewatch | · | 1.6 km | MPC · JPL |
| 760822 | 2009 BQ_{153} | — | January 31, 2009 | Kitt Peak | Spacewatch | WIT | 760 m | MPC · JPL |
| 760823 | 2009 BU_{157} | — | January 31, 2009 | Kitt Peak | Spacewatch | · | 2.4 km | MPC · JPL |
| 760824 | 2009 BR_{160} | — | January 31, 2009 | Mount Lemmon | Mount Lemmon Survey | · | 2.0 km | MPC · JPL |
| 760825 | 2009 BK_{162} | — | January 30, 2009 | Kitt Peak | Spacewatch | EOS | 1.5 km | MPC · JPL |
| 760826 | 2009 BK_{164} | — | January 20, 2009 | Kitt Peak | Spacewatch | EOS | 1.3 km | MPC · JPL |
| 760827 | 2009 BY_{169} | — | January 18, 2009 | Kitt Peak | Spacewatch | · | 1.4 km | MPC · JPL |
| 760828 | 2009 BW_{170} | — | January 16, 2009 | Mount Lemmon | Mount Lemmon Survey | · | 2.5 km | MPC · JPL |
| 760829 | 2009 BL_{172} | — | January 18, 2009 | Mount Lemmon | Mount Lemmon Survey | · | 1.2 km | MPC · JPL |
| 760830 | 2009 BQ_{173} | — | January 20, 2009 | Kitt Peak | Spacewatch | · | 1.3 km | MPC · JPL |
| 760831 | 2009 BC_{174} | — | January 25, 2009 | Kitt Peak | Spacewatch | · | 2.3 km | MPC · JPL |
| 760832 | 2009 BQ_{187} | — | January 31, 2009 | Mount Lemmon | Mount Lemmon Survey | · | 2.5 km | MPC · JPL |
| 760833 | 2009 BF_{189} | — | January 16, 2009 | Kitt Peak | Spacewatch | · | 2.2 km | MPC · JPL |
| 760834 | 2009 BT_{194} | — | October 23, 2012 | Mount Lemmon | Mount Lemmon Survey | · | 1.4 km | MPC · JPL |
| 760835 | 2009 BY_{194} | — | January 20, 2009 | Kitt Peak | Spacewatch | · | 520 m | MPC · JPL |
| 760836 | 2009 BS_{195} | — | August 17, 2012 | Haleakala | Pan-STARRS 1 | · | 2.3 km | MPC · JPL |
| 760837 | 2009 BH_{196} | — | October 3, 2014 | Mount Lemmon | Mount Lemmon Survey | · | 680 m | MPC · JPL |
| 760838 | 2009 BT_{196} | — | August 2, 2016 | Haleakala | Pan-STARRS 1 | · | 1.4 km | MPC · JPL |
| 760839 | 2009 BH_{197} | — | April 11, 2016 | Haleakala | Pan-STARRS 1 | · | 2.1 km | MPC · JPL |
| 760840 | 2009 BL_{197} | — | February 18, 2015 | Mount Lemmon | Mount Lemmon Survey | · | 2.6 km | MPC · JPL |
| 760841 | 2009 BF_{198} | — | January 16, 2009 | Kitt Peak | Spacewatch | · | 2.0 km | MPC · JPL |
| 760842 | 2009 BV_{199} | — | September 12, 2007 | Mount Lemmon | Mount Lemmon Survey | THM | 1.9 km | MPC · JPL |
| 760843 | 2009 BR_{200} | — | January 30, 2009 | Mount Lemmon | Mount Lemmon Survey | · | 2.1 km | MPC · JPL |
| 760844 | 2009 BW_{200} | — | January 20, 2009 | Mount Lemmon | Mount Lemmon Survey | · | 1.3 km | MPC · JPL |
| 760845 | 2009 BY_{200} | — | January 20, 2009 | Mount Lemmon | Mount Lemmon Survey | · | 2.2 km | MPC · JPL |
| 760846 | 2009 BM_{201} | — | January 18, 2009 | Kitt Peak | Spacewatch | · | 540 m | MPC · JPL |
| 760847 | 2009 BW_{201} | — | January 31, 2009 | Kitt Peak | Spacewatch | · | 1.2 km | MPC · JPL |
| 760848 | 2009 BK_{202} | — | January 16, 2009 | Mount Lemmon | Mount Lemmon Survey | · | 910 m | MPC · JPL |
| 760849 | 2009 BO_{202} | — | August 1, 2017 | Haleakala | Pan-STARRS 1 | · | 2.1 km | MPC · JPL |
| 760850 | 2009 BK_{203} | — | January 25, 2015 | Haleakala | Pan-STARRS 1 | · | 2.4 km | MPC · JPL |
| 760851 | 2009 BY_{203} | — | January 29, 2009 | Kitt Peak | Spacewatch | · | 2.3 km | MPC · JPL |
| 760852 | 2009 BE_{204} | — | January 31, 2009 | Mount Lemmon | Mount Lemmon Survey | · | 2.3 km | MPC · JPL |
| 760853 | 2009 BH_{204} | — | November 9, 2013 | Haleakala | Pan-STARRS 1 | EOS | 1.5 km | MPC · JPL |
| 760854 | 2009 BS_{204} | — | August 3, 2016 | Haleakala | Pan-STARRS 1 | · | 1.5 km | MPC · JPL |
| 760855 | 2009 BB_{205} | — | January 20, 2009 | Kitt Peak | Spacewatch | EOS | 1.4 km | MPC · JPL |
| 760856 | 2009 BK_{205} | — | January 31, 2009 | Kitt Peak | Spacewatch | · | 2.2 km | MPC · JPL |
| 760857 | 2009 BB_{206} | — | January 18, 2009 | Kitt Peak | Spacewatch | · | 2.1 km | MPC · JPL |
| 760858 | 2009 BC_{206} | — | January 29, 2009 | Kitt Peak | Spacewatch | VER | 1.8 km | MPC · JPL |
| 760859 | 2009 BE_{206} | — | January 17, 2009 | Mount Lemmon | Mount Lemmon Survey | · | 1.9 km | MPC · JPL |
| 760860 | 2009 BK_{206} | — | January 18, 2009 | Kitt Peak | Spacewatch | · | 2.1 km | MPC · JPL |
| 760861 | 2009 BP_{206} | — | January 16, 2009 | Mount Lemmon | Mount Lemmon Survey | · | 1.8 km | MPC · JPL |
| 760862 | 2009 BL_{207} | — | January 29, 2009 | Kitt Peak | Spacewatch | · | 2.1 km | MPC · JPL |
| 760863 | 2009 BA_{208} | — | January 29, 2009 | Kitt Peak | Spacewatch | · | 2.1 km | MPC · JPL |
| 760864 | 2009 BM_{208} | — | January 31, 2009 | Mount Lemmon | Mount Lemmon Survey | · | 1.8 km | MPC · JPL |
| 760865 | 2009 BA_{210} | — | January 31, 2009 | Kitt Peak | Spacewatch | · | 720 m | MPC · JPL |
| 760866 | 2009 BC_{210} | — | January 25, 2009 | Kitt Peak | Spacewatch | EUN | 960 m | MPC · JPL |
| 760867 | 2009 BM_{210} | — | June 24, 2017 | Haleakala | Pan-STARRS 1 | VER | 2.0 km | MPC · JPL |
| 760868 | 2009 BO_{211} | — | January 16, 2009 | Kitt Peak | Spacewatch | · | 860 m | MPC · JPL |
| 760869 | 2009 BS_{211} | — | January 20, 2009 | Kitt Peak | Spacewatch | · | 2.2 km | MPC · JPL |
| 760870 | 2009 BR_{215} | — | October 12, 2007 | Mount Lemmon | Mount Lemmon Survey | · | 1.2 km | MPC · JPL |
| 760871 | 2009 BX_{215} | — | January 20, 2009 | Kitt Peak | Spacewatch | · | 1.0 km | MPC · JPL |
| 760872 | 2009 BR_{216} | — | January 31, 2009 | Kitt Peak | Spacewatch | EOS | 1.2 km | MPC · JPL |
| 760873 | 2009 BN_{217} | — | January 20, 2009 | Mount Lemmon | Mount Lemmon Survey | · | 2.0 km | MPC · JPL |
| 760874 | 2009 BD_{218} | — | January 30, 2009 | Mount Lemmon | Mount Lemmon Survey | · | 2.4 km | MPC · JPL |
| 760875 | 2009 CV_{13} | — | February 2, 2009 | Mount Lemmon | Mount Lemmon Survey | EUN | 960 m | MPC · JPL |
| 760876 | 2009 CB_{14} | — | May 10, 2005 | Kitt Peak | Spacewatch | · | 1.5 km | MPC · JPL |
| 760877 | 2009 CU_{19} | — | January 1, 2009 | Kitt Peak | Spacewatch | · | 1.1 km | MPC · JPL |
| 760878 | 2009 CT_{20} | — | February 1, 2009 | Kitt Peak | Spacewatch | · | 1.1 km | MPC · JPL |
| 760879 | 2009 CD_{21} | — | September 18, 2003 | Kitt Peak | Spacewatch | (5) | 860 m | MPC · JPL |
| 760880 | 2009 CE_{22} | — | February 1, 2009 | Kitt Peak | Spacewatch | · | 1.3 km | MPC · JPL |
| 760881 | 2009 CY_{23} | — | January 17, 2009 | Mount Lemmon | Mount Lemmon Survey | · | 2.0 km | MPC · JPL |
| 760882 | 2009 CB_{28} | — | January 17, 2009 | Kitt Peak | Spacewatch | · | 2.3 km | MPC · JPL |
| 760883 | 2009 CH_{28} | — | February 1, 2009 | Kitt Peak | Spacewatch | · | 1.4 km | MPC · JPL |
| 760884 | 2009 CX_{29} | — | February 1, 2009 | Kitt Peak | Spacewatch | · | 1.4 km | MPC · JPL |
| 760885 | 2009 CK_{35} | — | February 2, 2009 | Mount Lemmon | Mount Lemmon Survey | · | 1.9 km | MPC · JPL |
| 760886 | 2009 CE_{41} | — | February 3, 2009 | Kitt Peak | Spacewatch | · | 2.3 km | MPC · JPL |
| 760887 | 2009 CP_{42} | — | January 2, 2009 | Kitt Peak | Spacewatch | · | 2.3 km | MPC · JPL |
| 760888 | 2009 CY_{42} | — | December 30, 2008 | Kitt Peak | Spacewatch | LIX | 2.2 km | MPC · JPL |
| 760889 | 2009 CA_{46} | — | January 17, 2009 | Mount Lemmon | Mount Lemmon Survey | · | 2.0 km | MPC · JPL |
| 760890 | 2009 CL_{46} | — | January 2, 2009 | Kitt Peak | Spacewatch | THM | 2.0 km | MPC · JPL |
| 760891 | 2009 CB_{53} | — | January 25, 2009 | Kitt Peak | Spacewatch | · | 2.1 km | MPC · JPL |
| 760892 | 2009 CW_{53} | — | February 14, 2009 | Catalina | CSS | · | 2.5 km | MPC · JPL |
| 760893 | 2009 CW_{55} | — | February 1, 2009 | Kitt Peak | Spacewatch | · | 820 m | MPC · JPL |
| 760894 | 2009 CP_{60} | — | February 4, 2009 | Mount Lemmon | Mount Lemmon Survey | · | 2.1 km | MPC · JPL |
| 760895 | 2009 CU_{60} | — | October 15, 2007 | Kitt Peak | Spacewatch | HYG | 2.4 km | MPC · JPL |
| 760896 | 2009 CZ_{63} | — | February 1, 2009 | Kitt Peak | Spacewatch | · | 2.3 km | MPC · JPL |
| 760897 | 2009 CH_{68} | — | November 6, 2012 | Nogales | M. Schwartz, P. R. Holvorcem | BAR | 960 m | MPC · JPL |
| 760898 | 2009 CV_{69} | — | April 10, 2014 | Haleakala | Pan-STARRS 1 | · | 1.6 km | MPC · JPL |
| 760899 | 2009 CJ_{70} | — | June 15, 2015 | Haleakala | Pan-STARRS 1 | H | 390 m | MPC · JPL |
| 760900 | 2009 CV_{70} | — | February 4, 2009 | Mount Lemmon | Mount Lemmon Survey | LIX | 2.0 km | MPC · JPL |

== 760901–761000 ==
back to top

| Designation | | | Discovery | | | Properties | | Ref |
| Permanent | Provisional | Named after | Date | Site | Discoverer(s) | Category | Diam. | Ref |
|---|---|---|---|---|---|---|---|---|
| 760901 | 2009 CV_{71} | — | January 1, 2009 | Kitt Peak | Spacewatch | · | 1.6 km | MPC · JPL |
| 760902 | 2009 CA_{72} | — | September 24, 2012 | Kitt Peak | Spacewatch | · | 2.0 km | MPC · JPL |
| 760903 | 2009 CG_{72} | — | December 22, 2008 | Kitt Peak | Spacewatch | · | 1.3 km | MPC · JPL |
| 760904 | 2009 CL_{72} | — | August 1, 2016 | Haleakala | Pan-STARRS 1 | · | 2.5 km | MPC · JPL |
| 760905 | 2009 CP_{72} | — | January 18, 2013 | Kitt Peak | Spacewatch | · | 1.1 km | MPC · JPL |
| 760906 | 2009 CQ_{72} | — | February 3, 2009 | Kitt Peak | Spacewatch | · | 550 m | MPC · JPL |
| 760907 | 2009 CS_{72} | — | March 19, 2015 | Cerro Paranal | Gaia Ground Based Optical Tracking | · | 2.1 km | MPC · JPL |
| 760908 | 2009 CV_{72} | — | February 14, 2009 | Kitt Peak | Spacewatch | TIR | 1.8 km | MPC · JPL |
| 760909 | 2009 CD_{73} | — | February 1, 2009 | Kitt Peak | Spacewatch | PHO | 730 m | MPC · JPL |
| 760910 | 2009 CG_{74} | — | February 18, 2015 | Kitt Peak | Research and Education Collaborative Occultation Network | (43176) | 1.9 km | MPC · JPL |
| 760911 | 2009 CK_{74} | — | November 3, 2014 | Mount Lemmon | Mount Lemmon Survey | · | 500 m | MPC · JPL |
| 760912 | 2009 CO_{74} | — | June 25, 2017 | Haleakala | Pan-STARRS 1 | · | 2.2 km | MPC · JPL |
| 760913 | 2009 CK_{75} | — | February 13, 2009 | Kitt Peak | Spacewatch | · | 1.0 km | MPC · JPL |
| 760914 | 2009 CD_{76} | — | February 3, 2009 | Kitt Peak | Spacewatch | · | 2.3 km | MPC · JPL |
| 760915 | 2009 CQ_{76} | — | January 17, 2009 | Kitt Peak | Spacewatch | · | 1.6 km | MPC · JPL |
| 760916 | 2009 CD_{77} | — | February 4, 2009 | Kitt Peak | Spacewatch | · | 2.3 km | MPC · JPL |
| 760917 | 2009 CT_{77} | — | February 1, 2009 | Kitt Peak | Spacewatch | · | 2.4 km | MPC · JPL |
| 760918 | 2009 CB_{78} | — | February 3, 2009 | Kitt Peak | Spacewatch | · | 1.1 km | MPC · JPL |
| 760919 | 2009 CP_{78} | — | February 3, 2009 | Mount Lemmon | Mount Lemmon Survey | · | 2.4 km | MPC · JPL |
| 760920 | 2009 CS_{78} | — | February 1, 2009 | Kitt Peak | Spacewatch | HOF | 2.0 km | MPC · JPL |
| 760921 | 2009 CC_{79} | — | February 1, 2009 | Mount Lemmon | Mount Lemmon Survey | · | 1.3 km | MPC · JPL |
| 760922 | 2009 DQ | — | February 17, 2009 | Wildberg | R. Apitzsch | · | 1.8 km | MPC · JPL |
| 760923 | 2009 DB_{15} | — | January 19, 2009 | Catalina | CSS | T_{j} (2.88) | 2.1 km | MPC · JPL |
| 760924 | 2009 DT_{20} | — | January 18, 2009 | Kitt Peak | Spacewatch | · | 2.1 km | MPC · JPL |
| 760925 | 2009 DC_{23} | — | October 8, 2007 | Mount Lemmon | Mount Lemmon Survey | THM | 1.6 km | MPC · JPL |
| 760926 | 2009 DG_{23} | — | February 19, 2009 | Kitt Peak | Spacewatch | EOS | 1.4 km | MPC · JPL |
| 760927 | 2009 DK_{25} | — | December 31, 2008 | Mount Lemmon | Mount Lemmon Survey | THM | 2.0 km | MPC · JPL |
| 760928 | 2009 DU_{27} | — | February 4, 2009 | Mount Lemmon | Mount Lemmon Survey | THM | 2.0 km | MPC · JPL |
| 760929 | 2009 DA_{29} | — | February 23, 2009 | Calar Alto | F. Hormuth | · | 650 m | MPC · JPL |
| 760930 | 2009 DH_{38} | — | February 24, 2009 | Calar Alto | F. Hormuth | · | 2.3 km | MPC · JPL |
| 760931 | 2009 DV_{51} | — | January 15, 2009 | Kitt Peak | Spacewatch | · | 810 m | MPC · JPL |
| 760932 | 2009 DC_{52} | — | February 3, 2009 | Kitt Peak | Spacewatch | · | 1.8 km | MPC · JPL |
| 760933 | 2009 DS_{54} | — | January 31, 2009 | Kitt Peak | Spacewatch | · | 1.0 km | MPC · JPL |
| 760934 | 2009 DT_{55} | — | February 22, 2009 | Kitt Peak | Spacewatch | · | 2.0 km | MPC · JPL |
| 760935 | 2009 DM_{66} | — | February 24, 2009 | Mount Lemmon | Mount Lemmon Survey | · | 1.0 km | MPC · JPL |
| 760936 | 2009 DQ_{70} | — | February 26, 2009 | Mount Lemmon | Mount Lemmon Survey | · | 860 m | MPC · JPL |
| 760937 | 2009 DB_{73} | — | February 25, 2009 | Calar Alto | F. Hormuth | · | 1.5 km | MPC · JPL |
| 760938 | 2009 DO_{86} | — | February 19, 2009 | Kitt Peak | Spacewatch | VER | 2.3 km | MPC · JPL |
| 760939 | 2009 DN_{89} | — | January 30, 2009 | Mount Lemmon | Mount Lemmon Survey | · | 1.9 km | MPC · JPL |
| 760940 | 2009 DD_{91} | — | September 24, 2007 | Kitt Peak | Spacewatch | · | 1.9 km | MPC · JPL |
| 760941 | 2009 DK_{95} | — | January 29, 2009 | Catalina | CSS | T_{j} (2.96) | 2.7 km | MPC · JPL |
| 760942 | 2009 DX_{97} | — | February 26, 2009 | Kitt Peak | Spacewatch | · | 1.3 km | MPC · JPL |
| 760943 | 2009 DB_{101} | — | February 26, 2009 | Kitt Peak | Spacewatch | · | 2.9 km | MPC · JPL |
| 760944 | 2009 DA_{104} | — | February 26, 2009 | Mount Lemmon | Mount Lemmon Survey | · | 490 m | MPC · JPL |
| 760945 | 2009 DT_{104} | — | February 26, 2009 | Kitt Peak | Spacewatch | THM | 1.9 km | MPC · JPL |
| 760946 | 2009 DX_{105} | — | February 26, 2009 | Kitt Peak | Spacewatch | · | 1.3 km | MPC · JPL |
| 760947 | 2009 DT_{120} | — | February 27, 2009 | Kitt Peak | Spacewatch | LUT | 2.7 km | MPC · JPL |
| 760948 | 2009 DO_{121} | — | February 27, 2009 | Kitt Peak | Spacewatch | · | 1.7 km | MPC · JPL |
| 760949 | 2009 DP_{124} | — | February 19, 2009 | Kitt Peak | Spacewatch | · | 2.4 km | MPC · JPL |
| 760950 | 2009 DQ_{124} | — | February 19, 2009 | Kitt Peak | Spacewatch | · | 2.1 km | MPC · JPL |
| 760951 | 2009 DM_{131} | — | February 19, 2009 | Kitt Peak | Spacewatch | · | 2.5 km | MPC · JPL |
| 760952 | 2009 DJ_{145} | — | February 20, 2009 | Kitt Peak | Spacewatch | AGN | 900 m | MPC · JPL |
| 760953 | 2009 DA_{146} | — | March 17, 2015 | Haleakala | Pan-STARRS 1 | EOS | 1.4 km | MPC · JPL |
| 760954 | 2009 DJ_{147} | — | February 19, 2009 | Mount Lemmon | Mount Lemmon Survey | · | 840 m | MPC · JPL |
| 760955 | 2009 DY_{147} | — | February 1, 2017 | Haleakala | Pan-STARRS 1 | H | 470 m | MPC · JPL |
| 760956 | 2009 DN_{150} | — | February 25, 2015 | Haleakala | Pan-STARRS 1 | · | 2.3 km | MPC · JPL |
| 760957 | 2009 DA_{151} | — | February 20, 2009 | Kitt Peak | Spacewatch | · | 2.0 km | MPC · JPL |
| 760958 | 2009 DQ_{151} | — | May 18, 2013 | Mount Lemmon | Mount Lemmon Survey | · | 790 m | MPC · JPL |
| 760959 | 2009 DW_{152} | — | February 20, 2009 | Kitt Peak | Spacewatch | · | 2.4 km | MPC · JPL |
| 760960 | 2009 DX_{152} | — | February 19, 2009 | Kitt Peak | Spacewatch | EOS | 1.4 km | MPC · JPL |
| 760961 | 2009 DB_{153} | — | February 20, 2009 | Kitt Peak | Spacewatch | · | 1.3 km | MPC · JPL |
| 760962 | 2009 DO_{153} | — | February 19, 2009 | Kitt Peak | Spacewatch | THM | 1.8 km | MPC · JPL |
| 760963 | 2009 DW_{153} | — | February 19, 2009 | Kitt Peak | Spacewatch | · | 2.4 km | MPC · JPL |
| 760964 | 2009 DZ_{153} | — | February 20, 2009 | Mount Lemmon | Mount Lemmon Survey | · | 2.7 km | MPC · JPL |
| 760965 | 2009 DA_{154} | — | February 22, 2009 | Kitt Peak | Spacewatch | · | 2.2 km | MPC · JPL |
| 760966 | 2009 DF_{154} | — | February 19, 2009 | Kitt Peak | Spacewatch | · | 2.3 km | MPC · JPL |
| 760967 | 2009 DO_{154} | — | February 19, 2009 | Kitt Peak | Spacewatch | · | 2.3 km | MPC · JPL |
| 760968 | 2009 DE_{155} | — | February 24, 2009 | Mount Lemmon | Mount Lemmon Survey | THB | 2.0 km | MPC · JPL |
| 760969 | 2009 DR_{155} | — | February 20, 2009 | Kitt Peak | Spacewatch | H | 350 m | MPC · JPL |
| 760970 | 2009 DA_{156} | — | February 27, 2009 | Mount Lemmon | Mount Lemmon Survey | · | 2.2 km | MPC · JPL |
| 760971 | 2009 DP_{156} | — | February 22, 2009 | Kitt Peak | Spacewatch | · | 2.9 km | MPC · JPL |
| 760972 | 2009 DQ_{156} | — | February 27, 2009 | Kitt Peak | Spacewatch | T_{j} (2.93) | 2.7 km | MPC · JPL |
| 760973 | 2009 DO_{157} | — | February 28, 2009 | Kitt Peak | Spacewatch | · | 2.0 km | MPC · JPL |
| 760974 | 2009 DU_{158} | — | February 20, 2009 | Kitt Peak | Spacewatch | · | 2.1 km | MPC · JPL |
| 760975 | 2009 DO_{159} | — | February 28, 2009 | Mount Lemmon | Mount Lemmon Survey | · | 1.4 km | MPC · JPL |
| 760976 | 2009 DW_{163} | — | February 20, 2009 | Kitt Peak | Spacewatch | (5) | 970 m | MPC · JPL |
| 760977 | 2009 DE_{165} | — | February 28, 2009 | Kitt Peak | Spacewatch | · | 630 m | MPC · JPL |
| 760978 | 2009 ED_{2} | — | March 1, 2009 | Kitt Peak | Spacewatch | TIR | 2.2 km | MPC · JPL |
| 760979 | 2009 EY_{7} | — | March 2, 2009 | Mount Lemmon | Mount Lemmon Survey | · | 2.5 km | MPC · JPL |
| 760980 | 2009 ER_{8} | — | January 29, 2009 | Mount Lemmon | Mount Lemmon Survey | HYG | 2.1 km | MPC · JPL |
| 760981 | 2009 ED_{10} | — | February 1, 2009 | Kitt Peak | Spacewatch | · | 1.4 km | MPC · JPL |
| 760982 | 2009 EK_{11} | — | March 2, 2009 | Mount Lemmon | Mount Lemmon Survey | EOS | 1.5 km | MPC · JPL |
| 760983 | 2009 EF_{13} | — | March 15, 2009 | Mount Lemmon | Mount Lemmon Survey | · | 1.1 km | MPC · JPL |
| 760984 | 2009 EC_{24} | — | February 20, 2009 | Kitt Peak | Spacewatch | LIX | 2.4 km | MPC · JPL |
| 760985 | 2009 EH_{24} | — | March 1, 2009 | Kitt Peak | Spacewatch | · | 2.1 km | MPC · JPL |
| 760986 | 2009 EE_{28} | — | March 1, 2009 | Kitt Peak | Spacewatch | MAR | 790 m | MPC · JPL |
| 760987 | 2009 EW_{29} | — | March 7, 2009 | Mount Lemmon | Mount Lemmon Survey | · | 2.0 km | MPC · JPL |
| 760988 | 2009 EH_{32} | — | January 25, 2014 | Haleakala | Pan-STARRS 1 | · | 2.1 km | MPC · JPL |
| 760989 | 2009 EU_{32} | — | March 1, 2009 | Mount Lemmon | Mount Lemmon Survey | HNS | 710 m | MPC · JPL |
| 760990 | 2009 EX_{33} | — | March 1, 2009 | Mount Lemmon | Mount Lemmon Survey | · | 2.3 km | MPC · JPL |
| 760991 | 2009 EG_{34} | — | April 4, 2014 | Haleakala | Pan-STARRS 1 | · | 1.6 km | MPC · JPL |
| 760992 | 2009 EP_{34} | — | October 15, 2015 | Haleakala | Pan-STARRS 1 | · | 880 m | MPC · JPL |
| 760993 | 2009 EO_{35} | — | March 2, 2009 | Mount Lemmon | Mount Lemmon Survey | · | 470 m | MPC · JPL |
| 760994 | 2009 ER_{35} | — | March 14, 2013 | Kitt Peak | Spacewatch | HNS | 740 m | MPC · JPL |
| 760995 | 2009 EZ_{35} | — | March 1, 2009 | Mount Lemmon | Mount Lemmon Survey | MAR | 810 m | MPC · JPL |
| 760996 | 2009 EC_{37} | — | May 6, 2014 | Haleakala | Pan-STARRS 1 | · | 1.3 km | MPC · JPL |
| 760997 | 2009 EE_{37} | — | May 7, 2014 | Haleakala | Pan-STARRS 1 | · | 1.1 km | MPC · JPL |
| 760998 | 2009 EF_{37} | — | September 29, 2011 | Mount Lemmon | Mount Lemmon Survey | · | 1.2 km | MPC · JPL |
| 760999 | 2009 EF_{38} | — | July 26, 2017 | Haleakala | Pan-STARRS 1 | · | 2.4 km | MPC · JPL |
| 761000 | 2009 EP_{38} | — | July 23, 2015 | Haleakala | Pan-STARRS 1 | · | 1.2 km | MPC · JPL |

back to top
