= List of minor planets: 685001–686000 =

The following is a partial list of minor planets, running from minor-planet number 685001 through 686000, inclusive. The primary data for this and other partial lists is based on JPL's "Small-Body Orbital Elements" and data available from the Minor Planet Center. Critical list information is also provided by the MPC, unless otherwise specified from Lowell Observatory. A detailed description of the table's columns and additional sources are given on the main page including a complete list of every page in this series, and a statistical break-up on the dynamical classification of minor planets.

Also see the summary list of all named bodies in numerical and alphabetical order, and the corresponding naming citations for the number range of this particular list. New namings may only be added to this list after official publication, as the preannouncement of names is condemned by the Working Group for Small Bodies Nomenclature of the International Astronomical Union.

| Near-Earth obj. | MBA (inner) | MBA (outer) | Centaur |
| Mars-crosser | MBA (middle) | Jupiter trojan | Trans-Neptunian obj. |
| Unclassified |

== 685001–685100 ==
| Designation | | | Discovery | | | Properties | | Ref |
| Permanent | Provisional | Named after | Date | Site | Discoverer(s) | Category | Diam. | Ref |
|---|---|---|---|---|---|---|---|---|
| 685001 | 2009 BD_{204} | — | January 16, 2009 | Mount Lemmon | Mount Lemmon Survey | BRA | 1.2 km | MPC; JPL |
| 685002 | 2009 BU_{204} | — | August 26, 2011 | Kitt Peak | Spacewatch | MAS | 560 m | MPC; JPL |
| 685003 | 2009 BV_{204} | — | January 26, 2009 | Mount Lemmon | Mount Lemmon Survey | · | 780 m | MPC; JPL |
| 685004 | 2009 BM_{205} | — | January 31, 2009 | Kitt Peak | Spacewatch | KOR | 1.2 km | MPC; JPL |
| 685005 | 2009 BR_{205} | — | January 25, 2009 | Kitt Peak | Spacewatch | NYS | 900 m | MPC; JPL |
| 685006 | 2009 BF_{208} | — | January 18, 2009 | Mount Lemmon | Mount Lemmon Survey | V | 450 m | MPC; JPL |
| 685007 | 2009 BK_{208} | — | January 29, 2009 | Mount Lemmon | Mount Lemmon Survey | PHO | 530 m | MPC; JPL |
| 685008 | 2009 BG_{209} | — | January 20, 2009 | Kitt Peak | Spacewatch | · | 1.3 km | MPC; JPL |
| 685009 | 2009 BJ_{211} | — | January 20, 2009 | Kitt Peak | Spacewatch | · | 1.4 km | MPC; JPL |
| 685010 | 2009 BU_{212} | — | January 16, 2009 | Kitt Peak | Spacewatch | · | 1.1 km | MPC; JPL |
| 685011 | 2009 BQ_{213} | — | January 20, 2009 | Kitt Peak | Spacewatch | KOR | 1.2 km | MPC; JPL |
| 685012 | 2009 BR_{213} | — | January 26, 2009 | Mount Lemmon | Mount Lemmon Survey | · | 1.4 km | MPC; JPL |
| 685013 | 2009 BZ_{213} | — | January 30, 2009 | Kitt Peak | Spacewatch | · | 1.3 km | MPC; JPL |
| 685014 | 2009 BC_{214} | — | January 19, 2009 | Mount Lemmon | Mount Lemmon Survey | · | 1.4 km | MPC; JPL |
| 685015 | 2009 BK_{214} | — | January 20, 2009 | Kitt Peak | Spacewatch | · | 1.4 km | MPC; JPL |
| 685016 | 2009 BP_{218} | — | April 25, 2015 | Haleakala | Pan-STARRS 1 | · | 1.4 km | MPC; JPL |
| 685017 | 2009 CQ_{3} | — | February 2, 2009 | Moletai | K. Černis, Zdanavicius, J. | · | 3.0 km | MPC; JPL |
| 685018 | 2009 CS_{4} | — | January 17, 2009 | Mount Lemmon | Mount Lemmon Survey | · | 1.8 km | MPC; JPL |
| 685019 | 2009 CB_{10} | — | February 1, 2009 | Mount Lemmon | Mount Lemmon Survey | · | 1.7 km | MPC; JPL |
| 685020 | 2009 CC_{13} | — | November 21, 2003 | Palomar | NEAT | JUN | 1.0 km | MPC; JPL |
| 685021 | 2009 CO_{13} | — | October 9, 2007 | Mount Lemmon | Mount Lemmon Survey | · | 1.5 km | MPC; JPL |
| 685022 | 2009 CX_{23} | — | February 1, 2009 | Kitt Peak | Spacewatch | NYS | 890 m | MPC; JPL |
| 685023 | 2009 CF_{27} | — | February 1, 2009 | Kitt Peak | Spacewatch | · | 1.4 km | MPC; JPL |
| 685024 | 2009 CT_{30} | — | December 3, 2004 | Kitt Peak | Spacewatch | MAS | 720 m | MPC; JPL |
| 685025 | 2009 CE_{32} | — | February 1, 2009 | Kitt Peak | Spacewatch | AGN | 960 m | MPC; JPL |
| 685026 | 2009 CM_{35} | — | December 21, 2008 | Kitt Peak | Spacewatch | · | 1.8 km | MPC; JPL |
| 685027 | 2009 CN_{35} | — | February 2, 2009 | Mount Lemmon | Mount Lemmon Survey | NYS | 780 m | MPC; JPL |
| 685028 | 2009 CQ_{39} | — | January 31, 2009 | Kitt Peak | Spacewatch | · | 1.8 km | MPC; JPL |
| 685029 | 2009 CW_{46} | — | May 7, 2006 | Mount Lemmon | Mount Lemmon Survey | · | 800 m | MPC; JPL |
| 685030 | 2009 CY_{46} | — | September 12, 2007 | Kitt Peak | Spacewatch | · | 1.4 km | MPC; JPL |
| 685031 | 2009 CT_{52} | — | January 20, 2009 | Kitt Peak | Spacewatch | MAS | 550 m | MPC; JPL |
| 685032 | 2009 CM_{54} | — | February 14, 2009 | Mount Lemmon | Mount Lemmon Survey | · | 1.6 km | MPC; JPL |
| 685033 | 2009 CS_{58} | — | February 4, 2009 | Mount Lemmon | Mount Lemmon Survey | · | 890 m | MPC; JPL |
| 685034 | 2009 CY_{63} | — | February 1, 2009 | Kitt Peak | Spacewatch | V | 440 m | MPC; JPL |
| 685035 | 2009 CW_{65} | — | January 29, 2009 | Kitt Peak | Spacewatch | NYS | 910 m | MPC; JPL |
| 685036 | 2009 CM_{68} | — | February 28, 2014 | Haleakala | Pan-STARRS 1 | HOF | 2.3 km | MPC; JPL |
| 685037 | 2009 CN_{69} | — | February 4, 2009 | Mount Lemmon | Mount Lemmon Survey | PHO | 840 m | MPC; JPL |
| 685038 | 2009 CY_{71} | — | September 15, 2012 | Catalina | CSS | · | 3.0 km | MPC; JPL |
| 685039 | 2009 CO_{73} | — | November 22, 2012 | Kitt Peak | Spacewatch | · | 1.7 km | MPC; JPL |
| 685040 | 2009 CH_{75} | — | February 1, 2009 | Kitt Peak | Spacewatch | · | 1.6 km | MPC; JPL |
| 685041 | 2009 CY_{76} | — | February 1, 2009 | Kitt Peak | Spacewatch | NYS | 860 m | MPC; JPL |
| 685042 | 2009 CG_{78} | — | February 1, 2009 | Kitt Peak | Spacewatch | · | 1.2 km | MPC; JPL |
| 685043 | 2009 CQ_{78} | — | February 3, 2009 | Mount Lemmon | Mount Lemmon Survey | · | 1.3 km | MPC; JPL |
| 685044 | 2009 CY_{78} | — | February 3, 2009 | Mount Lemmon | Mount Lemmon Survey | · | 1.5 km | MPC; JPL |
| 685045 | 2009 CY_{79} | — | February 2, 2009 | Mount Lemmon | Mount Lemmon Survey | · | 1.1 km | MPC; JPL |
| 685046 | 2009 DG_{5} | — | February 20, 2009 | Calar Alto | F. Hormuth | · | 1.7 km | MPC; JPL |
| 685047 | 2009 DP_{20} | — | January 16, 2009 | Kitt Peak | Spacewatch | V | 520 m | MPC; JPL |
| 685048 | 2009 DL_{23} | — | February 4, 2009 | Mount Lemmon | Mount Lemmon Survey | · | 1.3 km | MPC; JPL |
| 685049 | 2009 DF_{25} | — | February 21, 2009 | Mount Lemmon | Mount Lemmon Survey | AST | 1.4 km | MPC; JPL |
| 685050 | 2009 DX_{28} | — | February 23, 2009 | Calar Alto | F. Hormuth | · | 1.3 km | MPC; JPL |
| 685051 | 2009 DJ_{32} | — | May 16, 2005 | Mount Lemmon | Mount Lemmon Survey | · | 1.7 km | MPC; JPL |
| 685052 | 2009 DW_{36} | — | February 23, 2009 | Calar Alto | F. Hormuth | · | 1.5 km | MPC; JPL |
| 685053 | 2009 DJ_{38} | — | February 24, 2009 | Calar Alto | F. Hormuth | · | 700 m | MPC; JPL |
| 685054 | 2009 DW_{43} | — | February 2, 2009 | Kitt Peak | Spacewatch | · | 940 m | MPC; JPL |
| 685055 | 2009 DH_{47} | — | December 31, 2008 | Mount Lemmon | Mount Lemmon Survey | · | 770 m | MPC; JPL |
| 685056 | 2009 DO_{51} | — | February 21, 2009 | Mount Lemmon | Mount Lemmon Survey | NYS | 880 m | MPC; JPL |
| 685057 | 2009 DR_{65} | — | February 22, 2009 | Mount Lemmon | Mount Lemmon Survey | · | 980 m | MPC; JPL |
| 685058 | 2009 DS_{65} | — | April 8, 2002 | Palomar | NEAT | · | 1.1 km | MPC; JPL |
| 685059 | 2009 DB_{66} | — | February 24, 2009 | Mount Lemmon | Mount Lemmon Survey | · | 1.2 km | MPC; JPL |
| 685060 | 2009 DD_{76} | — | December 30, 2008 | Mount Lemmon | Mount Lemmon Survey | · | 1.2 km | MPC; JPL |
| 685061 | 2009 DX_{80} | — | November 19, 2007 | Mount Lemmon | Mount Lemmon Survey | AGN | 950 m | MPC; JPL |
| 685062 | 2009 DR_{85} | — | February 27, 2009 | Kitt Peak | Spacewatch | · | 3.5 km | MPC; JPL |
| 685063 | 2009 DG_{86} | — | February 27, 2009 | Kitt Peak | Spacewatch | NYS | 880 m | MPC; JPL |
| 685064 | 2009 DQ_{86} | — | February 19, 2009 | Kitt Peak | Spacewatch | NYS | 790 m | MPC; JPL |
| 685065 | 2009 DO_{87} | — | February 27, 2009 | Kitt Peak | Spacewatch | · | 1.8 km | MPC; JPL |
| 685066 | 2009 DV_{90} | — | February 26, 2009 | Kitt Peak | Spacewatch | · | 800 m | MPC; JPL |
| 685067 | 2009 DO_{97} | — | February 14, 2009 | Kitt Peak | Spacewatch | · | 800 m | MPC; JPL |
| 685068 | 2009 DX_{99} | — | February 26, 2009 | Kitt Peak | Spacewatch | NYS | 1.1 km | MPC; JPL |
| 685069 | 2009 DM_{107} | — | November 13, 2007 | Kitt Peak | Spacewatch | KOR | 1.2 km | MPC; JPL |
| 685070 | 2009 DX_{107} | — | February 2, 2009 | Kitt Peak | Spacewatch | GEF | 1.0 km | MPC; JPL |
| 685071 | 2009 DP_{114} | — | February 26, 2009 | Calar Alto | F. Hormuth | MAS | 550 m | MPC; JPL |
| 685072 | 2009 DD_{118} | — | February 27, 2009 | Kitt Peak | Spacewatch | NYS | 880 m | MPC; JPL |
| 685073 | 2009 DC_{128} | — | February 21, 2009 | Kitt Peak | Spacewatch | · | 930 m | MPC; JPL |
| 685074 | 2009 DS_{144} | — | February 18, 2009 | Socorro | LINEAR | DOR | 2.0 km | MPC; JPL |
| 685075 | 2009 DG_{149} | — | February 19, 2009 | Kitt Peak | Spacewatch | · | 1.0 km | MPC; JPL |
| 685076 | 2009 DE_{150} | — | September 23, 2015 | Haleakala | Pan-STARRS 1 | · | 1.2 km | MPC; JPL |
| 685077 | 2009 DM_{151} | — | January 12, 1996 | Kitt Peak | Spacewatch | · | 1.1 km | MPC; JPL |
| 685078 | 2009 DS_{152} | — | February 19, 2009 | Kitt Peak | Spacewatch | · | 930 m | MPC; JPL |
| 685079 | 2009 DE_{153} | — | February 28, 2009 | Kitt Peak | Spacewatch | · | 1.5 km | MPC; JPL |
| 685080 | 2009 DH_{153} | — | February 22, 2009 | Kitt Peak | Spacewatch | NYS | 1 km | MPC; JPL |
| 685081 | 2009 DP_{153} | — | February 19, 2009 | Kitt Peak | Spacewatch | LIX | 2.6 km | MPC; JPL |
| 685082 | 2009 DH_{154} | — | February 26, 2009 | Kitt Peak | Spacewatch | · | 800 m | MPC; JPL |
| 685083 | 2009 DP_{154} | — | February 24, 2009 | Kitt Peak | Spacewatch | · | 730 m | MPC; JPL |
| 685084 | 2009 DV_{154} | — | February 20, 2009 | Mount Lemmon | Mount Lemmon Survey | PHO | 870 m | MPC; JPL |
| 685085 | 2009 DW_{154} | — | February 20, 2009 | Kitt Peak | Spacewatch | NYS | 910 m | MPC; JPL |
| 685086 | 2009 DU_{155} | — | February 20, 2009 | Kitt Peak | Spacewatch | MAS | 540 m | MPC; JPL |
| 685087 | 2009 DM_{157} | — | February 19, 2009 | Mount Lemmon | Mount Lemmon Survey | · | 940 m | MPC; JPL |
| 685088 | 2009 DN_{157} | — | February 20, 2009 | Kitt Peak | Spacewatch | · | 780 m | MPC; JPL |
| 685089 | 2009 DV_{158} | — | February 20, 2009 | Kitt Peak | Spacewatch | MRX | 820 m | MPC; JPL |
| 685090 | 2009 DZ_{158} | — | February 20, 2009 | Kitt Peak | Spacewatch | · | 820 m | MPC; JPL |
| 685091 | 2009 DL_{159} | — | February 21, 2009 | Kitt Peak | Spacewatch | KOR | 990 m | MPC; JPL |
| 685092 | 2009 DS_{159} | — | February 28, 2009 | Mount Lemmon | Mount Lemmon Survey | KOR | 1.1 km | MPC; JPL |
| 685093 | 2009 DT_{159} | — | February 19, 2009 | Kitt Peak | Spacewatch | · | 1.5 km | MPC; JPL |
| 685094 | 2009 DB_{160} | — | February 20, 2009 | Kitt Peak | Spacewatch | · | 1.3 km | MPC; JPL |
| 685095 | 2009 DF_{161} | — | February 20, 2009 | Kitt Peak | Spacewatch | · | 1.3 km | MPC; JPL |
| 685096 | 2009 EU_{6} | — | January 31, 2009 | Mount Lemmon | Mount Lemmon Survey | · | 2.1 km | MPC; JPL |
| 685097 | 2009 EW_{6} | — | September 15, 2006 | Kitt Peak | Spacewatch | · | 1.9 km | MPC; JPL |
| 685098 | 2009 EL_{7} | — | March 2, 2009 | Kitt Peak | Spacewatch | · | 1.2 km | MPC; JPL |
| 685099 | 2009 EQ_{7} | — | May 26, 2006 | Mount Lemmon | Mount Lemmon Survey | · | 990 m | MPC; JPL |
| 685100 | 2009 EX_{9} | — | March 1, 2009 | Kitt Peak | Spacewatch | · | 1.2 km | MPC; JPL |

== 685101–685200 ==
back to top

| Designation | | | Discovery | | | Properties | | Ref |
| Permanent | Provisional | Named after | Date | Site | Discoverer(s) | Category | Diam. | Ref |
|---|---|---|---|---|---|---|---|---|
| 685101 | 2009 EU_{31} | — | February 1, 2009 | Kitt Peak | Spacewatch | · | 2.4 km | MPC; JPL |
| 685102 | 2009 EH_{33} | — | September 27, 2016 | Haleakala | Pan-STARRS 1 | · | 1.8 km | MPC; JPL |
| 685103 | 2009 EO_{33} | — | March 3, 2009 | Kitt Peak | Spacewatch | · | 1.3 km | MPC; JPL |
| 685104 | 2009 EJ_{34} | — | August 26, 2011 | Kitt Peak | Spacewatch | · | 1.4 km | MPC; JPL |
| 685105 | 2009 EX_{35} | — | September 28, 2011 | Mount Lemmon | Mount Lemmon Survey | · | 1.8 km | MPC; JPL |
| 685106 | 2009 EW_{36} | — | August 30, 2016 | Haleakala | Pan-STARRS 1 | · | 1.7 km | MPC; JPL |
| 685107 | 2009 ED_{37} | — | September 26, 2016 | Haleakala | Pan-STARRS 1 | KOR | 970 m | MPC; JPL |
| 685108 | 2009 EC_{39} | — | March 1, 2009 | Kitt Peak | Spacewatch | MAS | 600 m | MPC; JPL |
| 685109 | 2009 EF_{39} | — | March 3, 2009 | Mount Lemmon | Mount Lemmon Survey | · | 830 m | MPC; JPL |
| 685110 | 2009 EJ_{40} | — | March 3, 2009 | Mount Lemmon | Mount Lemmon Survey | · | 1.6 km | MPC; JPL |
| 685111 | 2009 EL_{40} | — | March 3, 2009 | Kitt Peak | Spacewatch | · | 1.4 km | MPC; JPL |
| 685112 | 2009 EM_{41} | — | March 3, 2009 | Mount Lemmon | Mount Lemmon Survey | · | 1.6 km | MPC; JPL |
| 685113 | 2009 FN_{2} | — | March 17, 2009 | Kitt Peak | Spacewatch | · | 960 m | MPC; JPL |
| 685114 | 2009 FK_{6} | — | March 16, 2009 | Kitt Peak | Spacewatch | · | 1.5 km | MPC; JPL |
| 685115 | 2009 FY_{9} | — | March 3, 2009 | Kitt Peak | Spacewatch | · | 760 m | MPC; JPL |
| 685116 | 2009 FT_{10} | — | March 18, 2009 | Mount Lemmon | Mount Lemmon Survey | 615 | 1.0 km | MPC; JPL |
| 685117 | 2009 FS_{12} | — | March 3, 2009 | Mount Lemmon | Mount Lemmon Survey | NAE | 1.8 km | MPC; JPL |
| 685118 | 2009 FW_{14} | — | March 16, 2009 | Kitt Peak | Spacewatch | · | 540 m | MPC; JPL |
| 685119 | 2009 FV_{15} | — | March 2, 2009 | Kitt Peak | Spacewatch | NYS | 900 m | MPC; JPL |
| 685120 | 2009 FA_{20} | — | August 19, 2001 | Cerro Tololo | Deep Ecliptic Survey | AEO | 1.2 km | MPC; JPL |
| 685121 | 2009 FK_{20} | — | March 18, 2009 | Catalina | CSS | · | 1.5 km | MPC; JPL |
| 685122 | 2009 FR_{29} | — | March 20, 2009 | Pla D'Arguines | R. Ferrando | · | 980 m | MPC; JPL |
| 685123 | 2009 FW_{43} | — | March 29, 2009 | Bergisch Gladbach | W. Bickel | · | 1.7 km | MPC; JPL |
| 685124 | 2009 FQ_{46} | — | May 10, 2005 | Kitt Peak | Spacewatch | MRX | 930 m | MPC; JPL |
| 685125 | 2009 FT_{51} | — | December 4, 2007 | Mount Lemmon | Mount Lemmon Survey | AGN | 1.3 km | MPC; JPL |
| 685126 | 2009 FU_{53} | — | March 29, 2009 | Mount Lemmon | Mount Lemmon Survey | · | 1.9 km | MPC; JPL |
| 685127 | 2009 FJ_{55} | — | February 4, 2009 | Mount Lemmon | Mount Lemmon Survey | · | 810 m | MPC; JPL |
| 685128 | 2009 FJ_{66} | — | March 21, 2009 | Kitt Peak | Spacewatch | · | 780 m | MPC; JPL |
| 685129 | 2009 FU_{71} | — | March 16, 2009 | Kitt Peak | Spacewatch | · | 1.7 km | MPC; JPL |
| 685130 | 2009 FB_{80} | — | March 29, 2001 | Kitt Peak | Spacewatch | · | 1.0 km | MPC; JPL |
| 685131 | 2009 FT_{80} | — | July 14, 2015 | Haleakala | Pan-STARRS 1 | · | 1.4 km | MPC; JPL |
| 685132 | 2009 FS_{82} | — | October 18, 2011 | Kitt Peak | Spacewatch | · | 780 m | MPC; JPL |
| 685133 | 2009 FG_{86} | — | October 9, 2012 | Haleakala | Pan-STARRS 1 | · | 3.7 km | MPC; JPL |
| 685134 | 2009 FE_{87} | — | February 28, 2014 | Haleakala | Pan-STARRS 1 | · | 1.4 km | MPC; JPL |
| 685135 | 2009 FT_{87} | — | March 28, 2014 | Mount Lemmon | Mount Lemmon Survey | · | 1.5 km | MPC; JPL |
| 685136 | 2009 FH_{89} | — | October 29, 2017 | Haleakala | Pan-STARRS 1 | EOS | 1.4 km | MPC; JPL |
| 685137 | 2009 FO_{89} | — | September 19, 2011 | Mount Lemmon | Mount Lemmon Survey | · | 1.8 km | MPC; JPL |
| 685138 | 2009 FG_{90} | — | March 26, 2009 | Mount Lemmon | Mount Lemmon Survey | · | 1.7 km | MPC; JPL |
| 685139 | 2009 FT_{91} | — | March 19, 2009 | Kitt Peak | Spacewatch | PHO | 700 m | MPC; JPL |
| 685140 | 2009 FQ_{92} | — | March 31, 2009 | Kitt Peak | Spacewatch | NYS | 810 m | MPC; JPL |
| 685141 | 2009 FR_{92} | — | March 24, 2009 | Mount Lemmon | Mount Lemmon Survey | · | 860 m | MPC; JPL |
| 685142 | 2009 FY_{92} | — | March 21, 2009 | Kitt Peak | Spacewatch | · | 1.5 km | MPC; JPL |
| 685143 | 2009 FE_{93} | — | March 22, 2009 | Mount Lemmon | Mount Lemmon Survey | · | 1.4 km | MPC; JPL |
| 685144 | 2009 FH_{93} | — | March 22, 2009 | Mount Lemmon | Mount Lemmon Survey | · | 870 m | MPC; JPL |
| 685145 | 2009 FA_{94} | — | March 3, 2009 | Kitt Peak | Spacewatch | V | 480 m | MPC; JPL |
| 685146 | 2009 FC_{94} | — | March 31, 2009 | Mount Lemmon | Mount Lemmon Survey | · | 940 m | MPC; JPL |
| 685147 | 2009 GY_{2} | — | April 2, 2009 | Zadko | Zadko | · | 1.1 km | MPC; JPL |
| 685148 | 2009 GU_{6} | — | April 1, 2009 | Mount Lemmon | Mount Lemmon Survey | DOR | 2.4 km | MPC; JPL |
| 685149 | 2009 GV_{6} | — | September 10, 2010 | Kitt Peak | Spacewatch | · | 760 m | MPC; JPL |
| 685150 | 2009 GH_{7} | — | October 17, 2010 | Mount Lemmon | Mount Lemmon Survey | · | 780 m | MPC; JPL |
| 685151 | 2009 GS_{8} | — | March 8, 2014 | Mount Lemmon | Mount Lemmon Survey | · | 1.7 km | MPC; JPL |
| 685152 | 2009 GA_{9} | — | April 1, 2009 | Mount Lemmon | Mount Lemmon Survey | PHO | 790 m | MPC; JPL |
| 685153 | 2009 GP_{9} | — | April 2, 2009 | Kitt Peak | Spacewatch | · | 960 m | MPC; JPL |
| 685154 | 2009 HN_{13} | — | February 29, 2004 | Kitt Peak | Spacewatch | AEO | 1.1 km | MPC; JPL |
| 685155 | 2009 HV_{23} | — | November 18, 2007 | Kitt Peak | Spacewatch | AEO | 980 m | MPC; JPL |
| 685156 | 2009 HX_{25} | — | April 18, 2009 | Kitt Peak | Spacewatch | MAS | 660 m | MPC; JPL |
| 685157 | 2009 HU_{26} | — | April 18, 2009 | Kitt Peak | Spacewatch | 3:2 | 3.5 km | MPC; JPL |
| 685158 | 2009 HG_{31} | — | April 2, 2009 | Kitt Peak | Spacewatch | · | 1.2 km | MPC; JPL |
| 685159 | 2009 HQ_{31} | — | April 19, 2009 | Kitt Peak | Spacewatch | · | 1.8 km | MPC; JPL |
| 685160 | 2009 HM_{33} | — | November 5, 2007 | Mount Lemmon | Mount Lemmon Survey | NYS | 910 m | MPC; JPL |
| 685161 | 2009 HE_{41} | — | April 20, 2009 | Kitt Peak | Spacewatch | MAS | 470 m | MPC; JPL |
| 685162 | 2009 HY_{42} | — | May 8, 2002 | Kitt Peak | Spacewatch | · | 810 m | MPC; JPL |
| 685163 | 2009 HW_{49} | — | April 2, 2009 | Mount Lemmon | Mount Lemmon Survey | · | 1.4 km | MPC; JPL |
| 685164 | 2009 HY_{49} | — | April 21, 2009 | Kitt Peak | Spacewatch | · | 1.7 km | MPC; JPL |
| 685165 | 2009 HN_{51} | — | April 21, 2009 | Kitt Peak | Spacewatch | · | 1.9 km | MPC; JPL |
| 685166 | 2009 HQ_{61} | — | March 10, 2005 | Mount Lemmon | Mount Lemmon Survey | · | 770 m | MPC; JPL |
| 685167 | 2009 HS_{61} | — | April 20, 2009 | Mount Lemmon | Mount Lemmon Survey | · | 1.3 km | MPC; JPL |
| 685168 | 2009 HH_{62} | — | April 21, 2009 | Mount Lemmon | Mount Lemmon Survey | · | 1.4 km | MPC; JPL |
| 685169 | 2009 HB_{63} | — | April 22, 2009 | Mount Lemmon | Mount Lemmon Survey | MAS | 570 m | MPC; JPL |
| 685170 | 2009 HP_{69} | — | April 22, 2009 | Mount Lemmon | Mount Lemmon Survey | V | 510 m | MPC; JPL |
| 685171 | 2009 HD_{71} | — | April 22, 2009 | Mount Lemmon | Mount Lemmon Survey | · | 1.6 km | MPC; JPL |
| 685172 | 2009 HK_{71} | — | September 30, 2006 | Mount Lemmon | Mount Lemmon Survey | KOR | 1.3 km | MPC; JPL |
| 685173 | 2009 HB_{81} | — | April 29, 2009 | Kitt Peak | Spacewatch | · | 2.4 km | MPC; JPL |
| 685174 | 2009 HQ_{81} | — | April 9, 2005 | Kitt Peak | Spacewatch | · | 970 m | MPC; JPL |
| 685175 | 2009 HS_{86} | — | March 29, 2009 | Kitt Peak | Spacewatch | · | 1.7 km | MPC; JPL |
| 685176 | 2009 HX_{87} | — | April 30, 2009 | Mount Lemmon | Mount Lemmon Survey | AGN | 950 m | MPC; JPL |
| 685177 | 2009 HY_{87} | — | March 2, 2009 | Mount Lemmon | Mount Lemmon Survey | · | 1.4 km | MPC; JPL |
| 685178 | 2009 HA_{88} | — | April 30, 2009 | Kitt Peak | Spacewatch | · | 1.9 km | MPC; JPL |
| 685179 | 2009 HO_{93} | — | January 17, 2008 | Mount Lemmon | Mount Lemmon Survey | · | 1.8 km | MPC; JPL |
| 685180 | 2009 HS_{100} | — | April 30, 2009 | Kitt Peak | Spacewatch | · | 1.5 km | MPC; JPL |
| 685181 | 2009 HT_{103} | — | April 19, 2009 | Kitt Peak | Spacewatch | · | 1.2 km | MPC; JPL |
| 685182 | 2009 HA_{105} | — | April 18, 2009 | Mount Lemmon | Mount Lemmon Survey | (6769) | 990 m | MPC; JPL |
| 685183 | 2009 HB_{110} | — | December 30, 2013 | Kitt Peak | Spacewatch | · | 3.3 km | MPC; JPL |
| 685184 | 2009 HR_{110} | — | April 22, 2009 | Mount Lemmon | Mount Lemmon Survey | · | 1.0 km | MPC; JPL |
| 685185 | 2009 HG_{111} | — | December 29, 2011 | Mount Lemmon | Mount Lemmon Survey | · | 1.9 km | MPC; JPL |
| 685186 | 2009 HC_{112} | — | October 12, 2010 | Mount Lemmon | Mount Lemmon Survey | · | 1.2 km | MPC; JPL |
| 685187 | 2009 HK_{112} | — | August 30, 2016 | Mount Lemmon | Mount Lemmon Survey | · | 1.5 km | MPC; JPL |
| 685188 | 2009 HJ_{113} | — | October 15, 2012 | Mount Lemmon | Mount Lemmon Survey | LIX | 2.7 km | MPC; JPL |
| 685189 | 2009 HZ_{113} | — | October 10, 2015 | Haleakala | Pan-STARRS 1 | · | 1.4 km | MPC; JPL |
| 685190 | 2009 HT_{114} | — | October 31, 2011 | Kitt Peak | Spacewatch | · | 1.2 km | MPC; JPL |
| 685191 | 2009 HP_{115} | — | February 13, 2008 | Kitt Peak | Spacewatch | 3:2 | 3.7 km | MPC; JPL |
| 685192 | 2009 HH_{116} | — | February 28, 2014 | Haleakala | Pan-STARRS 1 | · | 2.6 km | MPC; JPL |
| 685193 | 2009 HU_{118} | — | March 29, 2009 | Kitt Peak | Spacewatch | · | 990 m | MPC; JPL |
| 685194 | 2009 HA_{119} | — | September 24, 2011 | Haleakala | Pan-STARRS 1 | · | 1.6 km | MPC; JPL |
| 685195 | 2009 HV_{121} | — | April 20, 2009 | Mount Lemmon | Mount Lemmon Survey | · | 810 m | MPC; JPL |
| 685196 | 2009 HW_{121} | — | February 5, 2013 | Calar Alto | Mottola, S. | · | 1.4 km | MPC; JPL |
| 685197 | 2009 HE_{126} | — | April 20, 2009 | Kitt Peak | Spacewatch | · | 990 m | MPC; JPL |
| 685198 | 2009 HQ_{127} | — | December 8, 2012 | Mount Lemmon | Mount Lemmon Survey | · | 1.7 km | MPC; JPL |
| 685199 | 2009 JY_{4} | — | May 13, 2009 | Kitt Peak | Spacewatch | HNS | 890 m | MPC; JPL |
| 685200 | 2009 JA_{11} | — | April 18, 2009 | Kitt Peak | Spacewatch | · | 1.7 km | MPC; JPL |

== 685201–685300 ==
back to top

| Designation | | | Discovery | | | Properties | | Ref |
| Permanent | Provisional | Named after | Date | Site | Discoverer(s) | Category | Diam. | Ref |
|---|---|---|---|---|---|---|---|---|
| 685201 | 2009 JJ_{11} | — | May 15, 2009 | Kitt Peak | Spacewatch | · | 1.7 km | MPC; JPL |
| 685202 | 2009 JB_{14} | — | April 4, 2008 | Kitt Peak | Spacewatch | L5 | 8.6 km | MPC; JPL |
| 685203 | 2009 JC_{14} | — | September 17, 2006 | Kitt Peak | Spacewatch | · | 730 m | MPC; JPL |
| 685204 | 2009 JE_{14} | — | May 1, 2009 | Cerro Burek | Burek, Cerro | · | 1.6 km | MPC; JPL |
| 685205 | 2009 JY_{15} | — | March 19, 2009 | Mount Lemmon | Mount Lemmon Survey | · | 1.3 km | MPC; JPL |
| 685206 | 2009 JQ_{16} | — | July 3, 2003 | Kitt Peak | Spacewatch | · | 1.0 km | MPC; JPL |
| 685207 | 2009 JV_{19} | — | May 22, 2015 | Haleakala | Pan-STARRS 1 | · | 2.6 km | MPC; JPL |
| 685208 | 2009 JC_{20} | — | October 26, 2011 | Haleakala | Pan-STARRS 1 | EOS | 1.4 km | MPC; JPL |
| 685209 | 2009 JH_{20} | — | May 4, 2009 | Kitt Peak | Spacewatch | · | 750 m | MPC; JPL |
| 685210 | 2009 JQ_{23} | — | October 10, 2016 | Haleakala | Pan-STARRS 1 | · | 1.6 km | MPC; JPL |
| 685211 | 2009 KU_{2} | — | May 18, 2009 | Sierra Stars | Dillon, W. G. | · | 1.2 km | MPC; JPL |
| 685212 | 2009 KY_{5} | — | April 20, 2009 | Kitt Peak | Spacewatch | · | 1.4 km | MPC; JPL |
| 685213 | 2009 KZ_{9} | — | April 22, 2009 | Mount Lemmon | Mount Lemmon Survey | · | 1.1 km | MPC; JPL |
| 685214 | 2009 KW_{14} | — | May 26, 2009 | Catalina | CSS | PHO | 750 m | MPC; JPL |
| 685215 | 2009 KZ_{20} | — | May 29, 2009 | Mount Lemmon | Mount Lemmon Survey | EOS | 1.3 km | MPC; JPL |
| 685216 | 2009 KD_{21} | — | September 24, 2006 | Kitt Peak | Spacewatch | NYS | 850 m | MPC; JPL |
| 685217 | 2009 KK_{21} | — | October 21, 2006 | Mount Lemmon | Mount Lemmon Survey | · | 1.8 km | MPC; JPL |
| 685218 | 2009 KL_{21} | — | February 8, 2008 | Kitt Peak | Spacewatch | · | 1.7 km | MPC; JPL |
| 685219 | 2009 KM_{25} | — | May 28, 2009 | Mount Lemmon | Mount Lemmon Survey | · | 670 m | MPC; JPL |
| 685220 | 2009 KU_{25} | — | May 28, 2009 | Mount Lemmon | Mount Lemmon Survey | · | 1.8 km | MPC; JPL |
| 685221 | 2009 KD_{27} | — | December 13, 2006 | Mount Lemmon | Mount Lemmon Survey | KOR | 1.3 km | MPC; JPL |
| 685222 | 2009 KV_{38} | — | May 27, 2009 | Mount Lemmon | Mount Lemmon Survey | · | 2.0 km | MPC; JPL |
| 685223 | 2009 LJ_{3} | — | June 12, 2009 | Kitt Peak | Spacewatch | L5 | 9.8 km | MPC; JPL |
| 685224 | 2009 LN_{3} | — | June 12, 2009 | Kitt Peak | Spacewatch | L5 | 9.2 km | MPC; JPL |
| 685225 | 2009 LE_{8} | — | February 16, 2016 | Mount Lemmon | Mount Lemmon Survey | · | 830 m | MPC; JPL |
| 685226 | 2009 MY | — | May 25, 2020 | Mount Lemmon | Mount Lemmon Survey | · | 2.2 km | MPC; JPL |
| 685227 | 2009 MN_{3} | — | May 17, 2009 | Kitt Peak | Spacewatch | · | 2.2 km | MPC; JPL |
| 685228 | 2009 MU_{7} | — | June 24, 2009 | Cerro Burek | Burek, Cerro | · | 1.0 km | MPC; JPL |
| 685229 | 2009 MG_{11} | — | May 26, 2014 | Haleakala | Pan-STARRS 1 | · | 2.4 km | MPC; JPL |
| 685230 | 2009 MU_{11} | — | October 5, 2014 | Mount Lemmon | Mount Lemmon Survey | PHO | 1.0 km | MPC; JPL |
| 685231 | 2009 MQ_{12} | — | June 22, 2009 | Mount Lemmon | Mount Lemmon Survey | · | 2.3 km | MPC; JPL |
| 685232 | 2009 NN | — | June 15, 2009 | Mount Lemmon | Mount Lemmon Survey | · | 1.4 km | MPC; JPL |
| 685233 | 2009 OO_{11} | — | September 11, 2004 | Kitt Peak | Spacewatch | · | 1.3 km | MPC; JPL |
| 685234 | 2009 OR_{12} | — | November 28, 2005 | Kitt Peak | Spacewatch | · | 2.8 km | MPC; JPL |
| 685235 | 2009 OP_{15} | — | September 16, 2003 | Palomar | NEAT | · | 4.4 km | MPC; JPL |
| 685236 | 2009 OT_{18} | — | July 28, 2009 | Kitt Peak | Spacewatch | · | 1.6 km | MPC; JPL |
| 685237 | 2009 OG_{19} | — | February 23, 2007 | Kitt Peak | Spacewatch | EOS | 1.4 km | MPC; JPL |
| 685238 | 2009 OH_{26} | — | July 27, 2009 | Kitt Peak | Spacewatch | · | 1.9 km | MPC; JPL |
| 685239 | 2009 OU_{26} | — | April 11, 2016 | Haleakala | Pan-STARRS 1 | · | 1.3 km | MPC; JPL |
| 685240 | 2009 OE_{29} | — | July 29, 2009 | Kitt Peak | Spacewatch | · | 1.9 km | MPC; JPL |
| 685241 | 2009 OL_{29} | — | July 28, 2009 | Kitt Peak | Spacewatch | · | 2.7 km | MPC; JPL |
| 685242 | 2009 OM_{30} | — | July 28, 2009 | Kitt Peak | Spacewatch | · | 1.2 km | MPC; JPL |
| 685243 | 2009 PK_{6} | — | August 15, 2009 | Kitt Peak | Spacewatch | VER | 2.3 km | MPC; JPL |
| 685244 | 2009 PW_{7} | — | August 15, 2009 | Kitt Peak | Spacewatch | · | 980 m | MPC; JPL |
| 685245 | 2009 PB_{20} | — | August 15, 2009 | Kitt Peak | Spacewatch | · | 1.9 km | MPC; JPL |
| 685246 | 2009 PR_{21} | — | August 15, 2009 | Kitt Peak | Spacewatch | · | 2.5 km | MPC; JPL |
| 685247 | 2009 PS_{21} | — | August 15, 2009 | Kitt Peak | Spacewatch | · | 2.4 km | MPC; JPL |
| 685248 | 2009 PP_{22} | — | May 7, 2014 | Haleakala | Pan-STARRS 1 | · | 2.0 km | MPC; JPL |
| 685249 | 2009 PP_{23} | — | August 10, 2009 | Kitt Peak | Spacewatch | · | 2.4 km | MPC; JPL |
| 685250 | 2009 PW_{23} | — | August 1, 2009 | Kitt Peak | Spacewatch | · | 2.1 km | MPC; JPL |
| 685251 | 2009 QS_{2} | — | August 16, 2009 | Kitt Peak | Spacewatch | EOS | 1.4 km | MPC; JPL |
| 685252 | 2009 QU_{6} | — | August 18, 2009 | Vallemare Borbona | V. S. Casulli | HYG | 2.0 km | MPC; JPL |
| 685253 | 2009 QD_{7} | — | August 16, 2009 | Punaauia | Teamo, N. | · | 830 m | MPC; JPL |
| 685254 | 2009 QV_{10} | — | August 18, 2009 | Kitt Peak | Spacewatch | · | 1.3 km | MPC; JPL |
| 685255 | 2009 QD_{16} | — | August 16, 2009 | Kitt Peak | Spacewatch | EOS | 1.6 km | MPC; JPL |
| 685256 | 2009 QG_{17} | — | January 7, 2006 | Mount Lemmon | Mount Lemmon Survey | · | 2.3 km | MPC; JPL |
| 685257 | 2009 QK_{17} | — | June 13, 2005 | Mount Lemmon | Mount Lemmon Survey | · | 1.2 km | MPC; JPL |
| 685258 | 2009 QN_{17} | — | August 17, 2009 | Kitt Peak | Spacewatch | · | 2.4 km | MPC; JPL |
| 685259 | 2009 QZ_{18} | — | December 12, 2006 | Mount Lemmon | Mount Lemmon Survey | · | 1.2 km | MPC; JPL |
| 685260 | 2009 QW_{20} | — | July 27, 2009 | Kitt Peak | Spacewatch | MAS | 750 m | MPC; JPL |
| 685261 | 2009 QX_{20} | — | August 19, 2009 | La Sagra | OAM | · | 920 m | MPC; JPL |
| 685262 | 2009 QX_{27} | — | June 24, 2009 | Mount Lemmon | Mount Lemmon Survey | · | 2.9 km | MPC; JPL |
| 685263 | 2009 QS_{29} | — | July 26, 2009 | Zelenchukskaya Stn | Gabdeev, M., T. V. Krjačko | · | 2.0 km | MPC; JPL |
| 685264 | 2009 QB_{31} | — | June 2, 2009 | Mauna Kea | D. J. Tholen, M. Micheli | · | 3.0 km | MPC; JPL |
| 685265 | 2009 QH_{36} | — | August 27, 2009 | Modra | Gajdoš, S., Világi, J. | EOS | 1.6 km | MPC; JPL |
| 685266 | 2009 QS_{45} | — | August 26, 2009 | Catalina | CSS | · | 2.1 km | MPC; JPL |
| 685267 | 2009 QO_{46} | — | September 16, 1998 | Kitt Peak | Spacewatch | · | 1.1 km | MPC; JPL |
| 685268 | 2009 QR_{48} | — | August 27, 2009 | Kitt Peak | Spacewatch | VER | 2.0 km | MPC; JPL |
| 685269 | 2009 QU_{48} | — | August 27, 2009 | Kitt Peak | Spacewatch | EOS | 1.7 km | MPC; JPL |
| 685270 | 2009 QL_{51} | — | August 15, 2009 | Kitt Peak | Spacewatch | · | 3.3 km | MPC; JPL |
| 685271 | 2009 QS_{51} | — | August 26, 2009 | Catalina | CSS | · | 2.1 km | MPC; JPL |
| 685272 | 2009 QB_{52} | — | August 18, 2009 | Catalina | CSS | · | 2.6 km | MPC; JPL |
| 685273 | 2009 QU_{52} | — | August 20, 2009 | Kitt Peak | Spacewatch | · | 2.5 km | MPC; JPL |
| 685274 | 2009 QL_{57} | — | July 29, 2009 | Catalina | CSS | EUN | 1.4 km | MPC; JPL |
| 685275 | 2009 QK_{61} | — | August 28, 2009 | Catalina | CSS | · | 1.0 km | MPC; JPL |
| 685276 | 2009 QB_{62} | — | August 28, 2009 | Kitt Peak | Spacewatch | · | 2.2 km | MPC; JPL |
| 685277 | 2009 QO_{62} | — | August 16, 2009 | Kitt Peak | Spacewatch | · | 1.6 km | MPC; JPL |
| 685278 | 2009 QE_{66} | — | August 19, 2009 | Kitt Peak | Spacewatch | · | 1.9 km | MPC; JPL |
| 685279 | 2009 QL_{66} | — | August 18, 2009 | Kitt Peak | Spacewatch | · | 1.0 km | MPC; JPL |
| 685280 | 2009 QW_{67} | — | January 4, 2016 | Haleakala | Pan-STARRS 1 | H | 420 m | MPC; JPL |
| 685281 | 2009 QX_{67} | — | June 2, 2014 | Haleakala | Pan-STARRS 1 | · | 2.2 km | MPC; JPL |
| 685282 | 2009 QN_{73} | — | August 29, 2009 | Kitt Peak | Spacewatch | · | 2.7 km | MPC; JPL |
| 685283 | 2009 QZ_{74} | — | August 18, 2009 | Kitt Peak | Spacewatch | · | 1.8 km | MPC; JPL |
| 685284 | 2009 QH_{75} | — | August 27, 2009 | Kitt Peak | Spacewatch | MAS | 590 m | MPC; JPL |
| 685285 | 2009 QA_{76} | — | August 27, 2009 | Kitt Peak | Spacewatch | · | 2.0 km | MPC; JPL |
| 685286 | 2009 QB_{76} | — | August 20, 2009 | Kitt Peak | Spacewatch | · | 1.7 km | MPC; JPL |
| 685287 | 2009 QL_{76} | — | August 16, 2009 | Kitt Peak | Spacewatch | EOS | 1.6 km | MPC; JPL |
| 685288 | 2009 QV_{77} | — | March 12, 2007 | Mount Lemmon | Mount Lemmon Survey | · | 2.2 km | MPC; JPL |
| 685289 | 2009 QX_{77} | — | August 17, 2009 | Kitt Peak | Spacewatch | VER | 2.0 km | MPC; JPL |
| 685290 | 2009 QN_{79} | — | August 28, 2009 | Kitt Peak | Spacewatch | · | 2.6 km | MPC; JPL |
| 685291 | 2009 QC_{80} | — | August 27, 2009 | Kitt Peak | Spacewatch | · | 2.2 km | MPC; JPL |
| 685292 | 2009 RD | — | August 15, 2009 | Catalina | CSS | · | 3.0 km | MPC; JPL |
| 685293 | 2009 RO_{1} | — | September 11, 2009 | La Sagra | OAM | EUN | 1.1 km | MPC; JPL |
| 685294 | 2009 RE_{9} | — | September 12, 2009 | Kitt Peak | Spacewatch | · | 1.9 km | MPC; JPL |
| 685295 | 2009 RY_{13} | — | March 26, 2007 | Mount Lemmon | Mount Lemmon Survey | HYG | 2.6 km | MPC; JPL |
| 685296 | 2009 RZ_{14} | — | September 12, 2009 | Kitt Peak | Spacewatch | · | 1.9 km | MPC; JPL |
| 685297 | 2009 RK_{15} | — | September 12, 2009 | Kitt Peak | Spacewatch | · | 2.8 km | MPC; JPL |
| 685298 | 2009 RC_{17} | — | September 12, 2009 | Kitt Peak | Spacewatch | T_{j} (2.99) · 3:2 | 4.6 km | MPC; JPL |
| 685299 | 2009 RP_{18} | — | September 12, 2009 | Siding Spring | SSS | · | 1.2 km | MPC; JPL |
| 685300 | 2009 RR_{19} | — | September 14, 2009 | Kachina | Hobart, J. | · | 2.0 km | MPC; JPL |

== 685301–685400 ==
back to top

| Designation | | | Discovery | | | Properties | | Ref |
| Permanent | Provisional | Named after | Date | Site | Discoverer(s) | Category | Diam. | Ref |
|---|---|---|---|---|---|---|---|---|
| 685301 | 2009 RY_{20} | — | September 14, 2009 | Kitt Peak | Spacewatch | KOR | 1.1 km | MPC; JPL |
| 685302 | 2009 RR_{21} | — | September 15, 2009 | Kitt Peak | Spacewatch | · | 2.1 km | MPC; JPL |
| 685303 | 2009 RS_{21} | — | January 8, 2006 | Kitt Peak | Spacewatch | · | 2.3 km | MPC; JPL |
| 685304 | 2009 RW_{25} | — | September 15, 2009 | Kitt Peak | Spacewatch | VER | 2.4 km | MPC; JPL |
| 685305 | 2009 RY_{25} | — | September 14, 2009 | Needville | C. Sexton, J. Dellinger | · | 2.5 km | MPC; JPL |
| 685306 | 2009 RU_{36} | — | September 15, 2009 | Kitt Peak | Spacewatch | · | 2.4 km | MPC; JPL |
| 685307 | 2009 RU_{38} | — | October 7, 2005 | Kitt Peak | Spacewatch | (5) | 950 m | MPC; JPL |
| 685308 | 2009 RK_{39} | — | September 15, 2009 | Kitt Peak | Spacewatch | · | 2.6 km | MPC; JPL |
| 685309 | 2009 RX_{39} | — | September 15, 2009 | Kitt Peak | Spacewatch | · | 2.5 km | MPC; JPL |
| 685310 | 2009 RB_{53} | — | September 15, 2009 | Kitt Peak | Spacewatch | · | 2.8 km | MPC; JPL |
| 685311 | 2009 RJ_{71} | — | September 15, 2009 | Kitt Peak | Spacewatch | H | 370 m | MPC; JPL |
| 685312 | 2009 RG_{73} | — | September 15, 2009 | Catalina | CSS | · | 3.4 km | MPC; JPL |
| 685313 | 2009 RP_{75} | — | September 13, 2009 | Socorro | LINEAR | · | 2.5 km | MPC; JPL |
| 685314 | 2009 RH_{77} | — | July 27, 2014 | Haleakala | Pan-STARRS 1 | EOS | 1.5 km | MPC; JPL |
| 685315 | 2009 RN_{77} | — | June 24, 2014 | Haleakala | Pan-STARRS 1 | VER | 2.0 km | MPC; JPL |
| 685316 | 2009 RU_{77} | — | September 14, 2009 | Kitt Peak | Spacewatch | MAR | 730 m | MPC; JPL |
| 685317 | 2009 RL_{79} | — | March 10, 2018 | Haleakala | Pan-STARRS 1 | VER | 1.9 km | MPC; JPL |
| 685318 | 2009 RS_{79} | — | June 12, 2013 | Haleakala | Pan-STARRS 1 | 615 | 1.5 km | MPC; JPL |
| 685319 | 2009 RL_{80} | — | September 12, 2009 | Kitt Peak | Spacewatch | VER | 2.0 km | MPC; JPL |
| 685320 | 2009 RW_{80} | — | September 15, 2009 | Kitt Peak | Spacewatch | V | 510 m | MPC; JPL |
| 685321 | 2009 RX_{81} | — | September 15, 2009 | Kitt Peak | Spacewatch | · | 2.4 km | MPC; JPL |
| 685322 | 2009 SC_{4} | — | September 16, 2009 | Mount Lemmon | Mount Lemmon Survey | · | 910 m | MPC; JPL |
| 685323 | 2009 ST_{4} | — | December 1, 2005 | Kitt Peak | Spacewatch | EMA | 3.0 km | MPC; JPL |
| 685324 | 2009 SA_{5} | — | September 16, 2009 | Mount Lemmon | Mount Lemmon Survey | · | 1.1 km | MPC; JPL |
| 685325 | 2009 SR_{5} | — | September 16, 2009 | Mount Lemmon | Mount Lemmon Survey | · | 1.8 km | MPC; JPL |
| 685326 | 2009 SE_{6} | — | September 16, 2009 | Mount Lemmon | Mount Lemmon Survey | VER | 2.2 km | MPC; JPL |
| 685327 | 2009 SM_{7} | — | September 16, 2009 | Mount Lemmon | Mount Lemmon Survey | · | 2.7 km | MPC; JPL |
| 685328 | 2009 SK_{8} | — | September 16, 2009 | Mount Lemmon | Mount Lemmon Survey | VER | 2.2 km | MPC; JPL |
| 685329 | 2009 SN_{9} | — | September 16, 2009 | Kitt Peak | Spacewatch | · | 1.3 km | MPC; JPL |
| 685330 | 2009 SX_{10} | — | November 1, 2006 | Kitt Peak | Spacewatch | · | 650 m | MPC; JPL |
| 685331 | 2009 SJ_{12} | — | June 2, 2008 | Mount Lemmon | Mount Lemmon Survey | · | 1.9 km | MPC; JPL |
| 685332 | 2009 SC_{18} | — | September 21, 2009 | Mount Lemmon | Mount Lemmon Survey | · | 1.9 km | MPC; JPL |
| 685333 | 2009 SD_{18} | — | September 17, 2009 | La Silla | A. Galád | · | 3.1 km | MPC; JPL |
| 685334 | 2009 SX_{18} | — | September 17, 2009 | Mount Lemmon | Mount Lemmon Survey | · | 2.0 km | MPC; JPL |
| 685335 | 2009 SO_{22} | — | September 16, 2009 | Kitt Peak | Spacewatch | · | 1.6 km | MPC; JPL |
| 685336 | 2009 SF_{27} | — | September 16, 2009 | Kitt Peak | Spacewatch | · | 2.2 km | MPC; JPL |
| 685337 | 2009 SR_{28} | — | September 16, 2009 | Kitt Peak | Spacewatch | KOR | 1.1 km | MPC; JPL |
| 685338 | 2009 SO_{30} | — | September 16, 2009 | Kitt Peak | Spacewatch | · | 2.1 km | MPC; JPL |
| 685339 | 2009 SH_{32} | — | September 16, 2009 | Mount Lemmon | Mount Lemmon Survey | · | 2.3 km | MPC; JPL |
| 685340 | 2009 SL_{35} | — | November 9, 1999 | Kitt Peak | Spacewatch | · | 1.7 km | MPC; JPL |
| 685341 | 2009 SE_{36} | — | March 11, 2007 | Mount Lemmon | Mount Lemmon Survey | (5) | 890 m | MPC; JPL |
| 685342 | 2009 SV_{37} | — | September 16, 2009 | Kitt Peak | Spacewatch | HYG | 2.2 km | MPC; JPL |
| 685343 | 2009 SU_{41} | — | September 16, 2009 | Mount Lemmon | Mount Lemmon Survey | · | 2.2 km | MPC; JPL |
| 685344 | 2009 SB_{42} | — | September 16, 2009 | Mount Lemmon | Mount Lemmon Survey | · | 2.2 km | MPC; JPL |
| 685345 | 2009 SN_{49} | — | September 17, 2009 | Kitt Peak | Spacewatch | · | 2.4 km | MPC; JPL |
| 685346 | 2009 SN_{51} | — | September 17, 2009 | Mount Lemmon | Mount Lemmon Survey | · | 2.0 km | MPC; JPL |
| 685347 | 2009 SJ_{52} | — | September 17, 2009 | Kitt Peak | Spacewatch | · | 590 m | MPC; JPL |
| 685348 | 2009 SD_{60} | — | September 17, 2009 | Kitt Peak | Spacewatch | · | 2.2 km | MPC; JPL |
| 685349 | 2009 SQ_{63} | — | September 17, 2009 | Mount Lemmon | Mount Lemmon Survey | EOS | 1.7 km | MPC; JPL |
| 685350 | 2009 SA_{66} | — | September 17, 2009 | Kitt Peak | Spacewatch | · | 2.7 km | MPC; JPL |
| 685351 | 2009 SL_{72} | — | September 17, 2009 | Mount Lemmon | Mount Lemmon Survey | · | 2.2 km | MPC; JPL |
| 685352 | 2009 SP_{73} | — | September 9, 2004 | Kitt Peak | Spacewatch | · | 1.5 km | MPC; JPL |
| 685353 | 2009 SZ_{73} | — | September 26, 2003 | Apache Point | SDSS Collaboration | · | 2.5 km | MPC; JPL |
| 685354 | 2009 SX_{76} | — | March 15, 2007 | Mount Lemmon | Mount Lemmon Survey | · | 3.0 km | MPC; JPL |
| 685355 | 2009 SQ_{78} | — | September 18, 2009 | Kitt Peak | Spacewatch | · | 2.2 km | MPC; JPL |
| 685356 | 2009 SM_{85} | — | August 27, 2009 | Kitt Peak | Spacewatch | · | 1.7 km | MPC; JPL |
| 685357 | 2009 SS_{85} | — | August 27, 2009 | Kitt Peak | Spacewatch | · | 2.1 km | MPC; JPL |
| 685358 | 2009 SS_{90} | — | September 18, 2009 | Mount Lemmon | Mount Lemmon Survey | EOS | 1.4 km | MPC; JPL |
| 685359 | 2009 SG_{91} | — | September 18, 2009 | Kitt Peak | Spacewatch | · | 2.1 km | MPC; JPL |
| 685360 | 2009 SU_{91} | — | September 18, 2009 | Mount Lemmon | Mount Lemmon Survey | · | 2.0 km | MPC; JPL |
| 685361 | 2009 SL_{93} | — | February 17, 2007 | Kitt Peak | Spacewatch | · | 1.4 km | MPC; JPL |
| 685362 | 2009 SF_{95} | — | September 11, 2004 | Kitt Peak | Spacewatch | · | 2.2 km | MPC; JPL |
| 685363 | 2009 ST_{105} | — | September 16, 2009 | Mount Lemmon | Mount Lemmon Survey | · | 1.8 km | MPC; JPL |
| 685364 | 2009 ST_{107} | — | September 16, 2009 | Kitt Peak | Spacewatch | · | 1.2 km | MPC; JPL |
| 685365 | 2009 SP_{108} | — | September 17, 2009 | Kitt Peak | Spacewatch | · | 2.2 km | MPC; JPL |
| 685366 | 2009 SG_{110} | — | July 27, 2009 | Kitt Peak | Spacewatch | · | 2.6 km | MPC; JPL |
| 685367 | 2009 SO_{112} | — | September 18, 2009 | Kitt Peak | Spacewatch | EUP | 2.8 km | MPC; JPL |
| 685368 | 2009 SR_{112} | — | September 18, 2009 | Kitt Peak | Spacewatch | · | 2.0 km | MPC; JPL |
| 685369 | 2009 SR_{116} | — | September 18, 2009 | Kitt Peak | Spacewatch | · | 2.6 km | MPC; JPL |
| 685370 | 2009 SH_{119} | — | March 14, 2000 | Kitt Peak | Spacewatch | · | 1.2 km | MPC; JPL |
| 685371 | 2009 SG_{120} | — | September 18, 2009 | Kitt Peak | Spacewatch | · | 2.0 km | MPC; JPL |
| 685372 | 2009 SJ_{122} | — | September 18, 2009 | Kitt Peak | Spacewatch | ELF | 3.3 km | MPC; JPL |
| 685373 | 2009 SM_{126} | — | September 18, 2009 | Kitt Peak | Spacewatch | · | 2.4 km | MPC; JPL |
| 685374 | 2009 SW_{128} | — | September 18, 2009 | Kitt Peak | Spacewatch | · | 2.5 km | MPC; JPL |
| 685375 | 2009 SA_{129} | — | September 18, 2009 | Kitt Peak | Spacewatch | VER | 2.4 km | MPC; JPL |
| 685376 | 2009 SV_{130} | — | September 18, 2009 | Kitt Peak | Spacewatch | · | 1.9 km | MPC; JPL |
| 685377 | 2009 SU_{133} | — | September 18, 2009 | Kitt Peak | Spacewatch | · | 2.1 km | MPC; JPL |
| 685378 | 2009 SE_{134} | — | September 18, 2009 | Kitt Peak | Spacewatch | · | 2.3 km | MPC; JPL |
| 685379 | 2009 SP_{140} | — | September 19, 2009 | Kitt Peak | Spacewatch | EOS | 1.4 km | MPC; JPL |
| 685380 | 2009 SR_{142} | — | September 15, 2009 | Kitt Peak | Spacewatch | · | 2.2 km | MPC; JPL |
| 685381 | 2009 SV_{142} | — | September 19, 2009 | Kitt Peak | Spacewatch | · | 2.6 km | MPC; JPL |
| 685382 | 2009 SC_{152} | — | August 28, 2009 | Kitt Peak | Spacewatch | EOS | 1.5 km | MPC; JPL |
| 685383 | 2009 SY_{152} | — | September 20, 2009 | Mount Lemmon | Mount Lemmon Survey | · | 2.5 km | MPC; JPL |
| 685384 | 2009 SC_{158} | — | September 20, 2009 | Kitt Peak | Spacewatch | VER | 2.5 km | MPC; JPL |
| 685385 | 2009 SK_{162} | — | April 12, 2008 | Kitt Peak | Spacewatch | · | 1.7 km | MPC; JPL |
| 685386 | 2009 SN_{163} | — | September 21, 2009 | Mount Lemmon | Mount Lemmon Survey | · | 2.3 km | MPC; JPL |
| 685387 | 2009 SH_{167} | — | September 15, 2009 | Kitt Peak | Spacewatch | H | 340 m | MPC; JPL |
| 685388 | 2009 SE_{171} | — | September 16, 2009 | Haleakala | M. Micheli | · | 2.0 km | MPC; JPL |
| 685389 | 2009 SF_{175} | — | September 19, 2009 | Mount Lemmon | Mount Lemmon Survey | · | 1.7 km | MPC; JPL |
| 685390 | 2009 SK_{177} | — | September 20, 2009 | Kitt Peak | Spacewatch | · | 2.5 km | MPC; JPL |
| 685391 | 2009 SJ_{179} | — | October 22, 1998 | Kitt Peak | Spacewatch | (1118) | 2.4 km | MPC; JPL |
| 685392 | 2009 SJ_{182} | — | September 21, 2009 | Mount Lemmon | Mount Lemmon Survey | · | 2.3 km | MPC; JPL |
| 685393 | 2009 SV_{182} | — | October 31, 2006 | Mount Lemmon | Mount Lemmon Survey | · | 630 m | MPC; JPL |
| 685394 | 2009 SZ_{190} | — | September 23, 2004 | Kitt Peak | Spacewatch | · | 1.7 km | MPC; JPL |
| 685395 | 2009 SR_{191} | — | September 22, 2009 | Kitt Peak | Spacewatch | · | 2.1 km | MPC; JPL |
| 685396 | 2009 SK_{200} | — | September 22, 2009 | Kitt Peak | Spacewatch | · | 2.3 km | MPC; JPL |
| 685397 | 2009 SE_{201} | — | September 22, 2009 | Kitt Peak | Spacewatch | · | 2.2 km | MPC; JPL |
| 685398 | 2009 SE_{202} | — | September 22, 2009 | Kitt Peak | Spacewatch | · | 1.8 km | MPC; JPL |
| 685399 | 2009 SB_{207} | — | September 23, 2009 | Kitt Peak | Spacewatch | · | 1.1 km | MPC; JPL |
| 685400 | 2009 SD_{210} | — | September 15, 2009 | Kitt Peak | Spacewatch | · | 2.0 km | MPC; JPL |

== 685401–685500 ==
back to top

| Designation | | | Discovery | | | Properties | | Ref |
| Permanent | Provisional | Named after | Date | Site | Discoverer(s) | Category | Diam. | Ref |
|---|---|---|---|---|---|---|---|---|
| 685401 | 2009 SK_{217} | — | September 24, 2009 | Kitt Peak | Spacewatch | · | 1.6 km | MPC; JPL |
| 685402 | 2009 SJ_{218} | — | December 21, 2006 | Kitt Peak | L. H. Wasserman, M. W. Buie | · | 1.3 km | MPC; JPL |
| 685403 | 2009 SG_{224} | — | September 25, 2009 | Mount Lemmon | Mount Lemmon Survey | · | 2.2 km | MPC; JPL |
| 685404 | 2009 SV_{227} | — | September 18, 2009 | Kitt Peak | Spacewatch | 3:2 | 4.4 km | MPC; JPL |
| 685405 | 2009 SE_{230} | — | August 17, 2009 | Catalina | CSS | · | 2.2 km | MPC; JPL |
| 685406 | 2009 SM_{232} | — | September 19, 2009 | Catalina | CSS | · | 2.8 km | MPC; JPL |
| 685407 | 2009 SH_{239} | — | September 17, 2009 | Catalina | CSS | · | 550 m | MPC; JPL |
| 685408 | 2009 SP_{243} | — | November 16, 2006 | Mount Lemmon | Mount Lemmon Survey | · | 2.7 km | MPC; JPL |
| 685409 | 2009 SQ_{243} | — | September 22, 2009 | Catalina | CSS | BRA | 1.3 km | MPC; JPL |
| 685410 | 2009 SA_{249} | — | September 16, 2009 | Kitt Peak | Spacewatch | · | 1.3 km | MPC; JPL |
| 685411 | 2009 SW_{252} | — | September 22, 2009 | Kitt Peak | Spacewatch | · | 2.3 km | MPC; JPL |
| 685412 | 2009 SX_{254} | — | May 23, 2003 | Kitt Peak | Spacewatch | · | 2.2 km | MPC; JPL |
| 685413 | 2009 SO_{256} | — | August 27, 2009 | Kitt Peak | Spacewatch | · | 1.5 km | MPC; JPL |
| 685414 | 2009 ST_{256} | — | September 17, 2009 | Mount Lemmon | Mount Lemmon Survey | · | 440 m | MPC; JPL |
| 685415 | 2009 SC_{257} | — | September 21, 2009 | Mount Lemmon | Mount Lemmon Survey | · | 2.3 km | MPC; JPL |
| 685416 | 2009 SP_{260} | — | August 18, 2009 | Kitt Peak | Spacewatch | · | 910 m | MPC; JPL |
| 685417 | 2009 SR_{261} | — | September 22, 2009 | Kitt Peak | Spacewatch | · | 2.1 km | MPC; JPL |
| 685418 | 2009 SX_{265} | — | September 23, 2009 | Mount Lemmon | Mount Lemmon Survey | · | 2.9 km | MPC; JPL |
| 685419 | 2009 SK_{268} | — | September 24, 2009 | Kitt Peak | Spacewatch | · | 1.3 km | MPC; JPL |
| 685420 | 2009 ST_{271} | — | January 31, 2006 | Kitt Peak | Spacewatch | · | 2.2 km | MPC; JPL |
| 685421 | 2009 SR_{276} | — | September 25, 2009 | Kitt Peak | Spacewatch | · | 2.6 km | MPC; JPL |
| 685422 | 2009 SB_{279} | — | September 17, 2009 | Kitt Peak | Spacewatch | · | 1.1 km | MPC; JPL |
| 685423 | 2009 SC_{279} | — | September 25, 2009 | Kitt Peak | Spacewatch | · | 2.7 km | MPC; JPL |
| 685424 | 2009 SN_{285} | — | August 27, 2009 | Kitt Peak | Spacewatch | · | 2.2 km | MPC; JPL |
| 685425 | 2009 SP_{285} | — | September 29, 2005 | Kitt Peak | Spacewatch | · | 900 m | MPC; JPL |
| 685426 | 2009 SS_{285} | — | September 25, 2009 | Mount Lemmon | Mount Lemmon Survey | · | 600 m | MPC; JPL |
| 685427 | 2009 SN_{291} | — | September 25, 2009 | Kitt Peak | Spacewatch | · | 2.4 km | MPC; JPL |
| 685428 | 2009 SE_{295} | — | September 27, 2009 | Mount Lemmon | Mount Lemmon Survey | · | 2.2 km | MPC; JPL |
| 685429 | 2009 SJ_{296} | — | September 27, 2009 | Kitt Peak | Spacewatch | (1118) | 2.4 km | MPC; JPL |
| 685430 | 2009 SP_{297} | — | September 28, 2009 | Kitt Peak | Spacewatch | · | 2.1 km | MPC; JPL |
| 685431 | 2009 SQ_{299} | — | September 29, 2009 | Mount Lemmon | Mount Lemmon Survey | · | 2.8 km | MPC; JPL |
| 685432 | 2009 SS_{301} | — | September 16, 2009 | Kitt Peak | Spacewatch | L4 | 6.6 km | MPC; JPL |
| 685433 | 2009 SR_{310} | — | September 18, 2009 | Kitt Peak | Spacewatch | HYG | 2.1 km | MPC; JPL |
| 685434 | 2009 SH_{311} | — | September 18, 2009 | Mount Lemmon | Mount Lemmon Survey | · | 2.2 km | MPC; JPL |
| 685435 | 2009 SM_{313} | — | September 18, 2009 | Mount Lemmon | Mount Lemmon Survey | · | 2.6 km | MPC; JPL |
| 685436 | 2009 SQ_{314} | — | September 19, 2009 | Kitt Peak | Spacewatch | · | 850 m | MPC; JPL |
| 685437 | 2009 SM_{315} | — | September 19, 2009 | Mount Lemmon | Mount Lemmon Survey | · | 850 m | MPC; JPL |
| 685438 | 2009 SU_{317} | — | August 23, 2009 | Sandlot | G. Hug | · | 2.6 km | MPC; JPL |
| 685439 | 2009 SU_{319} | — | September 20, 2009 | Kitt Peak | Spacewatch | L4 | 6.5 km | MPC; JPL |
| 685440 | 2009 SO_{325} | — | September 27, 2009 | Mount Lemmon | Mount Lemmon Survey | · | 2.8 km | MPC; JPL |
| 685441 | 2009 SV_{328} | — | September 30, 2009 | Mount Lemmon | Mount Lemmon Survey | H | 380 m | MPC; JPL |
| 685442 | 2009 SC_{332} | — | August 17, 2009 | Catalina | CSS | · | 3.6 km | MPC; JPL |
| 685443 | 2009 SL_{336} | — | September 25, 2009 | Kitt Peak | Spacewatch | · | 1.1 km | MPC; JPL |
| 685444 | 2009 SZ_{340} | — | September 23, 2009 | Mount Lemmon | Mount Lemmon Survey | · | 2.2 km | MPC; JPL |
| 685445 | 2009 SD_{342} | — | September 16, 2009 | Kitt Peak | Spacewatch | · | 2.1 km | MPC; JPL |
| 685446 | 2009 SP_{346} | — | September 21, 2009 | Mount Lemmon | Mount Lemmon Survey | · | 2.4 km | MPC; JPL |
| 685447 | 2009 SN_{351} | — | September 18, 2009 | Kitt Peak | Spacewatch | · | 2.3 km | MPC; JPL |
| 685448 | 2009 ST_{363} | — | September 23, 2009 | Mount Lemmon | Mount Lemmon Survey | · | 2.4 km | MPC; JPL |
| 685449 | 2009 SD_{364} | — | September 28, 2009 | Mount Lemmon | Mount Lemmon Survey | · | 2.5 km | MPC; JPL |
| 685450 | 2009 SP_{367} | — | September 21, 2009 | Kitt Peak | Spacewatch | · | 1.7 km | MPC; JPL |
| 685451 | 2009 SO_{371} | — | September 21, 2009 | Kitt Peak | Spacewatch | · | 2.4 km | MPC; JPL |
| 685452 | 2009 SL_{372} | — | August 10, 2008 | La Sagra | OAM | 3:2 | 5.1 km | MPC; JPL |
| 685453 | 2009 SH_{373} | — | September 16, 2009 | Mount Lemmon | Mount Lemmon Survey | · | 2.2 km | MPC; JPL |
| 685454 | 2009 SJ_{373} | — | September 17, 2009 | Kitt Peak | Spacewatch | · | 2.7 km | MPC; JPL |
| 685455 | 2009 SE_{374} | — | July 4, 2014 | Haleakala | Pan-STARRS 1 | · | 2.8 km | MPC; JPL |
| 685456 | 2009 SK_{374} | — | September 22, 2009 | Kitt Peak | Spacewatch | · | 2.5 km | MPC; JPL |
| 685457 | 2009 SL_{374} | — | September 28, 2009 | Mount Lemmon | Mount Lemmon Survey | · | 2.3 km | MPC; JPL |
| 685458 | 2009 SU_{374} | — | September 18, 2009 | Kitt Peak | Spacewatch | · | 970 m | MPC; JPL |
| 685459 | 2009 SG_{375} | — | September 15, 2013 | Catalina | CSS | EUN | 880 m | MPC; JPL |
| 685460 | 2009 SK_{375} | — | April 2, 2013 | Mount Lemmon | Mount Lemmon Survey | LUT | 2.6 km | MPC; JPL |
| 685461 | 2009 SN_{375} | — | June 29, 2016 | Haleakala | Pan-STARRS 1 | · | 1.1 km | MPC; JPL |
| 685462 | 2009 SM_{376} | — | December 13, 2010 | Mount Lemmon | Mount Lemmon Survey | · | 3.2 km | MPC; JPL |
| 685463 | 2009 SH_{377} | — | January 6, 2012 | Kitt Peak | Spacewatch | · | 2.3 km | MPC; JPL |
| 685464 | 2009 ST_{377} | — | August 15, 2009 | Catalina | CSS | · | 2.7 km | MPC; JPL |
| 685465 | 2009 SF_{378} | — | September 21, 2009 | Mount Lemmon | Mount Lemmon Survey | HYG | 2.1 km | MPC; JPL |
| 685466 | 2009 SX_{378} | — | April 21, 2013 | Mount Lemmon | Mount Lemmon Survey | · | 2.5 km | MPC; JPL |
| 685467 | 2009 SA_{379} | — | September 21, 2009 | Kitt Peak | Spacewatch | · | 2.6 km | MPC; JPL |
| 685468 | 2009 SC_{379} | — | April 7, 2013 | Kitt Peak | Spacewatch | · | 2.5 km | MPC; JPL |
| 685469 | 2009 SQ_{379} | — | September 17, 2009 | Mount Lemmon | Mount Lemmon Survey | · | 740 m | MPC; JPL |
| 685470 | 2009 SV_{380} | — | March 10, 2016 | Haleakala | Pan-STARRS 1 | · | 1 km | MPC; JPL |
| 685471 | 2009 SB_{381} | — | April 11, 2016 | Haleakala | Pan-STARRS 1 | · | 970 m | MPC; JPL |
| 685472 | 2009 ST_{383} | — | March 31, 2013 | Mount Lemmon | Mount Lemmon Survey | · | 1.9 km | MPC; JPL |
| 685473 | 2009 SM_{387} | — | March 7, 2016 | Haleakala | Pan-STARRS 1 | H | 330 m | MPC; JPL |
| 685474 | 2009 SV_{389} | — | August 3, 2014 | Haleakala | Pan-STARRS 1 | · | 2.2 km | MPC; JPL |
| 685475 | 2009 SW_{389} | — | January 18, 2015 | Haleakala | Pan-STARRS 1 | · | 850 m | MPC; JPL |
| 685476 | 2009 SD_{390} | — | June 29, 2014 | Haleakala | Pan-STARRS 1 | · | 1.5 km | MPC; JPL |
| 685477 | 2009 SK_{391} | — | June 27, 2014 | Haleakala | Pan-STARRS 1 | LIX | 2.3 km | MPC; JPL |
| 685478 | 2009 SG_{393} | — | September 18, 2009 | Kitt Peak | Spacewatch | · | 2.2 km | MPC; JPL |
| 685479 | 2009 SL_{394} | — | September 29, 2009 | Mount Lemmon | Mount Lemmon Survey | · | 510 m | MPC; JPL |
| 685480 | 2009 SX_{394} | — | September 22, 2009 | Mount Lemmon | Mount Lemmon Survey | · | 820 m | MPC; JPL |
| 685481 | 2009 SZ_{394} | — | May 1, 2013 | Mount Lemmon | Mount Lemmon Survey | · | 2.7 km | MPC; JPL |
| 685482 | 2009 SX_{399} | — | September 19, 2009 | Mount Lemmon | Mount Lemmon Survey | · | 810 m | MPC; JPL |
| 685483 | 2009 SM_{400} | — | September 29, 2009 | Kitt Peak | Spacewatch | · | 720 m | MPC; JPL |
| 685484 | 2009 SS_{400} | — | September 19, 2009 | Kitt Peak | Spacewatch | · | 2.6 km | MPC; JPL |
| 685485 | 2009 SF_{401} | — | September 25, 2009 | Kitt Peak | Spacewatch | KOR | 1.2 km | MPC; JPL |
| 685486 | 2009 SL_{401} | — | September 20, 2009 | Mount Lemmon | Mount Lemmon Survey | · | 2.4 km | MPC; JPL |
| 685487 | 2009 SR_{401} | — | September 20, 2009 | Kitt Peak | Spacewatch | · | 2.5 km | MPC; JPL |
| 685488 | 2009 SJ_{405} | — | September 23, 2009 | Mount Lemmon | Mount Lemmon Survey | · | 2.4 km | MPC; JPL |
| 685489 | 2009 SS_{408} | — | September 21, 2009 | Mount Lemmon | Mount Lemmon Survey | VER | 1.9 km | MPC; JPL |
| 685490 | 2009 SW_{408} | — | September 17, 2009 | Kitt Peak | Spacewatch | JUN | 780 m | MPC; JPL |
| 685491 | 2009 SA_{409} | — | September 28, 2009 | Mount Lemmon | Mount Lemmon Survey | · | 1.9 km | MPC; JPL |
| 685492 | 2009 SD_{411} | — | September 19, 2009 | Kitt Peak | Spacewatch | L4 | 7.1 km | MPC; JPL |
| 685493 | 2009 SS_{411} | — | September 21, 2009 | Mount Lemmon | Mount Lemmon Survey | · | 1.4 km | MPC; JPL |
| 685494 | 2009 SX_{412} | — | September 21, 2009 | Mount Lemmon | Mount Lemmon Survey | · | 2.1 km | MPC; JPL |
| 685495 | 2009 SA_{413} | — | October 16, 2003 | Kitt Peak | Spacewatch | · | 2.4 km | MPC; JPL |
| 685496 | 2009 SN_{415} | — | September 28, 2009 | Kitt Peak | Spacewatch | L4 | 5.9 km | MPC; JPL |
| 685497 | 2009 SL_{416} | — | September 21, 2009 | Kitt Peak | Spacewatch | · | 1.1 km | MPC; JPL |
| 685498 | 2009 SK_{419} | — | September 25, 2009 | Kitt Peak | Spacewatch | L4 | 7.2 km | MPC; JPL |
| 685499 | 2009 SV_{421} | — | September 24, 2009 | Mount Lemmon | Mount Lemmon Survey | HNS | 880 m | MPC; JPL |
| 685500 | 2009 SP_{423} | — | September 27, 2009 | Catalina | CSS | · | 2.9 km | MPC; JPL |

== 685501–685600 ==
back to top

| Designation | | | Discovery | | | Properties | | Ref |
| Permanent | Provisional | Named after | Date | Site | Discoverer(s) | Category | Diam. | Ref |
|---|---|---|---|---|---|---|---|---|
| 685501 | 2009 TV_{11} | — | October 14, 2009 | La Sagra | OAM | · | 3.1 km | MPC; JPL |
| 685502 | 2009 TH_{15} | — | October 15, 2009 | Magasa | M.Tonincelli | EOS | 1.6 km | MPC; JPL |
| 685503 | 2009 TF_{29} | — | September 21, 2009 | Kitt Peak | Spacewatch | · | 2.5 km | MPC; JPL |
| 685504 | 2009 TT_{29} | — | October 15, 2009 | Mount Lemmon | Mount Lemmon Survey | · | 2.7 km | MPC; JPL |
| 685505 | 2009 TU_{29} | — | August 26, 2003 | Cerro Tololo | Deep Ecliptic Survey | VER | 2.4 km | MPC; JPL |
| 685506 | 2009 TC_{33} | — | May 1, 2003 | Kitt Peak | Spacewatch | · | 2.2 km | MPC; JPL |
| 685507 | 2009 TD_{33} | — | September 19, 2009 | Kitt Peak | Spacewatch | · | 2.2 km | MPC; JPL |
| 685508 | 2009 TQ_{43} | — | December 9, 2004 | Kitt Peak | Spacewatch | · | 2.5 km | MPC; JPL |
| 685509 | 2009 TC_{44} | — | October 14, 2009 | Mount Lemmon | Mount Lemmon Survey | · | 1.1 km | MPC; JPL |
| 685510 | 2009 TG_{50} | — | June 8, 2013 | Mount Lemmon | Mount Lemmon Survey | · | 1.5 km | MPC; JPL |
| 685511 | 2009 TJ_{50} | — | February 14, 2013 | Haleakala | Pan-STARRS 1 | 3:2 | 5.0 km | MPC; JPL |
| 685512 | 2009 TS_{50} | — | December 22, 2012 | Haleakala | Pan-STARRS 1 | H | 440 m | MPC; JPL |
| 685513 | 2009 TE_{51} | — | June 7, 2013 | Haleakala | Pan-STARRS 1 | · | 2.7 km | MPC; JPL |
| 685514 | 2009 TG_{51} | — | October 12, 2009 | Mount Lemmon | Mount Lemmon Survey | H | 340 m | MPC; JPL |
| 685515 | 2009 TV_{51} | — | April 20, 2012 | Siding Spring | SSS | · | 3.0 km | MPC; JPL |
| 685516 | 2009 TE_{54} | — | October 11, 2009 | Mount Lemmon | Mount Lemmon Survey | · | 2.4 km | MPC; JPL |
| 685517 | 2009 TG_{56} | — | October 11, 2009 | Mount Lemmon | Mount Lemmon Survey | EUP | 2.3 km | MPC; JPL |
| 685518 | 2009 UT_{3} | — | July 6, 2003 | Kitt Peak | Spacewatch | · | 2.2 km | MPC; JPL |
| 685519 | 2009 UV_{3} | — | October 11, 2009 | La Sagra | OAM | · | 2.7 km | MPC; JPL |
| 685520 | 2009 UT_{4} | — | October 17, 2009 | Bisei | BATTeRS | · | 560 m | MPC; JPL |
| 685521 | 2009 UA_{8} | — | March 15, 2007 | Kitt Peak | Spacewatch | · | 2.4 km | MPC; JPL |
| 685522 | 2009 UZ_{8} | — | October 16, 2009 | Mount Lemmon | Mount Lemmon Survey | (5) | 850 m | MPC; JPL |
| 685523 | 2009 UN_{10} | — | October 16, 2009 | Mount Lemmon | Mount Lemmon Survey | · | 970 m | MPC; JPL |
| 685524 | 2009 UN_{11} | — | September 25, 2009 | Kitt Peak | Spacewatch | · | 2.4 km | MPC; JPL |
| 685525 | 2009 UL_{12} | — | October 17, 2009 | Kitt Peak | Spacewatch | · | 2.1 km | MPC; JPL |
| 685526 | 2009 UC_{15} | — | September 28, 2009 | Mount Lemmon | Mount Lemmon Survey | · | 2.6 km | MPC; JPL |
| 685527 | 2009 UN_{23} | — | September 15, 2009 | Kitt Peak | Spacewatch | · | 2.8 km | MPC; JPL |
| 685528 | 2009 UN_{34} | — | October 21, 2009 | Kitt Peak | Spacewatch | · | 910 m | MPC; JPL |
| 685529 | 2009 UJ_{42} | — | October 18, 2009 | Mount Lemmon | Mount Lemmon Survey | · | 1.0 km | MPC; JPL |
| 685530 | 2009 UO_{46} | — | October 18, 2009 | Mount Lemmon | Mount Lemmon Survey | · | 1.6 km | MPC; JPL |
| 685531 | 2009 UR_{47} | — | September 28, 2003 | Kitt Peak | Spacewatch | · | 2.3 km | MPC; JPL |
| 685532 | 2009 UD_{48} | — | October 22, 2009 | Mount Lemmon | Mount Lemmon Survey | · | 2.1 km | MPC; JPL |
| 685533 | 2009 UF_{50} | — | October 22, 2009 | Mount Lemmon | Mount Lemmon Survey | VER | 1.7 km | MPC; JPL |
| 685534 | 2009 UP_{57} | — | February 1, 2006 | Kitt Peak | Spacewatch | KOR | 1.2 km | MPC; JPL |
| 685535 | 2009 US_{58} | — | March 13, 2007 | Mount Lemmon | Mount Lemmon Survey | URS | 3.0 km | MPC; JPL |
| 685536 | 2009 UR_{61} | — | October 17, 2009 | Mount Lemmon | Mount Lemmon Survey | · | 2.8 km | MPC; JPL |
| 685537 | 2009 UR_{62} | — | September 16, 2009 | Kitt Peak | Spacewatch | H | 300 m | MPC; JPL |
| 685538 | 2009 UM_{63} | — | September 26, 2009 | Kitt Peak | Spacewatch | VER | 2.2 km | MPC; JPL |
| 685539 | 2009 UV_{63} | — | September 29, 2009 | Kitt Peak | Spacewatch | · | 1.9 km | MPC; JPL |
| 685540 | 2009 UU_{65} | — | October 17, 2009 | Mount Lemmon | Mount Lemmon Survey | · | 1.1 km | MPC; JPL |
| 685541 | 2009 UX_{66} | — | September 21, 2009 | Kitt Peak | Spacewatch | · | 2.6 km | MPC; JPL |
| 685542 | 2009 UG_{75} | — | May 9, 2007 | Mount Lemmon | Mount Lemmon Survey | · | 2.6 km | MPC; JPL |
| 685543 | 2009 UB_{78} | — | September 14, 2009 | Kitt Peak | Spacewatch | · | 2.4 km | MPC; JPL |
| 685544 | 2009 UZ_{79} | — | October 22, 2009 | Mount Lemmon | Mount Lemmon Survey | · | 2.6 km | MPC; JPL |
| 685545 | 2009 US_{82} | — | October 23, 2009 | Mount Lemmon | Mount Lemmon Survey | · | 520 m | MPC; JPL |
| 685546 | 2009 UE_{85} | — | October 23, 2009 | Mount Lemmon | Mount Lemmon Survey | · | 2.6 km | MPC; JPL |
| 685547 | 2009 UH_{87} | — | March 14, 2007 | Mount Lemmon | Mount Lemmon Survey | · | 2.5 km | MPC; JPL |
| 685548 | 2009 UF_{92} | — | October 16, 2009 | Mount Lemmon | Mount Lemmon Survey | · | 1.2 km | MPC; JPL |
| 685549 | 2009 UR_{92} | — | October 21, 2009 | Zelenchukskaya Stn | T. V. Krjačko, Satovski, B. | · | 2.4 km | MPC; JPL |
| 685550 | 2009 UK_{95} | — | October 22, 2009 | Mount Lemmon | Mount Lemmon Survey | HNS | 1.1 km | MPC; JPL |
| 685551 | 2009 UV_{95} | — | October 15, 2009 | Bergisch Gladbach | W. Bickel | · | 2.4 km | MPC; JPL |
| 685552 | 2009 UE_{97} | — | October 22, 2009 | Mount Lemmon | Mount Lemmon Survey | · | 1.3 km | MPC; JPL |
| 685553 | 2009 UD_{99} | — | September 16, 2003 | Kitt Peak | Spacewatch | HYG | 2.1 km | MPC; JPL |
| 685554 | 2009 UD_{104} | — | September 27, 2009 | Kitt Peak | Spacewatch | · | 500 m | MPC; JPL |
| 685555 | 2009 UW_{114} | — | October 21, 2009 | Mount Lemmon | Mount Lemmon Survey | · | 900 m | MPC; JPL |
| 685556 | 2009 UJ_{115} | — | October 21, 2009 | Mount Lemmon | Mount Lemmon Survey | · | 590 m | MPC; JPL |
| 685557 | 2009 UR_{118} | — | October 23, 2009 | Mount Lemmon | Mount Lemmon Survey | · | 2.4 km | MPC; JPL |
| 685558 | 2009 UL_{122} | — | October 15, 2009 | Bergisch Gladbach | W. Bickel | · | 990 m | MPC; JPL |
| 685559 | 2009 UV_{122} | — | October 26, 2009 | Mount Lemmon | Mount Lemmon Survey | · | 1.5 km | MPC; JPL |
| 685560 | 2009 UY_{122} | — | October 28, 2005 | Mount Lemmon | Mount Lemmon Survey | · | 1.1 km | MPC; JPL |
| 685561 | 2009 UU_{139} | — | January 28, 2011 | Mount Lemmon | Mount Lemmon Survey | · | 2.4 km | MPC; JPL |
| 685562 | 2009 UL_{142} | — | October 18, 2009 | Mount Lemmon | Mount Lemmon Survey | MAR | 830 m | MPC; JPL |
| 685563 | 2009 UJ_{143} | — | October 18, 2009 | Mount Lemmon | Mount Lemmon Survey | · | 1.3 km | MPC; JPL |
| 685564 | 2009 UO_{150} | — | October 18, 2009 | Mount Lemmon | Mount Lemmon Survey | LIX | 2.9 km | MPC; JPL |
| 685565 | 2009 UK_{161} | — | October 16, 2009 | Mount Lemmon | Mount Lemmon Survey | · | 690 m | MPC; JPL |
| 685566 | 2009 UV_{161} | — | October 17, 2009 | Mount Lemmon | Mount Lemmon Survey | · | 2.9 km | MPC; JPL |
| 685567 | 2009 UZ_{161} | — | November 27, 2014 | Haleakala | Pan-STARRS 1 | · | 1.0 km | MPC; JPL |
| 685568 | 2009 UA_{162} | — | December 10, 2010 | Mount Lemmon | Mount Lemmon Survey | · | 1.6 km | MPC; JPL |
| 685569 | 2009 UE_{162} | — | October 27, 2009 | Mount Lemmon | Mount Lemmon Survey | · | 1.2 km | MPC; JPL |
| 685570 | 2009 US_{162} | — | October 18, 2009 | Mount Lemmon | Mount Lemmon Survey | · | 750 m | MPC; JPL |
| 685571 | 2009 UQ_{164} | — | April 19, 2013 | Haleakala | Pan-STARRS 1 | · | 2.4 km | MPC; JPL |
| 685572 | 2009 UA_{165} | — | July 28, 2014 | Haleakala | Pan-STARRS 1 | · | 2.2 km | MPC; JPL |
| 685573 | 2009 UF_{166} | — | June 7, 2013 | Haleakala | Pan-STARRS 1 | · | 2.2 km | MPC; JPL |
| 685574 | 2009 UH_{166} | — | October 24, 2009 | Mount Lemmon | Mount Lemmon Survey | · | 1.6 km | MPC; JPL |
| 685575 | 2009 UP_{166} | — | September 14, 2013 | Mount Lemmon | Mount Lemmon Survey | · | 1.4 km | MPC; JPL |
| 685576 | 2009 UB_{168} | — | June 2, 2013 | Kitt Peak | Spacewatch | · | 2.3 km | MPC; JPL |
| 685577 | 2009 UU_{169} | — | September 21, 2009 | Mount Lemmon | Mount Lemmon Survey | TIR | 1.8 km | MPC; JPL |
| 685578 | 2009 UJ_{171} | — | October 12, 2015 | Haleakala | Pan-STARRS 1 | · | 2.5 km | MPC; JPL |
| 685579 | 2009 UK_{171} | — | January 23, 2015 | Haleakala | Pan-STARRS 1 | · | 960 m | MPC; JPL |
| 685580 | 2009 UZ_{173} | — | October 21, 2009 | Mount Lemmon | Mount Lemmon Survey | · | 1.6 km | MPC; JPL |
| 685581 | 2009 UD_{174} | — | October 23, 2009 | Mount Lemmon | Mount Lemmon Survey | · | 780 m | MPC; JPL |
| 685582 | 2009 UB_{176} | — | October 21, 2009 | Mount Lemmon | Mount Lemmon Survey | HNS | 900 m | MPC; JPL |
| 685583 | 2009 UH_{176} | — | October 24, 2009 | Kitt Peak | Spacewatch | · | 2.1 km | MPC; JPL |
| 685584 | 2009 UT_{179} | — | October 18, 2009 | Mount Lemmon | Mount Lemmon Survey | · | 1.1 km | MPC; JPL |
| 685585 | 2009 UY_{180} | — | October 24, 2009 | Kitt Peak | Spacewatch | · | 2.4 km | MPC; JPL |
| 685586 | 2009 UX_{181} | — | October 16, 2009 | Mount Lemmon | Mount Lemmon Survey | EOS | 1.4 km | MPC; JPL |
| 685587 | 2009 UY_{183} | — | October 18, 2009 | Mount Lemmon | Mount Lemmon Survey | VER | 1.9 km | MPC; JPL |
| 685588 | 2009 UR_{184} | — | October 25, 2009 | Kitt Peak | Spacewatch | · | 490 m | MPC; JPL |
| 685589 | 2009 UX_{184} | — | October 26, 2009 | Kitt Peak | Spacewatch | (12739) | 1.3 km | MPC; JPL |
| 685590 | 2009 UA_{187} | — | October 18, 2009 | Mount Lemmon | Mount Lemmon Survey | · | 2.3 km | MPC; JPL |
| 685591 | 2009 UT_{188} | — | October 16, 2009 | Mount Lemmon | Mount Lemmon Survey | · | 870 m | MPC; JPL |
| 685592 | 2009 UT_{190} | — | October 22, 2009 | Mount Lemmon | Mount Lemmon Survey | EOS | 1.6 km | MPC; JPL |
| 685593 | 2009 UY_{192} | — | October 17, 2009 | Kitt Peak | Spacewatch | · | 510 m | MPC; JPL |
| 685594 | 2009 UF_{194} | — | October 23, 2009 | Mount Lemmon | Mount Lemmon Survey | · | 2.3 km | MPC; JPL |
| 685595 | 2009 UG_{196} | — | April 19, 2015 | Cerro Tololo | DECam | L4 | 4.9 km | MPC; JPL |
| 685596 | 2009 VK_{3} | — | October 17, 2009 | Catalina | CSS | H | 610 m | MPC; JPL |
| 685597 | 2009 VW_{4} | — | October 18, 2009 | Kitt Peak | Spacewatch | · | 2.6 km | MPC; JPL |
| 685598 | 2009 VY_{5} | — | November 8, 2009 | Mount Lemmon | Mount Lemmon Survey | · | 2.2 km | MPC; JPL |
| 685599 | 2009 VL_{17} | — | November 8, 2009 | Mount Lemmon | Mount Lemmon Survey | · | 2.9 km | MPC; JPL |
| 685600 | 2009 VT_{21} | — | November 9, 2009 | Mount Lemmon | Mount Lemmon Survey | · | 550 m | MPC; JPL |

== 685601–685700 ==
back to top

| Designation | | | Discovery | | | Properties | | Ref |
| Permanent | Provisional | Named after | Date | Site | Discoverer(s) | Category | Diam. | Ref |
|---|---|---|---|---|---|---|---|---|
| 685601 | 2009 VL_{27} | — | September 29, 2005 | Kitt Peak | Spacewatch | · | 1.0 km | MPC; JPL |
| 685602 | 2009 VL_{30} | — | November 9, 2009 | Mount Lemmon | Mount Lemmon Survey | VER | 1.9 km | MPC; JPL |
| 685603 | 2009 VN_{31} | — | November 9, 2009 | Mount Lemmon | Mount Lemmon Survey | H | 470 m | MPC; JPL |
| 685604 | 2009 VN_{33} | — | October 26, 2009 | Mount Lemmon | Mount Lemmon Survey | · | 1.3 km | MPC; JPL |
| 685605 | 2009 VD_{35} | — | November 10, 2009 | Mount Lemmon | Mount Lemmon Survey | · | 2.6 km | MPC; JPL |
| 685606 | 2009 VD_{38} | — | October 23, 2009 | Kitt Peak | Spacewatch | · | 570 m | MPC; JPL |
| 685607 | 2009 VT_{39} | — | October 26, 2009 | Kitt Peak | Spacewatch | H | 400 m | MPC; JPL |
| 685608 | 2009 VL_{49} | — | October 27, 2009 | Mount Lemmon | Mount Lemmon Survey | · | 2.7 km | MPC; JPL |
| 685609 | 2009 VF_{54} | — | October 24, 2009 | Kitt Peak | Spacewatch | L4 | 5.7 km | MPC; JPL |
| 685610 | 2009 VB_{56} | — | October 24, 2009 | Kitt Peak | Spacewatch | MAS | 590 m | MPC; JPL |
| 685611 | 2009 VT_{56} | — | November 11, 2009 | Mount Lemmon | Mount Lemmon Survey | · | 2.1 km | MPC; JPL |
| 685612 | 2009 VJ_{60} | — | December 15, 2006 | Kitt Peak | Spacewatch | · | 490 m | MPC; JPL |
| 685613 | 2009 VG_{64} | — | November 8, 2009 | Mount Lemmon | Mount Lemmon Survey | · | 1.3 km | MPC; JPL |
| 685614 | 2009 VX_{66} | — | November 9, 2009 | Kitt Peak | Spacewatch | · | 820 m | MPC; JPL |
| 685615 | 2009 VC_{67} | — | November 9, 2009 | Kitt Peak | Spacewatch | · | 2.4 km | MPC; JPL |
| 685616 | 2009 VZ_{69} | — | November 9, 2009 | Kitt Peak | Spacewatch | HNS | 930 m | MPC; JPL |
| 685617 | 2009 VK_{70} | — | October 16, 2009 | Mount Lemmon | Mount Lemmon Survey | JUN | 860 m | MPC; JPL |
| 685618 | 2009 VK_{74} | — | October 24, 2009 | Kitt Peak | Spacewatch | · | 3.1 km | MPC; JPL |
| 685619 | 2009 VR_{74} | — | September 17, 2009 | Mount Lemmon | Mount Lemmon Survey | · | 2.2 km | MPC; JPL |
| 685620 | 2009 VU_{74} | — | November 11, 2009 | Kitt Peak | Spacewatch | EOS | 1.8 km | MPC; JPL |
| 685621 | 2009 VM_{76} | — | November 15, 2009 | Catalina | CSS | H | 440 m | MPC; JPL |
| 685622 | 2009 VA_{85} | — | November 10, 2009 | Kitt Peak | Spacewatch | · | 630 m | MPC; JPL |
| 685623 | 2009 VU_{85} | — | November 10, 2009 | Kitt Peak | Spacewatch | · | 530 m | MPC; JPL |
| 685624 | 2009 VZ_{87} | — | March 12, 2007 | Mount Lemmon | Mount Lemmon Survey | · | 850 m | MPC; JPL |
| 685625 | 2009 VH_{94} | — | November 10, 2009 | Kitt Peak | Spacewatch | NYS | 1.0 km | MPC; JPL |
| 685626 | 2009 VO_{95} | — | November 10, 2009 | Kitt Peak | Spacewatch | TIR | 2.7 km | MPC; JPL |
| 685627 | 2009 VH_{97} | — | November 9, 2009 | Kitt Peak | Spacewatch | · | 2.3 km | MPC; JPL |
| 685628 | 2009 VR_{97} | — | November 9, 2009 | Kitt Peak | Spacewatch | EUN | 1.1 km | MPC; JPL |
| 685629 | 2009 VA_{99} | — | November 9, 2009 | Mount Lemmon | Mount Lemmon Survey | · | 990 m | MPC; JPL |
| 685630 | 2009 VM_{100} | — | October 21, 2003 | Kitt Peak | Spacewatch | · | 2.3 km | MPC; JPL |
| 685631 | 2009 VX_{110} | — | September 21, 2009 | Mount Lemmon | Mount Lemmon Survey | · | 2.7 km | MPC; JPL |
| 685632 | 2009 VZ_{111} | — | September 16, 2009 | Mount Lemmon | Mount Lemmon Survey | · | 1.5 km | MPC; JPL |
| 685633 | 2009 VM_{114} | — | November 10, 2009 | Mount Lemmon | Mount Lemmon Survey | · | 600 m | MPC; JPL |
| 685634 | 2009 VE_{119} | — | November 16, 2003 | Kitt Peak | Spacewatch | · | 2.8 km | MPC; JPL |
| 685635 | 2009 VM_{119} | — | November 9, 2009 | Kitt Peak | Spacewatch | · | 1.4 km | MPC; JPL |
| 685636 | 2009 VU_{119} | — | December 22, 2016 | Haleakala | Pan-STARRS 1 | LUT | 4.3 km | MPC; JPL |
| 685637 | 2009 VV_{119} | — | November 16, 2002 | Palomar | NEAT | · | 830 m | MPC; JPL |
| 685638 | 2009 VD_{120} | — | October 27, 2009 | Kitt Peak | Spacewatch | KON | 2.0 km | MPC; JPL |
| 685639 | 2009 VP_{120} | — | March 2, 2011 | Mount Lemmon | Mount Lemmon Survey | · | 2.2 km | MPC; JPL |
| 685640 | 2009 VT_{120} | — | November 10, 2009 | Kitt Peak | Spacewatch | · | 1.3 km | MPC; JPL |
| 685641 | 2009 VB_{121} | — | November 11, 2009 | Mount Lemmon | Mount Lemmon Survey | · | 2.5 km | MPC; JPL |
| 685642 | 2009 VC_{122} | — | November 9, 2009 | Kitt Peak | Spacewatch | NYS | 720 m | MPC; JPL |
| 685643 | 2009 VU_{124} | — | August 28, 2014 | Haleakala | Pan-STARRS 1 | · | 1.9 km | MPC; JPL |
| 685644 | 2009 VV_{125} | — | November 11, 2009 | Kitt Peak | Spacewatch | · | 1.2 km | MPC; JPL |
| 685645 | 2009 VW_{125} | — | November 11, 2009 | Kitt Peak | Spacewatch | · | 1.8 km | MPC; JPL |
| 685646 | 2009 VX_{125} | — | November 10, 2009 | Kitt Peak | Spacewatch | (2076) | 830 m | MPC; JPL |
| 685647 | 2009 VR_{126} | — | November 11, 2009 | Kitt Peak | Spacewatch | KON | 1.8 km | MPC; JPL |
| 685648 | 2009 VZ_{126} | — | November 8, 2009 | Mount Lemmon | Mount Lemmon Survey | · | 2.5 km | MPC; JPL |
| 685649 | 2009 VJ_{127} | — | November 10, 2009 | Mount Lemmon | Mount Lemmon Survey | · | 2.7 km | MPC; JPL |
| 685650 | 2009 VG_{131} | — | November 8, 2009 | Mount Lemmon | Mount Lemmon Survey | · | 940 m | MPC; JPL |
| 685651 | 2009 WN_{2} | — | November 16, 2009 | Mount Lemmon | Mount Lemmon Survey | (5) | 810 m | MPC; JPL |
| 685652 | 2009 WF_{12} | — | October 14, 2009 | Catalina | CSS | TIR | 2.4 km | MPC; JPL |
| 685653 | 2009 WM_{16} | — | May 28, 2008 | Mount Lemmon | Mount Lemmon Survey | · | 740 m | MPC; JPL |
| 685654 | 2009 WN_{27} | — | October 25, 2009 | Kitt Peak | Spacewatch | · | 730 m | MPC; JPL |
| 685655 | 2009 WG_{30} | — | September 17, 2003 | Siding Spring | G. J. Garradd, R. H. McNaught | · | 2.4 km | MPC; JPL |
| 685656 | 2009 WO_{30} | — | October 25, 2005 | Mount Lemmon | Mount Lemmon Survey | · | 1.2 km | MPC; JPL |
| 685657 | 2009 WZ_{32} | — | November 16, 2009 | Kitt Peak | Spacewatch | · | 1.2 km | MPC; JPL |
| 685658 | 2009 WN_{49} | — | December 13, 2006 | Kitt Peak | Spacewatch | · | 510 m | MPC; JPL |
| 685659 | 2009 WT_{57} | — | November 16, 2009 | Mount Lemmon | Mount Lemmon Survey | (5) | 810 m | MPC; JPL |
| 685660 | 2009 WN_{58} | — | November 16, 2009 | Mount Lemmon | Mount Lemmon Survey | AGN | 1.0 km | MPC; JPL |
| 685661 | 2009 WV_{59} | — | November 16, 2009 | Mount Lemmon | Mount Lemmon Survey | KOR | 1.1 km | MPC; JPL |
| 685662 | 2009 WW_{59} | — | January 26, 2006 | Kitt Peak | Spacewatch | KOR | 990 m | MPC; JPL |
| 685663 | 2009 WH_{60} | — | November 16, 2009 | Mount Lemmon | Mount Lemmon Survey | · | 2.0 km | MPC; JPL |
| 685664 | 2009 WF_{63} | — | November 16, 2009 | Mount Lemmon | Mount Lemmon Survey | EOS | 1.7 km | MPC; JPL |
| 685665 | 2009 WS_{63} | — | November 16, 2009 | Mount Lemmon | Mount Lemmon Survey | EOS | 1.6 km | MPC; JPL |
| 685666 | 2009 WR_{65} | — | November 17, 2009 | Mount Lemmon | Mount Lemmon Survey | · | 2.6 km | MPC; JPL |
| 685667 | 2009 WO_{66} | — | November 17, 2009 | Mount Lemmon | Mount Lemmon Survey | VER | 2.2 km | MPC; JPL |
| 685668 | 2009 WP_{66} | — | November 17, 2009 | Mount Lemmon | Mount Lemmon Survey | · | 2.1 km | MPC; JPL |
| 685669 | 2009 WM_{67} | — | November 17, 2009 | Mount Lemmon | Mount Lemmon Survey | · | 620 m | MPC; JPL |
| 685670 | 2009 WA_{68} | — | November 17, 2009 | Mount Lemmon | Mount Lemmon Survey | · | 1.6 km | MPC; JPL |
| 685671 | 2009 WT_{68} | — | November 17, 2009 | Mount Lemmon | Mount Lemmon Survey | · | 2.9 km | MPC; JPL |
| 685672 | 2009 WZ_{68} | — | October 12, 2009 | Mount Lemmon | Mount Lemmon Survey | · | 2.6 km | MPC; JPL |
| 685673 | 2009 WJ_{69} | — | November 17, 2009 | Mount Lemmon | Mount Lemmon Survey | · | 2.6 km | MPC; JPL |
| 685674 | 2009 WL_{76} | — | March 2, 2006 | Mount Lemmon | Mount Lemmon Survey | · | 2.3 km | MPC; JPL |
| 685675 | 2009 WE_{79} | — | October 26, 2009 | Kitt Peak | Spacewatch | · | 890 m | MPC; JPL |
| 685676 | 2009 WC_{82} | — | August 22, 2003 | Palomar | NEAT | EOS | 1.8 km | MPC; JPL |
| 685677 | 2009 WA_{86} | — | November 19, 2009 | Kitt Peak | Spacewatch | · | 1.5 km | MPC; JPL |
| 685678 | 2009 WD_{87} | — | November 19, 2009 | Kitt Peak | Spacewatch | VER | 2.6 km | MPC; JPL |
| 685679 | 2009 WR_{88} | — | November 19, 2009 | Kitt Peak | Spacewatch | · | 2.0 km | MPC; JPL |
| 685680 | 2009 WG_{97} | — | November 20, 2009 | Mount Lemmon | Mount Lemmon Survey | · | 1.2 km | MPC; JPL |
| 685681 | 2009 WV_{97} | — | November 8, 2009 | Kitt Peak | Spacewatch | H | 440 m | MPC; JPL |
| 685682 | 2009 WE_{103} | — | November 22, 2009 | Mount Lemmon | Mount Lemmon Survey | · | 2.5 km | MPC; JPL |
| 685683 | 2009 WH_{107} | — | October 23, 2009 | Mount Lemmon | Mount Lemmon Survey | KOR | 1.2 km | MPC; JPL |
| 685684 | 2009 WT_{108} | — | November 16, 2009 | Mount Lemmon | Mount Lemmon Survey | · | 1.1 km | MPC; JPL |
| 685685 | 2009 WR_{109} | — | November 17, 2009 | Mount Lemmon | Mount Lemmon Survey | · | 1.2 km | MPC; JPL |
| 685686 | 2009 WS_{111} | — | November 2, 2005 | Mount Lemmon | Mount Lemmon Survey | · | 790 m | MPC; JPL |
| 685687 | 2009 WK_{114} | — | October 19, 1998 | Kitt Peak | Spacewatch | · | 2.6 km | MPC; JPL |
| 685688 | 2009 WA_{117} | — | November 20, 2009 | Kitt Peak | Spacewatch | · | 1.3 km | MPC; JPL |
| 685689 | 2009 WX_{117} | — | November 20, 2009 | Kitt Peak | Spacewatch | · | 1.9 km | MPC; JPL |
| 685690 | 2009 WH_{120} | — | December 1, 2005 | Mount Lemmon | Mount Lemmon Survey | · | 1.2 km | MPC; JPL |
| 685691 | 2009 WS_{121} | — | November 20, 2009 | Kitt Peak | Spacewatch | · | 730 m | MPC; JPL |
| 685692 | 2009 WY_{122} | — | November 8, 2009 | Kitt Peak | Spacewatch | · | 2.1 km | MPC; JPL |
| 685693 | 2009 WB_{126} | — | October 23, 2003 | Kitt Peak | Spacewatch | · | 2.7 km | MPC; JPL |
| 685694 | 2009 WM_{129} | — | November 20, 2009 | Mount Lemmon | Mount Lemmon Survey | · | 1.7 km | MPC; JPL |
| 685695 | 2009 WF_{131} | — | November 20, 2009 | Kitt Peak | Spacewatch | · | 1.5 km | MPC; JPL |
| 685696 | 2009 WR_{131} | — | November 20, 2009 | Mount Lemmon | Mount Lemmon Survey | · | 2.5 km | MPC; JPL |
| 685697 | 2009 WB_{135} | — | November 22, 2009 | Mount Lemmon | Mount Lemmon Survey | EOS | 2.0 km | MPC; JPL |
| 685698 | 2009 WQ_{144} | — | November 20, 2004 | Kitt Peak | Spacewatch | · | 2.0 km | MPC; JPL |
| 685699 | 2009 WV_{144} | — | January 3, 2014 | Kitt Peak | Spacewatch | MAS | 460 m | MPC; JPL |
| 685700 | 2009 WX_{147} | — | September 28, 2009 | Mount Lemmon | Mount Lemmon Survey | · | 1.3 km | MPC; JPL |

== 685701–685800 ==
back to top

| Designation | | | Discovery | | | Properties | | Ref |
| Permanent | Provisional | Named after | Date | Site | Discoverer(s) | Category | Diam. | Ref |
|---|---|---|---|---|---|---|---|---|
| 685701 | 2009 WG_{151} | — | November 19, 2009 | Mount Lemmon | Mount Lemmon Survey | · | 2.2 km | MPC; JPL |
| 685702 | 2009 WE_{152} | — | November 19, 2009 | Mount Lemmon | Mount Lemmon Survey | · | 1.7 km | MPC; JPL |
| 685703 | 2009 WG_{153} | — | November 19, 2009 | Mount Lemmon | Mount Lemmon Survey | VER | 2.6 km | MPC; JPL |
| 685704 | 2009 WR_{161} | — | October 16, 2009 | Mount Lemmon | Mount Lemmon Survey | · | 2.7 km | MPC; JPL |
| 685705 | 2009 WP_{163} | — | November 21, 2009 | Kitt Peak | Spacewatch | · | 2.6 km | MPC; JPL |
| 685706 | 2009 WE_{164} | — | November 8, 2009 | Mount Lemmon | Mount Lemmon Survey | · | 440 m | MPC; JPL |
| 685707 | 2009 WD_{166} | — | November 21, 2009 | Kitt Peak | Spacewatch | · | 2.8 km | MPC; JPL |
| 685708 | 2009 WD_{168} | — | November 22, 2009 | Kitt Peak | Spacewatch | · | 840 m | MPC; JPL |
| 685709 | 2009 WC_{170} | — | November 22, 2009 | Kitt Peak | Spacewatch | · | 2.8 km | MPC; JPL |
| 685710 | 2009 WT_{171} | — | October 18, 2003 | Kitt Peak | Spacewatch | · | 2.8 km | MPC; JPL |
| 685711 | 2009 WC_{173} | — | November 22, 2009 | Mount Lemmon | Mount Lemmon Survey | MAR | 780 m | MPC; JPL |
| 685712 | 2009 WU_{174} | — | November 22, 2009 | Kitt Peak | Spacewatch | · | 1.7 km | MPC; JPL |
| 685713 | 2009 WP_{179} | — | November 9, 2009 | Mount Lemmon | Mount Lemmon Survey | · | 2.5 km | MPC; JPL |
| 685714 | 2009 WF_{180} | — | November 23, 2009 | Kitt Peak | Spacewatch | · | 1.2 km | MPC; JPL |
| 685715 | 2009 WG_{180} | — | November 23, 2009 | Kitt Peak | Spacewatch | (5) | 850 m | MPC; JPL |
| 685716 | 2009 WK_{181} | — | November 23, 2009 | Kitt Peak | Spacewatch | LIX | 2.7 km | MPC; JPL |
| 685717 | 2009 WQ_{182} | — | November 23, 2009 | Mount Lemmon | Mount Lemmon Survey | HYG | 2.4 km | MPC; JPL |
| 685718 | 2009 WZ_{185} | — | November 24, 2009 | Mount Lemmon | Mount Lemmon Survey | · | 870 m | MPC; JPL |
| 685719 | 2009 WG_{188} | — | October 18, 2009 | Mount Lemmon | Mount Lemmon Survey | · | 710 m | MPC; JPL |
| 685720 | 2009 WO_{189} | — | November 24, 2009 | Kitt Peak | Spacewatch | EOS | 1.4 km | MPC; JPL |
| 685721 | 2009 WR_{189} | — | November 16, 2009 | Kitt Peak | Spacewatch | · | 2.2 km | MPC; JPL |
| 685722 | 2009 WZ_{189} | — | November 24, 2009 | Kitt Peak | Spacewatch | HOF | 2.0 km | MPC; JPL |
| 685723 | 2009 WL_{196} | — | November 25, 2009 | Mount Lemmon | Mount Lemmon Survey | · | 1.1 km | MPC; JPL |
| 685724 | 2009 WM_{197} | — | November 25, 2009 | Mount Lemmon | Mount Lemmon Survey | · | 480 m | MPC; JPL |
| 685725 | 2009 WK_{198} | — | August 30, 2005 | Kitt Peak | Spacewatch | · | 850 m | MPC; JPL |
| 685726 | 2009 WX_{201} | — | November 26, 2009 | Mount Lemmon | Mount Lemmon Survey | · | 1.0 km | MPC; JPL |
| 685727 | 2009 WH_{205} | — | November 17, 2009 | Kitt Peak | Spacewatch | · | 3.0 km | MPC; JPL |
| 685728 | 2009 WB_{207} | — | April 25, 2007 | Kitt Peak | Spacewatch | EUP | 3.0 km | MPC; JPL |
| 685729 | 2009 WW_{212} | — | November 18, 2009 | Kitt Peak | Spacewatch | · | 1.1 km | MPC; JPL |
| 685730 | 2009 WB_{214} | — | November 19, 2009 | Kitt Peak | Spacewatch | EOS | 1.5 km | MPC; JPL |
| 685731 | 2009 WA_{219} | — | April 6, 2008 | Mount Lemmon | Mount Lemmon Survey | · | 640 m | MPC; JPL |
| 685732 | 2009 WT_{223} | — | November 16, 2009 | Mount Lemmon | Mount Lemmon Survey | · | 1.1 km | MPC; JPL |
| 685733 | 2009 WS_{225} | — | December 19, 2004 | Mount Lemmon | Mount Lemmon Survey | · | 2.2 km | MPC; JPL |
| 685734 | 2009 WJ_{227} | — | October 29, 2005 | Mount Lemmon | Mount Lemmon Survey | · | 960 m | MPC; JPL |
| 685735 | 2009 WW_{228} | — | October 23, 2009 | Mount Lemmon | Mount Lemmon Survey | · | 2.6 km | MPC; JPL |
| 685736 | 2009 WH_{230} | — | November 17, 2009 | Mount Lemmon | Mount Lemmon Survey | · | 2.6 km | MPC; JPL |
| 685737 | 2009 WY_{230} | — | November 17, 2009 | Mount Lemmon | Mount Lemmon Survey | · | 510 m | MPC; JPL |
| 685738 | 2009 WW_{235} | — | November 20, 2009 | Mount Lemmon | Mount Lemmon Survey | · | 970 m | MPC; JPL |
| 685739 Semago | 2009 WP_{236} | Semago | November 23, 2009 | Zelenchukskaya Stn | T. V. Krjačko, Satovski, B. | · | 1.3 km | MPC; JPL |
| 685740 | 2009 WN_{239} | — | November 17, 2009 | Kitt Peak | Spacewatch | EOS | 1.9 km | MPC; JPL |
| 685741 | 2009 WR_{241} | — | November 18, 2009 | Mount Lemmon | Mount Lemmon Survey | · | 1.9 km | MPC; JPL |
| 685742 | 2009 WX_{241} | — | November 18, 2009 | Mount Lemmon | Mount Lemmon Survey | (5) | 870 m | MPC; JPL |
| 685743 | 2009 WZ_{242} | — | November 19, 2009 | Kitt Peak | Spacewatch | V | 600 m | MPC; JPL |
| 685744 | 2009 WQ_{243} | — | November 19, 2009 | Kitt Peak | Spacewatch | (5) | 950 m | MPC; JPL |
| 685745 | 2009 WS_{258} | — | November 27, 2009 | Mount Lemmon | Mount Lemmon Survey | · | 2.6 km | MPC; JPL |
| 685746 | 2009 WM_{259} | — | January 17, 2007 | Kitt Peak | Spacewatch | · | 710 m | MPC; JPL |
| 685747 | 2009 WN_{261} | — | November 17, 2009 | Catalina | CSS | · | 780 m | MPC; JPL |
| 685748 | 2009 WC_{273} | — | May 30, 2016 | Haleakala | Pan-STARRS 1 | · | 930 m | MPC; JPL |
| 685749 | 2009 WE_{273} | — | December 14, 2015 | Haleakala | Pan-STARRS 1 | · | 2.3 km | MPC; JPL |
| 685750 | 2009 WY_{273} | — | November 17, 2009 | Mount Lemmon | Mount Lemmon Survey | · | 1.0 km | MPC; JPL |
| 685751 | 2009 WP_{274} | — | May 3, 2016 | Haleakala | Pan-STARRS 1 | H | 430 m | MPC; JPL |
| 685752 | 2009 WA_{275} | — | September 2, 2014 | Haleakala | Pan-STARRS 1 | LIX | 2.6 km | MPC; JPL |
| 685753 | 2009 WD_{275} | — | May 15, 2012 | Haleakala | Pan-STARRS 1 | · | 940 m | MPC; JPL |
| 685754 | 2009 WF_{275} | — | November 2, 2013 | Mount Lemmon | Mount Lemmon Survey | HNS | 810 m | MPC; JPL |
| 685755 | 2009 WN_{278} | — | September 29, 2008 | Kitt Peak | Spacewatch | · | 2.2 km | MPC; JPL |
| 685756 | 2009 WO_{278} | — | January 30, 2011 | Mount Lemmon | Mount Lemmon Survey | · | 2.6 km | MPC; JPL |
| 685757 | 2009 WR_{278} | — | October 2, 2014 | Haleakala | Pan-STARRS 1 | · | 4.4 km | MPC; JPL |
| 685758 | 2009 WZ_{278} | — | January 7, 1999 | Kitt Peak | Spacewatch | · | 2.8 km | MPC; JPL |
| 685759 | 2009 WP_{279} | — | July 16, 2013 | Haleakala | Pan-STARRS 1 | · | 1.4 km | MPC; JPL |
| 685760 | 2009 WW_{279} | — | November 24, 2009 | Kitt Peak | Spacewatch | · | 910 m | MPC; JPL |
| 685761 | 2009 WM_{280} | — | December 5, 2015 | Haleakala | Pan-STARRS 1 | · | 2.5 km | MPC; JPL |
| 685762 | 2009 WU_{280} | — | December 7, 2015 | Haleakala | Pan-STARRS 1 | TIR | 2.5 km | MPC; JPL |
| 685763 | 2009 WP_{281} | — | October 7, 2013 | Mount Lemmon | Mount Lemmon Survey | · | 1.2 km | MPC; JPL |
| 685764 | 2009 WR_{281} | — | January 15, 2015 | Haleakala | Pan-STARRS 1 | · | 930 m | MPC; JPL |
| 685765 | 2009 WZ_{281} | — | November 24, 2009 | Kitt Peak | Spacewatch | · | 1.1 km | MPC; JPL |
| 685766 | 2009 WJ_{282} | — | October 15, 2017 | Mount Lemmon | Mount Lemmon Survey | EUN | 950 m | MPC; JPL |
| 685767 | 2009 WW_{282} | — | November 17, 2009 | Mount Lemmon | Mount Lemmon Survey | · | 2.7 km | MPC; JPL |
| 685768 | 2009 WZ_{284} | — | November 1, 2013 | Kitt Peak | Spacewatch | · | 750 m | MPC; JPL |
| 685769 | 2009 WB_{285} | — | November 22, 2009 | Kitt Peak | Spacewatch | · | 3.0 km | MPC; JPL |
| 685770 | 2009 WG_{286} | — | November 22, 2009 | Kitt Peak | Spacewatch | · | 1.0 km | MPC; JPL |
| 685771 | 2009 WB_{287} | — | May 9, 2011 | Mount Lemmon | Mount Lemmon Survey | · | 500 m | MPC; JPL |
| 685772 | 2009 WK_{287} | — | November 1, 2013 | Mount Lemmon | Mount Lemmon Survey | · | 970 m | MPC; JPL |
| 685773 | 2009 WE_{288} | — | November 26, 2009 | Mount Lemmon | Mount Lemmon Survey | · | 2.6 km | MPC; JPL |
| 685774 | 2009 WF_{288} | — | November 17, 2009 | Mount Lemmon | Mount Lemmon Survey | · | 2.6 km | MPC; JPL |
| 685775 | 2009 WE_{289} | — | November 24, 2009 | Kitt Peak | Spacewatch | · | 1.3 km | MPC; JPL |
| 685776 | 2009 WS_{291} | — | November 21, 2009 | Kitt Peak | Spacewatch | · | 2.9 km | MPC; JPL |
| 685777 | 2009 WD_{295} | — | November 8, 2009 | Kitt Peak | Spacewatch | · | 2.0 km | MPC; JPL |
| 685778 | 2009 WJ_{299} | — | November 23, 2009 | Mount Lemmon | Mount Lemmon Survey | · | 1.5 km | MPC; JPL |
| 685779 | 2009 WX_{299} | — | November 24, 2009 | Kitt Peak | Spacewatch | · | 1.1 km | MPC; JPL |
| 685780 | 2009 WB_{301} | — | November 24, 2009 | Kitt Peak | Spacewatch | · | 1.3 km | MPC; JPL |
| 685781 | 2009 XD_{2} | — | June 29, 2005 | Kitt Peak | Spacewatch | · | 850 m | MPC; JPL |
| 685782 | 2009 XX_{3} | — | December 10, 2009 | Mount Lemmon | Mount Lemmon Survey | MAR | 830 m | MPC; JPL |
| 685783 | 2009 XP_{4} | — | December 10, 2009 | Mount Lemmon | Mount Lemmon Survey | · | 1.5 km | MPC; JPL |
| 685784 | 2009 XY_{4} | — | December 10, 2009 | Mount Lemmon | Mount Lemmon Survey | · | 1.1 km | MPC; JPL |
| 685785 | 2009 XN_{5} | — | December 10, 2009 | Mount Lemmon | Mount Lemmon Survey | (5) | 980 m | MPC; JPL |
| 685786 | 2009 XX_{6} | — | November 20, 2009 | Kitt Peak | Spacewatch | EOS | 1.8 km | MPC; JPL |
| 685787 | 2009 XM_{12} | — | December 11, 2009 | Catalina | CSS | H | 520 m | MPC; JPL |
| 685788 | 2009 XQ_{21} | — | December 10, 2009 | Mount Lemmon | Mount Lemmon Survey | · | 3.4 km | MPC; JPL |
| 685789 | 2009 XS_{26} | — | November 27, 2013 | Haleakala | Pan-STARRS 1 | · | 930 m | MPC; JPL |
| 685790 | 2009 XY_{26} | — | May 29, 2012 | Mount Lemmon | Mount Lemmon Survey | · | 880 m | MPC; JPL |
| 685791 | 2009 XZ_{26} | — | October 25, 2013 | Mount Lemmon | Mount Lemmon Survey | · | 1 km | MPC; JPL |
| 685792 | 2009 XC_{27} | — | November 26, 2013 | Haleakala | Pan-STARRS 1 | · | 970 m | MPC; JPL |
| 685793 | 2009 YV_{2} | — | December 17, 2009 | Mount Lemmon | Mount Lemmon Survey | · | 1.2 km | MPC; JPL |
| 685794 | 2009 YW_{3} | — | December 17, 2009 | Kitt Peak | Spacewatch | EUN | 890 m | MPC; JPL |
| 685795 | 2009 YX_{6} | — | October 14, 2004 | Moletai | K. Černis, Zdanavicius, J. | · | 2.0 km | MPC; JPL |
| 685796 | 2009 YR_{8} | — | July 30, 2008 | Kitt Peak | Spacewatch | · | 1.5 km | MPC; JPL |
| 685797 | 2009 YR_{12} | — | October 29, 2008 | Mount Lemmon | Mount Lemmon Survey | · | 2.7 km | MPC; JPL |
| 685798 | 2009 YE_{24} | — | December 17, 2009 | Socorro | LINEAR | · | 1.2 km | MPC; JPL |
| 685799 | 2009 YR_{26} | — | December 17, 2009 | Haleakala | Pan-STARRS 1 | cubewano (hot) | 318 km | MPC; JPL |
| 685800 | 2009 YO_{27} | — | May 22, 2011 | Mount Lemmon | Mount Lemmon Survey | · | 570 m | MPC; JPL |

== 685801–685900 ==
back to top

| Designation | | | Discovery | | | Properties | | Ref |
| Permanent | Provisional | Named after | Date | Site | Discoverer(s) | Category | Diam. | Ref |
|---|---|---|---|---|---|---|---|---|
| 685801 | 2009 YZ_{27} | — | December 19, 2009 | Mount Lemmon | Mount Lemmon Survey | · | 540 m | MPC; JPL |
| 685802 | 2009 YC_{28} | — | March 28, 2012 | Kitt Peak | Spacewatch | · | 1.8 km | MPC; JPL |
| 685803 | 2009 YY_{28} | — | December 18, 2009 | Mount Lemmon | Mount Lemmon Survey | · | 1.3 km | MPC; JPL |
| 685804 | 2009 YO_{30} | — | February 12, 2011 | Mount Lemmon | Mount Lemmon Survey | · | 2.4 km | MPC; JPL |
| 685805 | 2009 YN_{31} | — | January 2, 2017 | Haleakala | Pan-STARRS 1 | · | 590 m | MPC; JPL |
| 685806 | 2009 YO_{32} | — | December 18, 2009 | Mount Lemmon | Mount Lemmon Survey | · | 600 m | MPC; JPL |
| 685807 | 2009 YZ_{32} | — | December 18, 2009 | Kitt Peak | Spacewatch | · | 1.3 km | MPC; JPL |
| 685808 | 2009 YE_{33} | — | December 17, 2009 | Mount Lemmon | Mount Lemmon Survey | · | 470 m | MPC; JPL |
| 685809 | 2009 YT_{34} | — | December 18, 2009 | Mount Lemmon | Mount Lemmon Survey | · | 1.6 km | MPC; JPL |
| 685810 | 2010 AL_{7} | — | January 6, 2010 | Kitt Peak | Spacewatch | BRG | 1.3 km | MPC; JPL |
| 685811 | 2010 AT_{14} | — | January 7, 2010 | Mount Lemmon | Mount Lemmon Survey | · | 1.5 km | MPC; JPL |
| 685812 | 2010 AS_{16} | — | January 7, 2010 | Mount Lemmon | Mount Lemmon Survey | (5) | 1.2 km | MPC; JPL |
| 685813 | 2010 AT_{17} | — | January 7, 2010 | Mount Lemmon | Mount Lemmon Survey | · | 540 m | MPC; JPL |
| 685814 | 2010 AG_{29} | — | January 8, 2010 | Mount Lemmon | Mount Lemmon Survey | · | 1.6 km | MPC; JPL |
| 685815 | 2010 AN_{35} | — | October 9, 2008 | Mount Lemmon | Mount Lemmon Survey | · | 1.3 km | MPC; JPL |
| 685816 | 2010 AG_{44} | — | January 23, 2006 | Kitt Peak | Spacewatch | · | 760 m | MPC; JPL |
| 685817 | 2010 AP_{45} | — | January 7, 2010 | Mount Lemmon | Mount Lemmon Survey | · | 1.2 km | MPC; JPL |
| 685818 | 2010 AB_{47} | — | December 15, 2009 | Mount Lemmon | Mount Lemmon Survey | · | 660 m | MPC; JPL |
| 685819 | 2010 AK_{58} | — | September 3, 2008 | Kitt Peak | Spacewatch | · | 1.1 km | MPC; JPL |
| 685820 | 2010 AL_{69} | — | January 12, 2010 | Catalina | CSS | · | 540 m | MPC; JPL |
| 685821 | 2010 AD_{72} | — | December 16, 2009 | Mount Lemmon | Mount Lemmon Survey | · | 990 m | MPC; JPL |
| 685822 | 2010 AZ_{76} | — | January 7, 2010 | Catalina | CSS | · | 1.4 km | MPC; JPL |
| 685823 | 2010 AW_{140} | — | April 13, 2015 | Mount Lemmon | Mount Lemmon Survey | · | 1.2 km | MPC; JPL |
| 685824 | 2010 AU_{141} | — | November 27, 2009 | Kitt Peak | Spacewatch | · | 1.2 km | MPC; JPL |
| 685825 | 2010 AH_{142} | — | January 6, 2010 | Mount Lemmon | Mount Lemmon Survey | MAR | 760 m | MPC; JPL |
| 685826 | 2010 AP_{142} | — | January 6, 2010 | Mount Lemmon | Mount Lemmon Survey | · | 1.3 km | MPC; JPL |
| 685827 | 2010 AB_{154} | — | July 5, 2016 | Mount Lemmon | Mount Lemmon Survey | · | 1.5 km | MPC; JPL |
| 685828 | 2010 AD_{154} | — | December 20, 2009 | Mount Lemmon | Mount Lemmon Survey | · | 580 m | MPC; JPL |
| 685829 | 2010 AH_{154} | — | November 21, 2009 | Kitt Peak | Spacewatch | · | 1.6 km | MPC; JPL |
| 685830 | 2010 AO_{154} | — | November 27, 2013 | Haleakala | Pan-STARRS 1 | · | 1.3 km | MPC; JPL |
| 685831 | 2010 AA_{155} | — | November 8, 2013 | Mount Lemmon | Mount Lemmon Survey | · | 1.3 km | MPC; JPL |
| 685832 | 2010 AJ_{155} | — | July 3, 2011 | Mount Lemmon | Mount Lemmon Survey | · | 1.3 km | MPC; JPL |
| 685833 | 2010 AQ_{155} | — | February 18, 2015 | Haleakala | Pan-STARRS 1 | · | 1.2 km | MPC; JPL |
| 685834 | 2010 AS_{155} | — | June 16, 2012 | Haleakala | Pan-STARRS 1 | · | 1.5 km | MPC; JPL |
| 685835 | 2010 AH_{157} | — | September 15, 2013 | Haleakala | Pan-STARRS 1 | JUN | 930 m | MPC; JPL |
| 685836 | 2010 AJ_{157} | — | January 15, 2010 | Mount Lemmon | Mount Lemmon Survey | · | 1.2 km | MPC; JPL |
| 685837 | 2010 AX_{157} | — | December 25, 2013 | Haleakala | Pan-STARRS 1 | · | 1.4 km | MPC; JPL |
| 685838 | 2010 AK_{158} | — | September 22, 2017 | Haleakala | Pan-STARRS 1 | · | 1.4 km | MPC; JPL |
| 685839 | 2010 AS_{159} | — | March 24, 2015 | Haleakala | Pan-STARRS 1 | · | 1.4 km | MPC; JPL |
| 685840 | 2010 AM_{160} | — | February 16, 2015 | Haleakala | Pan-STARRS 1 | NEM | 1.5 km | MPC; JPL |
| 685841 | 2010 AS_{161} | — | January 15, 2010 | Catalina | CSS | (1547) | 1.2 km | MPC; JPL |
| 685842 | 2010 AT_{163} | — | October 9, 2015 | Haleakala | Pan-STARRS 1 | · | 2.6 km | MPC; JPL |
| 685843 | 2010 AP_{164} | — | January 11, 2010 | Kitt Peak | Spacewatch | · | 1.2 km | MPC; JPL |
| 685844 | 2010 BW_{2} | — | December 17, 2009 | Mount Lemmon | Mount Lemmon Survey | H | 450 m | MPC; JPL |
| 685845 | 2010 BE_{3} | — | January 18, 2010 | Dauban | C. Rinner, Kugel, F. | · | 1.5 km | MPC; JPL |
| 685846 | 2010 BQ_{134} | — | February 14, 2005 | Kitt Peak | Spacewatch | · | 1.2 km | MPC; JPL |
| 685847 | 2010 BV_{134} | — | March 24, 2012 | Mount Lemmon | Mount Lemmon Survey | · | 2.5 km | MPC; JPL |
| 685848 | 2010 BC_{150} | — | January 29, 2010 | WISE | WISE | · | 2.3 km | MPC; JPL |
| 685849 | 2010 CH_{30} | — | February 9, 2010 | Mount Lemmon | Mount Lemmon Survey | · | 480 m | MPC; JPL |
| 685850 | 2010 CY_{34} | — | February 10, 2010 | Kitt Peak | Spacewatch | · | 630 m | MPC; JPL |
| 685851 | 2010 CB_{35} | — | February 10, 2010 | Kitt Peak | Spacewatch | · | 1.6 km | MPC; JPL |
| 685852 | 2010 CW_{37} | — | February 13, 2010 | Mount Lemmon | Mount Lemmon Survey | · | 1.4 km | MPC; JPL |
| 685853 | 2010 CU_{38} | — | February 13, 2010 | Mount Lemmon | Mount Lemmon Survey | · | 550 m | MPC; JPL |
| 685854 | 2010 CX_{62} | — | January 12, 2010 | Mount Lemmon | Mount Lemmon Survey | · | 1.6 km | MPC; JPL |
| 685855 | 2010 CU_{64} | — | February 9, 2010 | Mount Lemmon | Mount Lemmon Survey | · | 1.3 km | MPC; JPL |
| 685856 | 2010 CH_{66} | — | February 9, 2010 | Mount Lemmon | Mount Lemmon Survey | · | 1.3 km | MPC; JPL |
| 685857 | 2010 CR_{73} | — | January 30, 2006 | Kitt Peak | Spacewatch | · | 770 m | MPC; JPL |
| 685858 | 2010 CK_{75} | — | February 13, 2010 | Mount Lemmon | Mount Lemmon Survey | · | 1.2 km | MPC; JPL |
| 685859 | 2010 CJ_{77} | — | February 13, 2010 | Mount Lemmon | Mount Lemmon Survey | · | 550 m | MPC; JPL |
| 685860 | 2010 CZ_{81} | — | February 13, 2010 | Mount Lemmon | Mount Lemmon Survey | EUN | 1.2 km | MPC; JPL |
| 685861 | 2010 CB_{86} | — | October 8, 2008 | Mount Lemmon | Mount Lemmon Survey | · | 1.2 km | MPC; JPL |
| 685862 | 2010 CY_{87} | — | October 10, 2008 | Kitt Peak | Spacewatch | · | 1.3 km | MPC; JPL |
| 685863 | 2010 CC_{91} | — | February 14, 2010 | Mount Lemmon | Mount Lemmon Survey | · | 1.3 km | MPC; JPL |
| 685864 | 2010 CA_{92} | — | February 14, 2010 | Mount Lemmon | Mount Lemmon Survey | · | 770 m | MPC; JPL |
| 685865 | 2010 CO_{99} | — | February 14, 2010 | Mount Lemmon | Mount Lemmon Survey | · | 590 m | MPC; JPL |
| 685866 | 2010 CQ_{99} | — | February 14, 2010 | Mount Lemmon | Mount Lemmon Survey | · | 1.4 km | MPC; JPL |
| 685867 | 2010 CU_{105} | — | September 19, 2007 | Mount Lemmon | Mount Lemmon Survey | · | 1.8 km | MPC; JPL |
| 685868 | 2010 CB_{109} | — | February 14, 2010 | Mount Lemmon | Mount Lemmon Survey | · | 1.5 km | MPC; JPL |
| 685869 | 2010 CW_{111} | — | January 12, 2010 | Kitt Peak | Spacewatch | · | 1.3 km | MPC; JPL |
| 685870 | 2010 CA_{113} | — | February 14, 2010 | Mount Lemmon | Mount Lemmon Survey | HOF | 1.7 km | MPC; JPL |
| 685871 | 2010 CC_{113} | — | February 14, 2010 | Mount Lemmon | Mount Lemmon Survey | · | 1.4 km | MPC; JPL |
| 685872 | 2010 CM_{115} | — | January 30, 2003 | Mount Graham | Ryan, W. | · | 600 m | MPC; JPL |
| 685873 | 2010 CS_{119} | — | January 12, 2010 | Kitt Peak | Spacewatch | EUN | 1.2 km | MPC; JPL |
| 685874 | 2010 CW_{122} | — | February 15, 2010 | Mount Lemmon | Mount Lemmon Survey | · | 590 m | MPC; JPL |
| 685875 | 2010 CK_{126} | — | September 6, 2008 | Catalina | CSS | (5) | 1.2 km | MPC; JPL |
| 685876 | 2010 CO_{153} | — | September 14, 2007 | Mount Lemmon | Mount Lemmon Survey | · | 1.9 km | MPC; JPL |
| 685877 | 2010 CA_{160} | — | February 15, 2010 | Kitt Peak | Spacewatch | · | 1.6 km | MPC; JPL |
| 685878 | 2010 CA_{161} | — | February 9, 2010 | Kitt Peak | Spacewatch | · | 1.5 km | MPC; JPL |
| 685879 | 2010 CQ_{164} | — | February 10, 2010 | Kitt Peak | Spacewatch | · | 1.1 km | MPC; JPL |
| 685880 | 2010 CJ_{165} | — | February 10, 2010 | Kitt Peak | Spacewatch | · | 1.7 km | MPC; JPL |
| 685881 | 2010 CC_{168} | — | February 15, 2010 | Mount Lemmon | Mount Lemmon Survey | · | 490 m | MPC; JPL |
| 685882 | 2010 CE_{171} | — | September 29, 2003 | Kitt Peak | Spacewatch | NEM | 2.1 km | MPC; JPL |
| 685883 | 2010 CJ_{172} | — | February 15, 2010 | Kitt Peak | Spacewatch | · | 570 m | MPC; JPL |
| 685884 | 2010 CT_{176} | — | February 10, 2010 | Kitt Peak | Spacewatch | · | 1.7 km | MPC; JPL |
| 685885 | 2010 CU_{177} | — | October 7, 2008 | Mount Lemmon | Mount Lemmon Survey | AEO | 910 m | MPC; JPL |
| 685886 | 2010 CZ_{178} | — | February 15, 2010 | Mount Lemmon | Mount Lemmon Survey | · | 1.6 km | MPC; JPL |
| 685887 | 2010 CX_{184} | — | September 17, 2003 | Palomar | NEAT | H | 540 m | MPC; JPL |
| 685888 | 2010 CT_{273} | — | March 21, 2015 | Haleakala | Pan-STARRS 1 | MRX | 660 m | MPC; JPL |
| 685889 | 2010 CT_{274} | — | February 9, 2010 | Kitt Peak | Spacewatch | · | 560 m | MPC; JPL |
| 685890 | 2010 CH_{276} | — | February 15, 2010 | Mount Lemmon | Mount Lemmon Survey | · | 490 m | MPC; JPL |
| 685891 | 2010 CT_{276} | — | February 13, 2010 | Mount Lemmon | Mount Lemmon Survey | · | 1.4 km | MPC; JPL |
| 685892 | 2010 DX_{2} | — | September 23, 2008 | Mount Lemmon | Mount Lemmon Survey | · | 1.3 km | MPC; JPL |
| 685893 | 2010 DU_{5} | — | September 18, 2003 | Kitt Peak | Spacewatch | · | 1.5 km | MPC; JPL |
| 685894 | 2010 DO_{11} | — | September 4, 2008 | Kitt Peak | Spacewatch | · | 920 m | MPC; JPL |
| 685895 | 2010 DF_{36} | — | January 11, 2010 | Mount Lemmon | Mount Lemmon Survey | · | 1.4 km | MPC; JPL |
| 685896 | 2010 DQ_{39} | — | February 16, 2010 | Mount Lemmon | Mount Lemmon Survey | · | 1.3 km | MPC; JPL |
| 685897 | 2010 DU_{40} | — | January 12, 2010 | Mount Lemmon | Mount Lemmon Survey | · | 990 m | MPC; JPL |
| 685898 | 2010 DX_{42} | — | September 27, 2008 | Mount Lemmon | Mount Lemmon Survey | · | 1.2 km | MPC; JPL |
| 685899 | 2010 DL_{48} | — | February 17, 2010 | Mount Lemmon | Mount Lemmon Survey | · | 1.4 km | MPC; JPL |
| 685900 | 2010 DS_{74} | — | September 3, 2008 | Kitt Peak | Spacewatch | · | 1.2 km | MPC; JPL |

== 685901–686000 ==
back to top

| Designation | | | Discovery | | | Properties | | Ref |
| Permanent | Provisional | Named after | Date | Site | Discoverer(s) | Category | Diam. | Ref |
|---|---|---|---|---|---|---|---|---|
| 685901 | 2010 DG_{79} | — | February 18, 2010 | Mount Lemmon | Mount Lemmon Survey | · | 570 m | MPC; JPL |
| 685902 | 2010 DY_{91} | — | February 16, 2010 | Palomar | Palomar Transient Factory | · | 1.2 km | MPC; JPL |
| 685903 | 2010 DF_{106} | — | February 21, 2010 | Haleakala | Pan-STARRS 1 | centaur | 137 km | MPC; JPL |
| 685904 | 2010 DQ_{106} | — | March 27, 2015 | Haleakala | Pan-STARRS 1 | · | 1.2 km | MPC; JPL |
| 685905 | 2010 DY_{106} | — | August 13, 2012 | Haleakala | Pan-STARRS 1 | · | 1.3 km | MPC; JPL |
| 685906 | 2010 DC_{107} | — | October 16, 2012 | Mount Lemmon | Mount Lemmon Survey | · | 1.3 km | MPC; JPL |
| 685907 | 2010 DA_{108} | — | February 17, 2010 | Kitt Peak | Spacewatch | · | 1.2 km | MPC; JPL |
| 685908 | 2010 DO_{109} | — | February 17, 2010 | Kitt Peak | Spacewatch | · | 1.6 km | MPC; JPL |
| 685909 | 2010 DZ_{109} | — | May 23, 2014 | Haleakala | Pan-STARRS 1 | · | 610 m | MPC; JPL |
| 685910 | 2010 DL_{110} | — | July 14, 2016 | Haleakala | Pan-STARRS 1 | · | 1.4 km | MPC; JPL |
| 685911 | 2010 DQ_{110} | — | April 25, 2015 | Haleakala | Pan-STARRS 1 | · | 1.2 km | MPC; JPL |
| 685912 | 2010 DR_{110} | — | August 7, 2016 | Haleakala | Pan-STARRS 1 | · | 1.6 km | MPC; JPL |
| 685913 | 2010 DL_{112} | — | February 18, 2010 | Mount Lemmon | Mount Lemmon Survey | · | 1.1 km | MPC; JPL |
| 685914 | 2010 DP_{112} | — | February 17, 2010 | Kitt Peak | Spacewatch | · | 1.0 km | MPC; JPL |
| 685915 | 2010 DS_{112} | — | February 17, 2010 | Kitt Peak | Spacewatch | AEO | 960 m | MPC; JPL |
| 685916 | 2010 DK_{114} | — | February 17, 2010 | Kitt Peak | Spacewatch | · | 1.4 km | MPC; JPL |
| 685917 | 2010 DS_{115} | — | October 29, 2017 | Haleakala | Pan-STARRS 1 | · | 1.2 km | MPC; JPL |
| 685918 | 2010 DO_{116} | — | February 16, 2010 | Kitt Peak | Spacewatch | GEF | 830 m | MPC; JPL |
| 685919 | 2010 EG_{12} | — | March 7, 2010 | Wildberg | R. Apitzsch | · | 710 m | MPC; JPL |
| 685920 | 2010 EB_{41} | — | November 20, 2008 | Kitt Peak | Spacewatch | · | 1.4 km | MPC; JPL |
| 685921 | 2010 ES_{41} | — | March 12, 2010 | Kitt Peak | Spacewatch | HNS | 960 m | MPC; JPL |
| 685922 | 2010 EH_{42} | — | March 9, 2010 | Nogales | M. Schwartz, L. Elenin | · | 1.6 km | MPC; JPL |
| 685923 | 2010 EZ_{66} | — | March 12, 2010 | Kitt Peak | Spacewatch | · | 1.3 km | MPC; JPL |
| 685924 | 2010 EK_{68} | — | March 12, 2010 | Mount Lemmon | Mount Lemmon Survey | · | 1.5 km | MPC; JPL |
| 685925 | 2010 EM_{71} | — | March 13, 2010 | Mount Lemmon | Mount Lemmon Survey | HOF | 1.8 km | MPC; JPL |
| 685926 | 2010 EX_{71} | — | March 13, 2010 | Mount Lemmon | Mount Lemmon Survey | HOF | 2.0 km | MPC; JPL |
| 685927 | 2010 EU_{73} | — | April 17, 1996 | Kitt Peak | Spacewatch | · | 660 m | MPC; JPL |
| 685928 | 2010 EL_{79} | — | March 12, 2010 | Mount Lemmon | Mount Lemmon Survey | · | 1.4 km | MPC; JPL |
| 685929 | 2010 ER_{79} | — | May 4, 2006 | Mount Lemmon | Mount Lemmon Survey | · | 1.4 km | MPC; JPL |
| 685930 | 2010 EF_{88} | — | March 14, 2010 | Kitt Peak | Spacewatch | · | 1.4 km | MPC; JPL |
| 685931 | 2010 EP_{89} | — | March 14, 2010 | Kitt Peak | Spacewatch | · | 650 m | MPC; JPL |
| 685932 | 2010 EL_{94} | — | October 30, 2005 | Kitt Peak | Spacewatch | · | 480 m | MPC; JPL |
| 685933 | 2010 EA_{96} | — | March 14, 2010 | Mount Lemmon | Mount Lemmon Survey | · | 1.3 km | MPC; JPL |
| 685934 | 2010 EL_{101} | — | March 15, 2010 | Mount Lemmon | Mount Lemmon Survey | · | 1.4 km | MPC; JPL |
| 685935 | 2010 EE_{106} | — | November 8, 2008 | Mount Lemmon | Mount Lemmon Survey | JUN | 960 m | MPC; JPL |
| 685936 | 2010 EP_{123} | — | September 12, 2007 | Mount Lemmon | Mount Lemmon Survey | AEO | 1.1 km | MPC; JPL |
| 685937 | 2010 EU_{131} | — | March 15, 2010 | Kitt Peak | Spacewatch | · | 1.2 km | MPC; JPL |
| 685938 | 2010 ER_{133} | — | March 15, 2010 | Kitt Peak | Spacewatch | · | 1.7 km | MPC; JPL |
| 685939 | 2010 EY_{137} | — | March 7, 2017 | Mount Lemmon | Mount Lemmon Survey | · | 590 m | MPC; JPL |
| 685940 | 2010 ET_{141} | — | March 13, 2010 | Mount Lemmon | Mount Lemmon Survey | CLO | 1.4 km | MPC; JPL |
| 685941 | 2010 EP_{177} | — | August 26, 2016 | Haleakala | Pan-STARRS 1 | · | 950 m | MPC; JPL |
| 685942 | 2010 ER_{188} | — | March 14, 2010 | Kitt Peak | Spacewatch | · | 1.8 km | MPC; JPL |
| 685943 | 2010 EX_{189} | — | March 4, 2010 | Kitt Peak | Spacewatch | · | 470 m | MPC; JPL |
| 685944 | 2010 EF_{190} | — | March 13, 2010 | Mount Lemmon | Mount Lemmon Survey | MRX | 810 m | MPC; JPL |
| 685945 | 2010 EL_{190} | — | February 3, 2017 | Haleakala | Pan-STARRS 1 | · | 550 m | MPC; JPL |
| 685946 | 2010 FF | — | September 16, 2004 | Kitt Peak | Spacewatch | · | 310 m | MPC; JPL |
| 685947 | 2010 FT_{1} | — | November 6, 2005 | Mount Lemmon | Mount Lemmon Survey | · | 470 m | MPC; JPL |
| 685948 | 2010 FB_{3} | — | October 1, 2008 | Mount Lemmon | Mount Lemmon Survey | (5) | 1.6 km | MPC; JPL |
| 685949 | 2010 FO_{6} | — | September 21, 2008 | Mount Lemmon | Mount Lemmon Survey | · | 560 m | MPC; JPL |
| 685950 | 2010 FZ_{11} | — | February 21, 2003 | Palomar | NEAT | · | 580 m | MPC; JPL |
| 685951 | 2010 FT_{15} | — | March 23, 2006 | Kitt Peak | Spacewatch | · | 910 m | MPC; JPL |
| 685952 | 2010 FO_{17} | — | March 18, 2010 | Mount Lemmon | Mount Lemmon Survey | · | 1.4 km | MPC; JPL |
| 685953 | 2010 FY_{18} | — | March 18, 2010 | Mount Lemmon | Mount Lemmon Survey | · | 580 m | MPC; JPL |
| 685954 | 2010 FC_{23} | — | September 12, 2007 | Mount Lemmon | Mount Lemmon Survey | HOF | 2.0 km | MPC; JPL |
| 685955 | 2010 FM_{23} | — | March 18, 2010 | Mount Lemmon | Mount Lemmon Survey | · | 610 m | MPC; JPL |
| 685956 | 2010 FD_{26} | — | March 19, 2010 | Mount Lemmon | Mount Lemmon Survey | PAD | 1.1 km | MPC; JPL |
| 685957 | 2010 FK_{29} | — | March 20, 2010 | Mount Lemmon | Mount Lemmon Survey | · | 1.5 km | MPC; JPL |
| 685958 | 2010 FZ_{54} | — | March 21, 2010 | Kitt Peak | Spacewatch | · | 560 m | MPC; JPL |
| 685959 | 2010 FU_{82} | — | April 5, 2005 | Palomar | NEAT | TEL | 1.9 km | MPC; JPL |
| 685960 | 2010 FV_{83} | — | March 13, 2010 | Kitt Peak | Spacewatch | · | 890 m | MPC; JPL |
| 685961 | 2010 FV_{95} | — | March 18, 2010 | Mount Lemmon | Mount Lemmon Survey | · | 1.2 km | MPC; JPL |
| 685962 | 2010 FF_{100} | — | March 18, 2010 | Kitt Peak | Spacewatch | · | 710 m | MPC; JPL |
| 685963 | 2010 FY_{126} | — | September 21, 2017 | Haleakala | Pan-STARRS 1 | ADE | 1.6 km | MPC; JPL |
| 685964 | 2010 FE_{128} | — | October 3, 2013 | Mount Lemmon | Mount Lemmon Survey | · | 1.5 km | MPC; JPL |
| 685965 | 2010 FN_{130} | — | January 16, 2017 | Haleakala | Pan-STARRS 1 | · | 2.4 km | MPC; JPL |
| 685966 | 2010 FS_{137} | — | March 18, 2010 | Kitt Peak | Spacewatch | · | 1.8 km | MPC; JPL |
| 685967 | 2010 FH_{139} | — | November 7, 2015 | Mount Lemmon | Mount Lemmon Survey | · | 490 m | MPC; JPL |
| 685968 | 2010 FW_{140} | — | March 22, 2015 | Haleakala | Pan-STARRS 1 | · | 1.5 km | MPC; JPL |
| 685969 | 2010 FP_{141} | — | March 16, 2010 | Mount Lemmon | Mount Lemmon Survey | · | 870 m | MPC; JPL |
| 685970 | 2010 FZ_{141} | — | April 20, 2015 | Haleakala | Pan-STARRS 1 | GEF | 850 m | MPC; JPL |
| 685971 | 2010 FA_{143} | — | March 17, 2010 | Mount Lemmon | Mount Lemmon Survey | HNS | 1 km | MPC; JPL |
| 685972 | 2010 FD_{143} | — | March 21, 2010 | Kitt Peak | Spacewatch | · | 1.7 km | MPC; JPL |
| 685973 | 2010 FJ_{143} | — | March 19, 2010 | Mount Lemmon | Mount Lemmon Survey | · | 1.1 km | MPC; JPL |
| 685974 | 2010 FQ_{145} | — | March 20, 2010 | Kitt Peak | Spacewatch | · | 1.5 km | MPC; JPL |
| 685975 | 2010 FB_{146} | — | March 19, 2010 | Mount Lemmon | Mount Lemmon Survey | AGN | 830 m | MPC; JPL |
| 685976 | 2010 GO_{23} | — | April 5, 2010 | Sandlot | G. Hug | DOR | 1.8 km | MPC; JPL |
| 685977 | 2010 GR_{97} | — | April 8, 2010 | Kitt Peak | Spacewatch | · | 1.0 km | MPC; JPL |
| 685978 | 2010 GG_{101} | — | April 5, 2010 | Kitt Peak | Spacewatch | · | 1.8 km | MPC; JPL |
| 685979 | 2010 GN_{101} | — | March 26, 2001 | Kitt Peak | Deep Ecliptic Survey | · | 1.5 km | MPC; JPL |
| 685980 | 2010 GH_{109} | — | April 8, 2010 | XuYi | PMO NEO Survey Program | EUN | 1.5 km | MPC; JPL |
| 685981 | 2010 GW_{120} | — | September 13, 2007 | Mount Lemmon | Mount Lemmon Survey | · | 1.3 km | MPC; JPL |
| 685982 | 2010 GX_{121} | — | April 12, 2010 | Mount Lemmon | Mount Lemmon Survey | · | 500 m | MPC; JPL |
| 685983 | 2010 GN_{122} | — | April 13, 2010 | Mount Lemmon | Mount Lemmon Survey | · | 1.6 km | MPC; JPL |
| 685984 | 2010 GD_{126} | — | April 10, 2010 | Kitt Peak | Spacewatch | · | 1.1 km | MPC; JPL |
| 685985 | 2010 GF_{129} | — | February 14, 2010 | Kitt Peak | Spacewatch | · | 590 m | MPC; JPL |
| 685986 | 2010 GV_{129} | — | April 7, 2010 | Kitt Peak | Spacewatch | · | 1.6 km | MPC; JPL |
| 685987 | 2010 GH_{132} | — | April 10, 2010 | Mount Lemmon | Mount Lemmon Survey | · | 500 m | MPC; JPL |
| 685988 | 2010 GA_{133} | — | April 10, 2010 | Kitt Peak | Spacewatch | · | 670 m | MPC; JPL |
| 685989 | 2010 GD_{139} | — | April 7, 2010 | Kitt Peak | Spacewatch | · | 1.7 km | MPC; JPL |
| 685990 | 2010 GR_{139} | — | April 7, 2010 | Mount Lemmon | Mount Lemmon Survey | · | 570 m | MPC; JPL |
| 685991 | 2010 GP_{140} | — | April 1, 2003 | Kitt Peak | Deep Ecliptic Survey | · | 510 m | MPC; JPL |
| 685992 | 2010 GJ_{142} | — | April 9, 2010 | Kitt Peak | Spacewatch | · | 1.8 km | MPC; JPL |
| 685993 | 2010 GQ_{182} | — | April 18, 2015 | Cerro Tololo | DECam | · | 1.3 km | MPC; JPL |
| 685994 | 2010 GR_{200} | — | May 13, 2015 | Haleakala | Pan-STARRS 1 | · | 1.5 km | MPC; JPL |
| 685995 | 2010 GW_{200} | — | June 11, 2015 | Haleakala | Pan-STARRS 1 | HOF | 2.2 km | MPC; JPL |
| 685996 | 2010 GQ_{202} | — | April 25, 2015 | Haleakala | Pan-STARRS 1 | · | 1.5 km | MPC; JPL |
| 685997 | 2010 GZ_{204} | — | August 10, 2016 | Haleakala | Pan-STARRS 1 | · | 1.4 km | MPC; JPL |
| 685998 | 2010 GO_{205} | — | April 9, 2010 | Mount Lemmon | Mount Lemmon Survey | · | 580 m | MPC; JPL |
| 685999 | 2010 GH_{207} | — | April 7, 2010 | Mount Lemmon | Mount Lemmon Survey | · | 1.3 km | MPC; JPL |
| 686000 | 2010 GL_{207} | — | April 15, 2010 | Mount Lemmon | Mount Lemmon Survey | AGN | 1.1 km | MPC; JPL |

back to top

== See also ==
- Meanings of minor-planet names: 685001–686000
