= List of minor planets: 724001–725000 =

The following is a partial list of minor planets, running from minor-planet number 724001 through 725000, inclusive. The primary data for this and other partial lists is based on JPL's "Small-Body Orbital Elements" and data available from the Minor Planet Center. Critical list information is also provided by the MPC, unless otherwise specified from Lowell Observatory. A detailed description of the table's columns and additional sources are given on the main page including a complete list of every page in this series, and a statistical break-up on the dynamical classification of minor planets.

Also see the summary list of all named bodies in numerical and alphabetical order, and the corresponding naming citations for the number range of this particular list. New namings may only be added to this list after official publication, as the preannouncement of names is condemned by the Working Group for Small Bodies Nomenclature of the International Astronomical Union.

Near-Earth obj.	MBA (inner)	MBA (outer)	Centaur
Mars-crosser	MBA (middle)	Jupiter trojan	Trans-Neptunian obj.
Unclassified

== 724001–724100 ==
Designation			Discovery			Properties		Ref
Permanent	Provisional	Named after	Date	Site	Discoverer(s)	Category	Diam.	Ref
724001	2007 TY_{86}	—	October 8, 2007	Mount Lemmon	Mount Lemmon Survey	·	2.5 km	MPC · JPL
724002	2007 TD_{87}	—	October 8, 2007	Mount Lemmon	Mount Lemmon Survey	·	2.8 km	MPC · JPL
724003	2007 TX_{88}	—	October 8, 2007	Mount Lemmon	Mount Lemmon Survey	(45637)	2.8 km	MPC · JPL
724004	2007 TK_{92}	—	October 5, 2007	Kitt Peak	Spacewatch	·	2.7 km	MPC · JPL
724005	2007 TE_{97}	—	May 5, 2010	Mount Lemmon	Mount Lemmon Survey	·	1.1 km	MPC · JPL
724006	2007 TJ_{97}	—	October 8, 2007	Mount Lemmon	Mount Lemmon Survey	EOS	1.3 km	MPC · JPL
724007	2007 TL_{101}	—	October 8, 2007	Mount Lemmon	Mount Lemmon Survey	·	1.4 km	MPC · JPL
724008	2007 TY_{102}	—	October 8, 2007	Mount Lemmon	Mount Lemmon Survey	·	1.4 km	MPC · JPL
724009	2007 TF_{106}	—	October 14, 2007	Front Royal	Skillman, D.	·	2.7 km	MPC · JPL
724010	2007 TT_{117}	—	October 9, 2007	Kitt Peak	Spacewatch	·	2.6 km	MPC · JPL
724011	2007 TL_{120}	—	January 31, 2004	Apache Point	SDSS Collaboration	·	3.3 km	MPC · JPL
724012	2007 TV_{124}	—	October 6, 2007	Kitt Peak	Spacewatch	·	540 m	MPC · JPL
724013	2007 TY_{124}	—	October 6, 2007	Kitt Peak	Spacewatch	·	1.8 km	MPC · JPL
724014	2007 TS_{131}	—	October 7, 2007	Mount Lemmon	Mount Lemmon Survey	·	1.4 km	MPC · JPL
724015	2007 TW_{132}	—	October 7, 2007	Mount Lemmon	Mount Lemmon Survey	·	2.8 km	MPC · JPL
724016	2007 TY_{136}	—	October 8, 2007	Catalina	CSS	·	1.3 km	MPC · JPL
724017	2007 TF_{139}	—	April 12, 1999	Kitt Peak	Spacewatch	·	3.5 km	MPC · JPL
724018	2007 TO_{141}	—	October 9, 2007	Mount Lemmon	Mount Lemmon Survey	·	780 m	MPC · JPL
724019	2007 TS_{143}	—	September 12, 2007	Mount Lemmon	Mount Lemmon Survey	·	650 m	MPC · JPL
724020	2007 TE_{161}	—	October 4, 2007	Catalina	CSS	·	2.3 km	MPC · JPL
724021	2007 TB_{169}	—	October 11, 2007	Kitt Peak	Spacewatch	·	690 m	MPC · JPL
724022	2007 TT_{172}	—	October 10, 2007	Mount Lemmon	Mount Lemmon Survey	·	520 m	MPC · JPL
724023	2007 TF_{191}	—	October 4, 2007	Mount Lemmon	Mount Lemmon Survey	·	1.6 km	MPC · JPL
724024	2007 TU_{192}	—	October 5, 2007	Kitt Peak	Spacewatch	·	2.3 km	MPC · JPL
724025	2007 TV_{192}	—	October 5, 2007	Kitt Peak	Spacewatch	LIX	3.4 km	MPC · JPL
724026	2007 TB_{196}	—	October 7, 2007	Mount Lemmon	Mount Lemmon Survey	·	2.9 km	MPC · JPL
724027	2007 TC_{206}	—	October 11, 2007	Mount Lemmon	Mount Lemmon Survey	·	610 m	MPC · JPL
724028	2007 TU_{207}	—	October 10, 2007	Mount Lemmon	Mount Lemmon Survey	MAR	820 m	MPC · JPL
724029	2007 TV_{208}	—	October 10, 2007	Mount Lemmon	Mount Lemmon Survey	·	2.5 km	MPC · JPL
724030	2007 TK_{216}	—	September 26, 2007	Mount Lemmon	Mount Lemmon Survey	·	3.2 km	MPC · JPL
724031	2007 TY_{216}	—	October 7, 2007	Kitt Peak	Spacewatch	·	1.2 km	MPC · JPL
724032	2007 TH_{220}	—	October 8, 2007	Mount Lemmon	Mount Lemmon Survey	EOS	1.7 km	MPC · JPL
724033	2007 TQ_{221}	—	September 10, 2007	Mount Lemmon	Mount Lemmon Survey	THM	2.3 km	MPC · JPL
724034	2007 TF_{224}	—	October 10, 2007	Mount Lemmon	Mount Lemmon Survey	·	1.6 km	MPC · JPL
724035	2007 TC_{231}	—	October 8, 2007	Kitt Peak	Spacewatch	·	620 m	MPC · JPL
724036	2007 TP_{231}	—	October 8, 2007	Mount Lemmon	Mount Lemmon Survey	·	1.0 km	MPC · JPL
724037	2007 TC_{239}	—	April 4, 2005	Mount Lemmon	Mount Lemmon Survey	EOS	1.7 km	MPC · JPL
724038	2007 TM_{241}	—	October 7, 2007	Mount Lemmon	Mount Lemmon Survey	·	1.2 km	MPC · JPL
724039	2007 TN_{245}	—	October 8, 2007	Mount Lemmon	Mount Lemmon Survey	·	2.4 km	MPC · JPL
724040	2007 TL_{248}	—	December 22, 2008	Catalina	CSS	·	1.7 km	MPC · JPL
724041	2007 TH_{249}	—	October 11, 2007	Mount Lemmon	Mount Lemmon Survey	·	1.6 km	MPC · JPL
724042	2007 TS_{254}	—	October 9, 2007	Kitt Peak	Spacewatch	·	2.5 km	MPC · JPL
724043	2007 TK_{255}	—	October 10, 2007	Kitt Peak	Spacewatch	·	950 m	MPC · JPL
724044	2007 TX_{258}	—	October 10, 2007	Mount Lemmon	Mount Lemmon Survey	·	2.6 km	MPC · JPL
724045	2007 TZ_{258}	—	October 10, 2007	Mount Lemmon	Mount Lemmon Survey	·	1.1 km	MPC · JPL
724046	2007 TF_{259}	—	September 14, 2007	Mount Lemmon	Mount Lemmon Survey	·	2.8 km	MPC · JPL
724047	2007 TW_{263}	—	October 11, 2007	Kitt Peak	Spacewatch	·	1.2 km	MPC · JPL
724048	2007 TR_{272}	—	October 9, 2007	Kitt Peak	Spacewatch	·	1.0 km	MPC · JPL
724049	2007 TP_{273}	—	October 10, 2007	Mount Lemmon	Mount Lemmon Survey	·	1.3 km	MPC · JPL
724050	2007 TR_{275}	—	October 11, 2007	Mount Lemmon	Mount Lemmon Survey	·	2.4 km	MPC · JPL
724051	2007 TZ_{276}	—	October 11, 2007	Mount Lemmon	Mount Lemmon Survey	·	2.0 km	MPC · JPL
724052	2007 TD_{278}	—	October 11, 2007	Mount Lemmon	Mount Lemmon Survey	·	570 m	MPC · JPL
724053	2007 TB_{280}	—	September 10, 2007	Catalina	CSS	T_{j} (2.97)	4.0 km	MPC · JPL
724054	2007 TJ_{281}	—	September 9, 2007	Kitt Peak	Spacewatch	·	2.7 km	MPC · JPL
724055	2007 TX_{284}	—	September 24, 2007	Kitt Peak	Spacewatch	·	820 m	MPC · JPL
724056	2007 TT_{292}	—	September 12, 2007	Mount Lemmon	Mount Lemmon Survey	THM	2.0 km	MPC · JPL
724057	2007 TZ_{292}	—	September 12, 2007	Mount Lemmon	Mount Lemmon Survey	·	2.4 km	MPC · JPL
724058	2007 TF_{294}	—	September 15, 2007	Kitt Peak	Spacewatch	·	1.0 km	MPC · JPL
724059	2007 TR_{298}	—	October 12, 2007	Kitt Peak	Spacewatch	·	1 km	MPC · JPL
724060	2007 TG_{299}	—	October 12, 2007	Kitt Peak	Spacewatch	·	2.4 km	MPC · JPL
724061	2007 TB_{310}	—	October 11, 2007	Kitt Peak	Spacewatch	·	2.8 km	MPC · JPL
724062	2007 TB_{314}	—	October 11, 2007	Mount Lemmon	Mount Lemmon Survey	·	2.5 km	MPC · JPL
724063	2007 TZ_{320}	—	October 15, 2007	Kitt Peak	Spacewatch	·	1.2 km	MPC · JPL
724064	2007 TP_{322}	—	October 11, 2007	Kitt Peak	Spacewatch	·	1 km	MPC · JPL
724065	2007 TG_{323}	—	March 2, 2006	Mount Lemmon	Mount Lemmon Survey	·	1.5 km	MPC · JPL
724066	2007 TT_{324}	—	October 11, 2007	Kitt Peak	Spacewatch	·	2.5 km	MPC · JPL
724067	2007 TM_{326}	—	October 5, 2007	Kitt Peak	Spacewatch	LIX	3.3 km	MPC · JPL
724068	2007 TH_{333}	—	October 7, 2007	Kitt Peak	Spacewatch	·	3.3 km	MPC · JPL
724069	2007 TK_{333}	—	October 11, 2007	Kitt Peak	Spacewatch	PHO	790 m	MPC · JPL
724070	2007 TT_{336}	—	August 23, 2007	Kitt Peak	Spacewatch	·	1.5 km	MPC · JPL
724071	2007 TJ_{339}	—	September 10, 2007	Mount Lemmon	Mount Lemmon Survey	·	2.6 km	MPC · JPL
724072	2007 TY_{339}	—	September 12, 2007	Kitt Peak	Spacewatch	·	3.0 km	MPC · JPL
724073	2007 TA_{340}	—	August 24, 2007	Kitt Peak	Spacewatch	·	2.5 km	MPC · JPL
724074	2007 TE_{341}	—	October 9, 2007	Mount Lemmon	Mount Lemmon Survey	·	960 m	MPC · JPL
724075	2007 TH_{343}	—	October 10, 2007	Mount Lemmon	Mount Lemmon Survey	·	2.4 km	MPC · JPL
724076	2007 TF_{344}	—	October 10, 2007	Mount Lemmon	Mount Lemmon Survey	VER	2.1 km	MPC · JPL
724077	2007 TX_{344}	—	October 11, 2007	Mount Lemmon	Mount Lemmon Survey	·	2.1 km	MPC · JPL
724078	2007 TV_{345}	—	September 14, 2007	Mount Lemmon	Mount Lemmon Survey	·	2.0 km	MPC · JPL
724079	2007 TR_{348}	—	September 22, 2003	Palomar	NEAT	·	1.4 km	MPC · JPL
724080	2007 TM_{351}	—	October 15, 2007	Mount Lemmon	Mount Lemmon Survey	·	2.7 km	MPC · JPL
724081	2007 TQ_{353}	—	September 11, 2007	Kitt Peak	Spacewatch	·	1.3 km	MPC · JPL
724082	2007 TT_{368}	—	October 11, 2007	Mount Lemmon	Mount Lemmon Survey	·	970 m	MPC · JPL
724083	2007 TA_{373}	—	March 16, 2004	Kitt Peak	Spacewatch	·	2.7 km	MPC · JPL
724084	2007 TK_{374}	—	September 13, 2007	Kitt Peak	Spacewatch	·	460 m	MPC · JPL
724085	2007 TN_{374}	—	October 7, 2007	Mount Lemmon	Mount Lemmon Survey	·	2.4 km	MPC · JPL
724086	2007 TA_{375}	—	October 15, 2007	Mount Lemmon	Mount Lemmon Survey	·	1.2 km	MPC · JPL
724087	2007 TZ_{379}	—	October 14, 2007	Kitt Peak	Spacewatch	·	1.5 km	MPC · JPL
724088	2007 TZ_{386}	—	September 14, 2007	Mount Lemmon	Mount Lemmon Survey	·	2.3 km	MPC · JPL
724089	2007 TG_{390}	—	September 13, 2007	Mount Lemmon	Mount Lemmon Survey	·	2.4 km	MPC · JPL
724090	2007 TQ_{394}	—	October 15, 2007	Kitt Peak	Spacewatch	·	2.4 km	MPC · JPL
724091	2007 TC_{396}	—	October 15, 2007	Kitt Peak	Spacewatch	·	2.1 km	MPC · JPL
724092	2007 TX_{398}	—	October 11, 2007	Kitt Peak	Spacewatch	·	1.2 km	MPC · JPL
724093	2007 TA_{409}	—	October 15, 2007	Mount Lemmon	Mount Lemmon Survey	·	1.1 km	MPC · JPL
724094	2007 TH_{409}	—	October 15, 2007	Mount Lemmon	Mount Lemmon Survey	·	460 m	MPC · JPL
724095	2007 TC_{422}	—	October 14, 2007	Kitt Peak	Spacewatch	·	2.2 km	MPC · JPL
724096	2007 TW_{432}	—	October 8, 2007	Kitt Peak	Spacewatch	·	2.7 km	MPC · JPL
724097	2007 TC_{433}	—	September 18, 2001	Apache Point	SDSS Collaboration	VER	2.8 km	MPC · JPL
724098	2007 TQ_{433}	—	October 11, 2007	Catalina	CSS	·	950 m	MPC · JPL
724099	2007 TF_{437}	—	September 12, 2007	Kitt Peak	Spacewatch	·	2.4 km	MPC · JPL
724100	2007 TL_{437}	—	October 12, 2007	Kitt Peak	Spacewatch	·	1.1 km	MPC · JPL

== 724101–724200 ==
back to top

Designation			Discovery			Properties		Ref
Permanent	Provisional	Named after	Date	Site	Discoverer(s)	Category	Diam.	Ref
724101	2007 TP_{447}	—	October 20, 2007	Catalina	CSS	·	3.2 km	MPC · JPL
724102	2007 TQ_{449}	—	October 10, 2007	Catalina	CSS	·	660 m	MPC · JPL
724103	2007 TK_{451}	—	October 15, 2007	Junk Bond	D. Healy	HYG	2.5 km	MPC · JPL
724104	2007 TV_{454}	—	October 22, 2012	Haleakala	Pan-STARRS 1	·	1.5 km	MPC · JPL
724105	2007 TZ_{454}	—	December 31, 1999	Kitt Peak	Spacewatch	L4	9.9 km	MPC · JPL
724106	2007 TJ_{457}	—	October 8, 2007	Mount Lemmon	Mount Lemmon Survey	·	2.7 km	MPC · JPL
724107	2007 TQ_{460}	—	October 9, 2007	Mount Lemmon	Mount Lemmon Survey	·	2.3 km	MPC · JPL
724108	2007 TU_{460}	—	February 19, 2010	Kitt Peak	Spacewatch	·	3.3 km	MPC · JPL
724109	2007 TC_{461}	—	October 11, 2007	Kitt Peak	Spacewatch	·	2.7 km	MPC · JPL
724110	2007 TA_{462}	—	October 8, 2007	Mount Lemmon	Mount Lemmon Survey	·	2.2 km	MPC · JPL
724111	2007 TL_{462}	—	October 9, 2007	Kitt Peak	Spacewatch	·	1.5 km	MPC · JPL
724112	2007 TN_{462}	—	May 1, 2006	Kitt Peak	Spacewatch	LIX	2.5 km	MPC · JPL
724113	2007 TB_{464}	—	October 12, 2007	Mount Lemmon	Mount Lemmon Survey	·	2.3 km	MPC · JPL
724114	2007 TL_{464}	—	October 9, 2007	Kitt Peak	Spacewatch	·	1.3 km	MPC · JPL
724115	2007 TS_{464}	—	February 26, 2010	WISE	WISE	·	1.2 km	MPC · JPL
724116	2007 TS_{467}	—	October 9, 2007	Mount Lemmon	Mount Lemmon Survey	·	2.8 km	MPC · JPL
724117	2007 TT_{467}	—	October 9, 2007	Mount Lemmon	Mount Lemmon Survey	·	690 m	MPC · JPL
724118	2007 TC_{468}	—	October 14, 2007	Mount Lemmon	Mount Lemmon Survey	VER	2.2 km	MPC · JPL
724119	2007 TM_{468}	—	October 13, 2007	Kitt Peak	Spacewatch	·	1.6 km	MPC · JPL
724120	2007 TS_{468}	—	October 21, 2017	Mount Lemmon	Mount Lemmon Survey	·	510 m	MPC · JPL
724121	2007 TU_{468}	—	February 27, 2015	Haleakala	Pan-STARRS 1	EOS	1.4 km	MPC · JPL
724122	2007 TV_{468}	—	October 9, 2007	Kitt Peak	Spacewatch	·	2.3 km	MPC · JPL
724123	2007 TA_{470}	—	October 14, 2007	Mount Lemmon	Mount Lemmon Survey	EOS	1.6 km	MPC · JPL
724124	2007 TD_{470}	—	October 9, 2007	Mount Lemmon	Mount Lemmon Survey	·	2.1 km	MPC · JPL
724125	2007 TP_{470}	—	October 14, 2007	Mount Lemmon	Mount Lemmon Survey	EOS	1.7 km	MPC · JPL
724126	2007 TY_{472}	—	January 19, 2010	WISE	WISE	LUT	3.9 km	MPC · JPL
724127	2007 TW_{473}	—	October 15, 2007	Kitt Peak	Spacewatch	·	1.5 km	MPC · JPL
724128	2007 TE_{474}	—	July 23, 2015	Haleakala	Pan-STARRS 1	·	1.1 km	MPC · JPL
724129	2007 TL_{476}	—	October 10, 2007	Kitt Peak	Spacewatch	·	1.9 km	MPC · JPL
724130	2007 TN_{477}	—	February 14, 2010	Kitt Peak	Spacewatch	·	2.5 km	MPC · JPL
724131	2007 TX_{477}	—	August 8, 2012	Haleakala	Pan-STARRS 1	·	1.5 km	MPC · JPL
724132	2007 TZ_{479}	—	September 11, 2007	XuYi	PMO NEO Survey Program	·	1.3 km	MPC · JPL
724133	2007 TJ_{481}	—	October 8, 2007	Kitt Peak	Spacewatch	·	2.7 km	MPC · JPL
724134	2007 TR_{481}	—	October 10, 2007	Mount Lemmon	Mount Lemmon Survey	·	2.0 km	MPC · JPL
724135	2007 TB_{482}	—	October 8, 2007	Mount Lemmon	Mount Lemmon Survey	·	1.2 km	MPC · JPL
724136	2007 TH_{482}	—	October 14, 2007	Mount Lemmon	Mount Lemmon Survey	·	1.9 km	MPC · JPL
724137	2007 TJ_{485}	—	October 9, 2007	Kitt Peak	Spacewatch	WIT	790 m	MPC · JPL
724138	2007 TU_{485}	—	October 10, 2007	Mount Lemmon	Mount Lemmon Survey	·	2.8 km	MPC · JPL
724139	2007 TJ_{487}	—	October 7, 2007	Mount Lemmon	Mount Lemmon Survey	·	1.9 km	MPC · JPL
724140	2007 TM_{488}	—	October 15, 2007	Mount Lemmon	Mount Lemmon Survey	·	1.2 km	MPC · JPL
724141	2007 TV_{490}	—	October 15, 2007	Mount Lemmon	Mount Lemmon Survey	·	1.2 km	MPC · JPL
724142	2007 TU_{491}	—	October 10, 2007	Kitt Peak	Spacewatch	(5)	1.1 km	MPC · JPL
724143	2007 TR_{492}	—	October 12, 2007	Mount Lemmon	Mount Lemmon Survey	·	1.2 km	MPC · JPL
724144	2007 TX_{492}	—	October 9, 2007	Kitt Peak	Spacewatch	·	1.1 km	MPC · JPL
724145	2007 TE_{494}	—	October 11, 2007	Kitt Peak	Spacewatch	·	2.7 km	MPC · JPL
724146	2007 TG_{494}	—	October 11, 2007	Kitt Peak	Spacewatch	·	1.0 km	MPC · JPL
724147	2007 TB_{495}	—	October 7, 2007	Mount Lemmon	Mount Lemmon Survey	·	1.9 km	MPC · JPL
724148	2007 UC_{5}	—	October 6, 2007	7300	W. K. Y. Yeung	·	740 m	MPC · JPL
724149	2007 UM_{6}	—	June 15, 2002	Palomar	NEAT	·	1.8 km	MPC · JPL
724150	2007 UU_{9}	—	September 21, 2007	XuYi	PMO NEO Survey Program	EUN	1.2 km	MPC · JPL
724151	2007 UG_{19}	—	September 14, 2007	Mount Lemmon	Mount Lemmon Survey	·	2.3 km	MPC · JPL
724152	2007 UT_{19}	—	October 20, 2003	Kitt Peak	Spacewatch	·	1.2 km	MPC · JPL
724153	2007 UP_{22}	—	October 12, 2007	Kitt Peak	Spacewatch	THM	1.9 km	MPC · JPL
724154	2007 UT_{26}	—	October 16, 2007	Mount Lemmon	Mount Lemmon Survey	EOS	1.8 km	MPC · JPL
724155	2007 UK_{32}	—	September 22, 1995	Kitt Peak	Spacewatch	·	2.5 km	MPC · JPL
724156	2007 UC_{39}	—	October 20, 2007	Mount Lemmon	Mount Lemmon Survey	EOS	1.6 km	MPC · JPL
724157	2007 UP_{39}	—	October 20, 2007	Mount Lemmon	Mount Lemmon Survey	·	2.9 km	MPC · JPL
724158	2007 UZ_{48}	—	October 21, 2007	Kitt Peak	Spacewatch	·	2.4 km	MPC · JPL
724159	2007 UO_{56}	—	October 6, 2007	Kitt Peak	Spacewatch	PHO	760 m	MPC · JPL
724160	2007 UA_{74}	—	October 31, 2007	Mount Lemmon	Mount Lemmon Survey	·	2.3 km	MPC · JPL
724161	2007 UJ_{77}	—	October 31, 2007	Mount Lemmon	Mount Lemmon Survey	·	2.6 km	MPC · JPL
724162	2007 UO_{77}	—	October 30, 2007	Kitt Peak	Spacewatch	(5)	940 m	MPC · JPL
724163	2007 UV_{78}	—	October 30, 2007	Mount Lemmon	Mount Lemmon Survey	·	1.2 km	MPC · JPL
724164	2007 UW_{87}	—	October 14, 2007	Mount Lemmon	Mount Lemmon Survey	·	1.4 km	MPC · JPL
724165	2007 UY_{88}	—	October 16, 2007	Kitt Peak	Spacewatch	WIT	720 m	MPC · JPL
724166	2007 UP_{89}	—	October 15, 2007	Catalina	CSS	(69559)	3.0 km	MPC · JPL
724167	2007 UG_{90}	—	October 30, 2007	Mount Lemmon	Mount Lemmon Survey	·	710 m	MPC · JPL
724168	2007 UK_{91}	—	September 10, 2007	Mount Lemmon	Mount Lemmon Survey	VER	2.5 km	MPC · JPL
724169	2007 UM_{97}	—	October 30, 2007	Mount Lemmon	Mount Lemmon Survey	·	1.2 km	MPC · JPL
724170	2007 UB_{109}	—	May 23, 2001	Cerro Tololo	Deep Ecliptic Survey	THM	1.7 km	MPC · JPL
724171	2007 UM_{109}	—	October 8, 2007	Kitt Peak	Spacewatch	·	1.4 km	MPC · JPL
724172	2007 UF_{112}	—	October 18, 2007	Kitt Peak	Spacewatch	·	1.9 km	MPC · JPL
724173	2007 UG_{114}	—	October 31, 2007	Kitt Peak	Spacewatch	·	1.8 km	MPC · JPL
724174	2007 UX_{122}	—	October 4, 2007	Kitt Peak	Spacewatch	·	1.1 km	MPC · JPL
724175	2007 UB_{124}	—	October 31, 2007	Mount Lemmon	Mount Lemmon Survey	·	1.1 km	MPC · JPL
724176	2007 UW_{125}	—	October 14, 2007	Catalina	CSS	T_{j} (2.99) · (895)	5.5 km	MPC · JPL
724177	2007 UV_{130}	—	October 20, 2007	Mount Lemmon	Mount Lemmon Survey	·	1.6 km	MPC · JPL
724178	2007 UB_{132}	—	October 6, 2007	Kitt Peak	Spacewatch	·	1.2 km	MPC · JPL
724179	2007 UC_{143}	—	October 16, 2007	Mount Lemmon	Mount Lemmon Survey	·	2.3 km	MPC · JPL
724180	2007 UE_{143}	—	October 20, 2007	Mount Lemmon	Mount Lemmon Survey	·	1.3 km	MPC · JPL
724181	2007 UJ_{144}	—	October 18, 2007	Mount Lemmon	Mount Lemmon Survey	·	1.6 km	MPC · JPL
724182	2007 UP_{146}	—	June 10, 2010	WISE	WISE	EOS	1.7 km	MPC · JPL
724183	2007 UB_{148}	—	October 6, 2007	Kitt Peak	Spacewatch	·	1.5 km	MPC · JPL
724184	2007 UP_{148}	—	December 29, 2014	Mount Lemmon	Mount Lemmon Survey	·	2.4 km	MPC · JPL
724185	2007 UX_{148}	—	May 10, 2014	Haleakala	Pan-STARRS 1	MAR	690 m	MPC · JPL
724186	2007 UZ_{148}	—	October 18, 2007	Mount Lemmon	Mount Lemmon Survey	KON	1.8 km	MPC · JPL
724187	2007 UC_{149}	—	February 4, 2009	Mount Lemmon	Mount Lemmon Survey	LIX	3.0 km	MPC · JPL
724188	2007 UW_{149}	—	January 4, 2016	Haleakala	Pan-STARRS 1	·	2.9 km	MPC · JPL
724189	2007 UF_{152}	—	July 26, 2011	Haleakala	Pan-STARRS 1	NEM	1.8 km	MPC · JPL
724190	2007 UJ_{152}	—	June 23, 2017	Haleakala	Pan-STARRS 1	·	2.5 km	MPC · JPL
724191	2007 UW_{152}	—	October 16, 2007	Mount Lemmon	Mount Lemmon Survey	·	1.2 km	MPC · JPL
724192	2007 UO_{154}	—	November 24, 2013	Haleakala	Pan-STARRS 1	·	2.4 km	MPC · JPL
724193	2007 UX_{154}	—	October 20, 2007	Mount Lemmon	Mount Lemmon Survey	·	2.2 km	MPC · JPL
724194	2007 UL_{155}	—	October 21, 2007	Mount Lemmon	Mount Lemmon Survey	·	2.6 km	MPC · JPL
724195	2007 UN_{155}	—	October 16, 2007	Mount Lemmon	Mount Lemmon Survey	·	1.5 km	MPC · JPL
724196	2007 UO_{155}	—	October 30, 2007	Mount Lemmon	Mount Lemmon Survey	·	650 m	MPC · JPL
724197	2007 UU_{155}	—	October 18, 2007	Mount Lemmon	Mount Lemmon Survey	·	2.4 km	MPC · JPL
724198	2007 UW_{155}	—	October 30, 2007	Mount Lemmon	Mount Lemmon Survey	·	1.9 km	MPC · JPL
724199	2007 UA_{159}	—	October 20, 2007	Mount Lemmon	Mount Lemmon Survey	·	1.4 km	MPC · JPL
724200	2007 UF_{159}	—	October 18, 2007	Mount Lemmon	Mount Lemmon Survey	·	1.2 km	MPC · JPL

== 724201–724300 ==
back to top

Designation			Discovery			Properties		Ref
Permanent	Provisional	Named after	Date	Site	Discoverer(s)	Category	Diam.	Ref
724201	2007 UG_{160}	—	October 16, 2007	Mount Lemmon	Mount Lemmon Survey	·	1.1 km	MPC · JPL
724202	2007 UB_{162}	—	October 20, 2007	Mount Lemmon	Mount Lemmon Survey	HYG	2.5 km	MPC · JPL
724203	2007 VM	—	November 1, 2007	Mount Lemmon	Mount Lemmon Survey	·	1.2 km	MPC · JPL
724204	2007 VV_{18}	—	October 8, 2007	Mount Lemmon	Mount Lemmon Survey	·	2.2 km	MPC · JPL
724205	2007 VA_{21}	—	September 10, 2007	Kitt Peak	Spacewatch	·	2.4 km	MPC · JPL
724206	2007 VS_{21}	—	October 8, 2007	Kitt Peak	Spacewatch	·	1.3 km	MPC · JPL
724207	2007 VZ_{21}	—	October 5, 2007	Kitt Peak	Spacewatch	·	1.6 km	MPC · JPL
724208	2007 VP_{25}	—	October 10, 2007	Mount Lemmon	Mount Lemmon Survey	PAD	1.4 km	MPC · JPL
724209	2007 VC_{26}	—	November 2, 2007	Mount Lemmon	Mount Lemmon Survey	URS	2.3 km	MPC · JPL
724210	2007 VA_{28}	—	October 8, 2007	Mount Lemmon	Mount Lemmon Survey	·	3.2 km	MPC · JPL
724211	2007 VM_{28}	—	October 11, 2007	Kitt Peak	Spacewatch	·	1.2 km	MPC · JPL
724212	2007 VY_{28}	—	October 10, 2002	Apache Point	SDSS Collaboration	·	1.7 km	MPC · JPL
724213	2007 VE_{34}	—	October 11, 2007	Kitt Peak	Spacewatch	·	1.2 km	MPC · JPL
724214	2007 VB_{36}	—	November 2, 2007	Mount Lemmon	Mount Lemmon Survey	·	1.2 km	MPC · JPL
724215	2007 VC_{36}	—	November 2, 2007	Mount Lemmon	Mount Lemmon Survey	·	2.5 km	MPC · JPL
724216	2007 VN_{36}	—	January 4, 2003	Kitt Peak	Deep Lens Survey	·	3.0 km	MPC · JPL
724217	2007 VW_{36}	—	October 18, 2007	Kitt Peak	Spacewatch	·	1.1 km	MPC · JPL
724218	2007 VZ_{36}	—	November 2, 2007	Catalina	CSS	·	1.5 km	MPC · JPL
724219	2007 VQ_{39}	—	November 3, 2007	Kitt Peak	Spacewatch	VER	2.2 km	MPC · JPL
724220	2007 VT_{42}	—	November 3, 2007	Mount Lemmon	Mount Lemmon Survey	·	720 m	MPC · JPL
724221	2007 VF_{54}	—	October 20, 2007	Mount Lemmon	Mount Lemmon Survey	·	1.2 km	MPC · JPL
724222	2007 VZ_{59}	—	October 19, 2003	Kitt Peak	Spacewatch	·	910 m	MPC · JPL
724223	2007 VW_{60}	—	October 21, 2007	Mount Lemmon	Mount Lemmon Survey	HNS	890 m	MPC · JPL
724224	2007 VF_{65}	—	November 1, 2007	Kitt Peak	Spacewatch	·	1.7 km	MPC · JPL
724225	2007 VS_{66}	—	October 21, 2007	Mount Lemmon	Mount Lemmon Survey	·	2.5 km	MPC · JPL
724226	2007 VM_{67}	—	October 9, 2007	Mount Lemmon	Mount Lemmon Survey	·	990 m	MPC · JPL
724227	2007 VK_{68}	—	November 3, 2007	Mount Lemmon	Mount Lemmon Survey	THM	1.7 km	MPC · JPL
724228	2007 VL_{70}	—	September 5, 2000	Apache Point	SDSS Collaboration	·	4.0 km	MPC · JPL
724229	2007 VB_{72}	—	October 23, 2003	Kitt Peak	Spacewatch	(5)	740 m	MPC · JPL
724230	2007 VD_{74}	—	October 8, 2007	Mount Lemmon	Mount Lemmon Survey	·	1.8 km	MPC · JPL
724231	2007 VK_{74}	—	September 25, 1998	Apache Point	SDSS	·	1.2 km	MPC · JPL
724232	2007 VA_{78}	—	November 3, 2007	Kitt Peak	Spacewatch	·	2.3 km	MPC · JPL
724233	2007 VK_{82}	—	October 10, 2007	Kitt Peak	Spacewatch	·	1.3 km	MPC · JPL
724234	2007 VX_{89}	—	October 12, 2007	Kitt Peak	Spacewatch	HNS	1.1 km	MPC · JPL
724235	2007 VC_{96}	—	November 7, 2007	Mount Lemmon	Mount Lemmon Survey	·	1.4 km	MPC · JPL
724236	2007 VC_{100}	—	November 2, 2007	Kitt Peak	Spacewatch	NYS	840 m	MPC · JPL
724237	2007 VR_{101}	—	November 2, 2007	Kitt Peak	Spacewatch	·	3.0 km	MPC · JPL
724238	2007 VZ_{102}	—	November 3, 2007	Kitt Peak	Spacewatch	·	1.2 km	MPC · JPL
724239	2007 VP_{107}	—	November 3, 2007	Kitt Peak	Spacewatch	·	2.2 km	MPC · JPL
724240	2007 VD_{111}	—	November 3, 2007	Kitt Peak	Spacewatch	·	2.9 km	MPC · JPL
724241	2007 VZ_{118}	—	September 15, 2007	Mount Lemmon	Mount Lemmon Survey	EUN	1.0 km	MPC · JPL
724242	2007 VO_{119}	—	September 12, 2007	Mount Lemmon	Mount Lemmon Survey	VER	2.4 km	MPC · JPL
724243	2007 VZ_{121}	—	November 5, 2007	Kitt Peak	Spacewatch	·	600 m	MPC · JPL
724244	2007 VM_{123}	—	November 5, 2007	Mount Lemmon	Mount Lemmon Survey	·	3.4 km	MPC · JPL
724245	2007 VN_{123}	—	November 5, 2007	Mount Lemmon	Mount Lemmon Survey	LUT	3.6 km	MPC · JPL
724246	2007 VG_{127}	—	October 8, 2007	Mount Lemmon	Mount Lemmon Survey	·	1.0 km	MPC · JPL
724247	2007 VX_{131}	—	November 2, 2007	Mount Lemmon	Mount Lemmon Survey	·	830 m	MPC · JPL
724248	2007 VT_{134}	—	November 3, 2007	Mount Lemmon	Mount Lemmon Survey	·	2.7 km	MPC · JPL
724249	2007 VC_{135}	—	October 7, 2007	Mount Lemmon	Mount Lemmon Survey	EOS	1.6 km	MPC · JPL
724250	2007 VO_{137}	—	November 5, 2007	Kitt Peak	Spacewatch	HOF	2.8 km	MPC · JPL
724251	2007 VQ_{137}	—	September 18, 2003	Kitt Peak	Spacewatch	·	890 m	MPC · JPL
724252	2007 VO_{139}	—	October 10, 2007	Kitt Peak	Spacewatch	·	1.5 km	MPC · JPL
724253	2007 VX_{140}	—	November 4, 2007	Mount Lemmon	Mount Lemmon Survey	·	690 m	MPC · JPL
724254	2007 VZ_{141}	—	October 20, 2007	Mount Lemmon	Mount Lemmon Survey	·	2.6 km	MPC · JPL
724255	2007 VW_{145}	—	November 4, 2007	Kitt Peak	Spacewatch	PHO	870 m	MPC · JPL
724256	2007 VX_{149}	—	October 11, 2007	Kitt Peak	Spacewatch	·	1.3 km	MPC · JPL
724257	2007 VZ_{149}	—	May 6, 2006	Mount Lemmon	Mount Lemmon Survey	·	1.0 km	MPC · JPL
724258	2007 VC_{150}	—	November 7, 2007	Mount Lemmon	Mount Lemmon Survey	URS	2.5 km	MPC · JPL
724259	2007 VY_{150}	—	November 7, 2007	Kitt Peak	Spacewatch	EUN	1.0 km	MPC · JPL
724260	2007 VL_{154}	—	November 5, 2007	Kitt Peak	Spacewatch	·	1.4 km	MPC · JPL
724261	2007 VV_{159}	—	November 5, 2007	Kitt Peak	Spacewatch	·	1.2 km	MPC · JPL
724262	2007 VK_{167}	—	November 9, 2007	Kitt Peak	Spacewatch	·	570 m	MPC · JPL
724263	2007 VE_{171}	—	November 7, 2007	Kitt Peak	Spacewatch	·	1.1 km	MPC · JPL
724264	2007 VL_{171}	—	November 7, 2007	Kitt Peak	Spacewatch	·	730 m	MPC · JPL
724265	2007 VE_{172}	—	October 21, 2007	Mount Lemmon	Mount Lemmon Survey	·	1.6 km	MPC · JPL
724266	2007 VK_{174}	—	October 16, 2007	Catalina	CSS	·	4.0 km	MPC · JPL
724267	2007 VM_{174}	—	November 3, 2007	Mount Lemmon	Mount Lemmon Survey	V	510 m	MPC · JPL
724268	2007 VW_{175}	—	October 16, 2007	Kitt Peak	Spacewatch	·	1.2 km	MPC · JPL
724269	2007 VM_{177}	—	November 5, 2007	Mount Lemmon	Mount Lemmon Survey	·	1.0 km	MPC · JPL
724270	2007 VY_{195}	—	October 8, 2007	Kitt Peak	Spacewatch	·	1.8 km	MPC · JPL
724271	2007 VG_{196}	—	November 7, 2007	Mount Lemmon	Mount Lemmon Survey	·	1.9 km	MPC · JPL
724272	2007 VX_{198}	—	November 9, 2007	Mount Lemmon	Mount Lemmon Survey	·	620 m	MPC · JPL
724273	2007 VM_{203}	—	November 8, 2007	Mount Lemmon	Mount Lemmon Survey	·	1.1 km	MPC · JPL
724274	2007 VQ_{205}	—	October 7, 2007	Mount Lemmon	Mount Lemmon Survey	·	1.1 km	MPC · JPL
724275	2007 VQ_{210}	—	November 9, 2007	Kitt Peak	Spacewatch	·	1.5 km	MPC · JPL
724276	2007 VV_{213}	—	November 9, 2007	Kitt Peak	Spacewatch	·	1.4 km	MPC · JPL
724277	2007 VE_{218}	—	November 9, 2007	Kitt Peak	Spacewatch	·	1.4 km	MPC · JPL
724278	2007 VS_{222}	—	November 7, 2007	Mount Lemmon	Mount Lemmon Survey	·	2.1 km	MPC · JPL
724279	2007 VK_{223}	—	September 22, 2014	Haleakala	Pan-STARRS 1	·	660 m	MPC · JPL
724280	2007 VL_{230}	—	October 24, 2001	Palomar	NEAT	·	3.0 km	MPC · JPL
724281	2007 VR_{236}	—	April 14, 2005	Catalina	CSS	·	2.0 km	MPC · JPL
724282	2007 VJ_{237}	—	October 30, 2007	Mount Lemmon	Mount Lemmon Survey	(29841)	1.2 km	MPC · JPL
724283	2007 VO_{240}	—	November 7, 2007	Catalina	CSS	·	2.0 km	MPC · JPL
724284	2007 VL_{242}	—	November 12, 2007	Mount Lemmon	Mount Lemmon Survey	·	3.1 km	MPC · JPL
724285	2007 VT_{248}	—	November 14, 2007	Mount Lemmon	Mount Lemmon Survey	·	3.6 km	MPC · JPL
724286	2007 VO_{254}	—	August 23, 2001	Kitt Peak	Spacewatch	·	1.8 km	MPC · JPL
724287	2007 VY_{258}	—	November 15, 2007	Mount Lemmon	Mount Lemmon Survey	·	4.0 km	MPC · JPL
724288	2007 VO_{260}	—	November 15, 2007	Mount Lemmon	Mount Lemmon Survey	·	2.4 km	MPC · JPL
724289	2007 VN_{266}	—	September 20, 2003	Kitt Peak	Spacewatch	·	910 m	MPC · JPL
724290	2007 VP_{266}	—	November 14, 2007	Kitt Peak	Spacewatch	ELF	3.4 km	MPC · JPL
724291	2007 VS_{275}	—	November 13, 2007	Kitt Peak	Spacewatch	V	460 m	MPC · JPL
724292	2007 VJ_{276}	—	October 11, 2007	Kitt Peak	Spacewatch	·	2.0 km	MPC · JPL
724293	2007 VO_{283}	—	November 14, 2007	Kitt Peak	Spacewatch	·	560 m	MPC · JPL
724294	2007 VX_{287}	—	November 2, 2007	Kitt Peak	Spacewatch	·	690 m	MPC · JPL
724295	2007 VV_{295}	—	November 14, 2007	Mount Lemmon	Mount Lemmon Survey	·	1.7 km	MPC · JPL
724296	2007 VC_{302}	—	November 4, 2007	Siding Spring	SSS	T_{j} (2.96)	3.1 km	MPC · JPL
724297	2007 VN_{309}	—	November 15, 2007	Catalina	CSS	·	3.2 km	MPC · JPL
724298	2007 VA_{317}	—	November 14, 2007	Kitt Peak	Spacewatch	·	1.4 km	MPC · JPL
724299	2007 VP_{321}	—	March 7, 2003	Apache Point	SDSS Collaboration	·	3.1 km	MPC · JPL
724300	2007 VR_{322}	—	November 2, 2007	Kitt Peak	Spacewatch	·	1.2 km	MPC · JPL

== 724301–724400 ==
back to top

Designation			Discovery			Properties		Ref
Permanent	Provisional	Named after	Date	Site	Discoverer(s)	Category	Diam.	Ref
724301	2007 VA_{339}	—	November 6, 2007	Kitt Peak	Spacewatch	·	1.4 km	MPC · JPL
724302	2007 VG_{341}	—	November 8, 2007	Mount Lemmon	Mount Lemmon Survey	·	1.9 km	MPC · JPL
724303	2007 VB_{342}	—	November 14, 2007	Mount Lemmon	Mount Lemmon Survey	·	1.5 km	MPC · JPL
724304	2007 VK_{343}	—	November 12, 2007	Mount Lemmon	Mount Lemmon Survey	·	1.2 km	MPC · JPL
724305	2007 VL_{343}	—	July 4, 2010	WISE	WISE	·	3.0 km	MPC · JPL
724306	2007 VR_{345}	—	May 6, 2014	Haleakala	Pan-STARRS 1	·	1.2 km	MPC · JPL
724307	2007 VZ_{345}	—	March 4, 2016	Haleakala	Pan-STARRS 1	·	540 m	MPC · JPL
724308	2007 VH_{346}	—	February 16, 2010	WISE	WISE	·	1.4 km	MPC · JPL
724309	2007 VN_{346}	—	December 10, 2013	Mount Lemmon	Mount Lemmon Survey	·	2.2 km	MPC · JPL
724310	2007 VK_{347}	—	January 28, 2015	Haleakala	Pan-STARRS 1	EOS	1.5 km	MPC · JPL
724311	2007 VR_{348}	—	February 25, 2010	WISE	WISE	T_{j} (2.96)	3.4 km	MPC · JPL
724312	2007 VM_{349}	—	April 18, 2010	WISE	WISE	RAF	940 m	MPC · JPL
724313	2007 VO_{349}	—	August 13, 2012	Kitt Peak	Spacewatch	·	2.4 km	MPC · JPL
724314	2007 VR_{349}	—	December 29, 2014	Haleakala	Pan-STARRS 1	·	2.8 km	MPC · JPL
724315	2007 VW_{349}	—	February 14, 2010	WISE	WISE	·	1.1 km	MPC · JPL
724316	2007 VJ_{350}	—	November 3, 2007	Kitt Peak	Spacewatch	·	2.5 km	MPC · JPL
724317	2007 VR_{350}	—	November 5, 2007	Mount Lemmon	Mount Lemmon Survey	·	2.2 km	MPC · JPL
724318	2007 VW_{350}	—	June 23, 2010	WISE	WISE	LIX	3.4 km	MPC · JPL
724319	2007 VZ_{350}	—	September 29, 2011	Mount Lemmon	Mount Lemmon Survey	·	810 m	MPC · JPL
724320	2007 VS_{351}	—	April 4, 2010	Kitt Peak	Spacewatch	·	2.7 km	MPC · JPL
724321	2007 VF_{352}	—	February 25, 2015	Haleakala	Pan-STARRS 1	·	2.4 km	MPC · JPL
724322	2007 VQ_{355}	—	July 13, 2013	Haleakala	Pan-STARRS 1	·	470 m	MPC · JPL
724323	2007 VY_{355}	—	November 14, 2007	Kitt Peak	Spacewatch	·	820 m	MPC · JPL
724324	2007 VL_{356}	—	October 20, 2016	Mount Lemmon	Mount Lemmon Survey	·	1.5 km	MPC · JPL
724325	2007 VT_{357}	—	May 7, 2010	Mount Lemmon	Mount Lemmon Survey	·	2.5 km	MPC · JPL
724326	2007 VY_{358}	—	June 30, 2010	WISE	WISE	·	3.3 km	MPC · JPL
724327	2007 VO_{359}	—	November 1, 2007	Kitt Peak	Spacewatch	·	1.2 km	MPC · JPL
724328	2007 VU_{359}	—	September 24, 2011	Haleakala	Pan-STARRS 1	MAR	800 m	MPC · JPL
724329	2007 VC_{361}	—	October 20, 2007	Mount Lemmon	Mount Lemmon Survey	·	2.5 km	MPC · JPL
724330	2007 VG_{361}	—	June 8, 2016	Haleakala	Pan-STARRS 1	·	1.5 km	MPC · JPL
724331	2007 VH_{363}	—	November 2, 2007	Kitt Peak	Spacewatch	VER	2.1 km	MPC · JPL
724332	2007 VB_{364}	—	November 2, 2007	Kitt Peak	Spacewatch	EOS	1.4 km	MPC · JPL
724333	2007 VC_{364}	—	November 4, 2007	Mount Lemmon	Mount Lemmon Survey	·	2.5 km	MPC · JPL
724334	2007 VZ_{366}	—	November 2, 2007	Kitt Peak	Spacewatch	·	2.4 km	MPC · JPL
724335	2007 VB_{367}	—	November 7, 2007	Kitt Peak	Spacewatch	ADE	1.6 km	MPC · JPL
724336	2007 VL_{367}	—	November 13, 2007	Kitt Peak	Spacewatch	·	1.7 km	MPC · JPL
724337	2007 VU_{368}	—	November 9, 2007	Kitt Peak	Spacewatch	EUN	1.1 km	MPC · JPL
724338	2007 VT_{370}	—	November 12, 2007	Mount Lemmon	Mount Lemmon Survey	WIT	670 m	MPC · JPL
724339	2007 VL_{372}	—	November 3, 2007	Mount Lemmon	Mount Lemmon Survey	EUN	1.1 km	MPC · JPL
724340	2007 VY_{373}	—	November 12, 2007	Mount Lemmon	Mount Lemmon Survey	·	2.6 km	MPC · JPL
724341	2007 VH_{377}	—	November 9, 2007	Kitt Peak	Spacewatch	KOR	1.1 km	MPC · JPL
724342	2007 VQ_{378}	—	November 5, 2007	Kitt Peak	Spacewatch	·	1.5 km	MPC · JPL
724343	2007 VK_{380}	—	November 12, 2007	Mount Lemmon	Mount Lemmon Survey	·	1.3 km	MPC · JPL
724344	2007 WK_{9}	—	November 16, 2007	Mount Lemmon	Mount Lemmon Survey	·	1.3 km	MPC · JPL
724345	2007 WN_{9}	—	October 11, 2002	Apache Point	SDSS	·	2.1 km	MPC · JPL
724346	2007 WM_{10}	—	November 17, 2007	Mount Lemmon	Mount Lemmon Survey	·	3.0 km	MPC · JPL
724347	2007 WK_{13}	—	November 18, 2007	Mount Lemmon	Mount Lemmon Survey	·	1.5 km	MPC · JPL
724348	2007 WJ_{14}	—	November 3, 2007	Kitt Peak	Spacewatch	·	2.8 km	MPC · JPL
724349	2007 WM_{16}	—	November 7, 2007	Kitt Peak	Spacewatch	ADE	2.2 km	MPC · JPL
724350	2007 WS_{16}	—	November 4, 2007	Kitt Peak	Spacewatch	·	2.5 km	MPC · JPL
724351	2007 WY_{28}	—	November 19, 2007	Kitt Peak	Spacewatch	·	1.9 km	MPC · JPL
724352	2007 WD_{33}	—	January 27, 2004	Kitt Peak	Spacewatch	·	1.1 km	MPC · JPL
724353	2007 WH_{35}	—	December 19, 2003	Kitt Peak	Spacewatch	·	1.3 km	MPC · JPL
724354	2007 WG_{38}	—	November 19, 2007	Mount Lemmon	Mount Lemmon Survey	·	2.7 km	MPC · JPL
724355	2007 WG_{42}	—	November 8, 2007	Kitt Peak	Spacewatch	·	2.4 km	MPC · JPL
724356	2007 WE_{48}	—	November 20, 2007	Mount Lemmon	Mount Lemmon Survey	NEM	1.5 km	MPC · JPL
724357	2007 WK_{52}	—	November 20, 2007	Mount Lemmon	Mount Lemmon Survey	MRX	790 m	MPC · JPL
724358	2007 WO_{53}	—	October 14, 2007	Mount Lemmon	Mount Lemmon Survey	·	2.6 km	MPC · JPL
724359	2007 WU_{54}	—	November 20, 2007	Mount Lemmon	Mount Lemmon Survey	·	1.1 km	MPC · JPL
724360	2007 WG_{65}	—	November 19, 2007	Mount Lemmon	Mount Lemmon Survey	·	790 m	MPC · JPL
724361	2007 WQ_{65}	—	January 14, 2010	WISE	WISE	·	3.7 km	MPC · JPL
724362	2007 WT_{65}	—	April 22, 2009	Mount Lemmon	Mount Lemmon Survey	·	1.4 km	MPC · JPL
724363	2007 WU_{65}	—	November 22, 2014	Haleakala	Pan-STARRS 1	·	670 m	MPC · JPL
724364	2007 WB_{67}	—	November 18, 2007	Mount Lemmon	Mount Lemmon Survey	URS	3.2 km	MPC · JPL
724365	2007 WG_{67}	—	April 4, 2014	Haleakala	Pan-STARRS 1	·	1.8 km	MPC · JPL
724366	2007 WL_{67}	—	February 16, 2012	Haleakala	Pan-STARRS 1	·	530 m	MPC · JPL
724367	2007 WU_{67}	—	January 16, 2015	Haleakala	Pan-STARRS 1	·	590 m	MPC · JPL
724368	2007 WG_{68}	—	October 6, 2016	Haleakala	Pan-STARRS 1	·	1.4 km	MPC · JPL
724369	2007 WL_{69}	—	March 30, 2016	Haleakala	Pan-STARRS 1	·	550 m	MPC · JPL
724370	2007 WN_{69}	—	April 15, 2010	Mount Lemmon	Mount Lemmon Survey	VER	2.6 km	MPC · JPL
724371	2007 WH_{70}	—	November 20, 2007	Mount Lemmon	Mount Lemmon Survey	V	570 m	MPC · JPL
724372	2007 WZ_{74}	—	November 19, 2007	Kitt Peak	Spacewatch	·	1.4 km	MPC · JPL
724373	2007 XG_{9}	—	September 27, 2006	Catalina	CSS	·	3.1 km	MPC · JPL
724374	2007 XM_{12}	—	December 4, 2007	Kitt Peak	Spacewatch	TEL	1.4 km	MPC · JPL
724375	2007 XH_{13}	—	December 4, 2007	Catalina	CSS	·	4.6 km	MPC · JPL
724376	2007 XO_{25}	—	December 13, 2007	Lulin	LUSS	·	1.1 km	MPC · JPL
724377	2007 XN_{29}	—	October 30, 2007	Mount Lemmon	Mount Lemmon Survey	·	1.2 km	MPC · JPL
724378	2007 XM_{31}	—	December 15, 2007	Kitt Peak	Spacewatch	·	1.5 km	MPC · JPL
724379	2007 XJ_{33}	—	December 15, 2007	Lulin	LUSS	EOS	1.1 km	MPC · JPL
724380	2007 XF_{46}	—	December 15, 2007	Catalina	CSS	·	3.6 km	MPC · JPL
724381	2007 XY_{46}	—	December 3, 2007	Kitt Peak	Spacewatch	·	550 m	MPC · JPL
724382	2007 XQ_{52}	—	December 15, 2007	Kitt Peak	Spacewatch	·	1.4 km	MPC · JPL
724383	2007 XA_{62}	—	December 5, 2007	Kitt Peak	Spacewatch	MRX	840 m	MPC · JPL
724384	2007 XG_{62}	—	October 17, 2010	Mount Lemmon	Mount Lemmon Survey	·	960 m	MPC · JPL
724385	2007 XJ_{62}	—	December 28, 2014	Mount Lemmon	Mount Lemmon Survey	V	640 m	MPC · JPL
724386	2007 XT_{64}	—	December 4, 2007	Kitt Peak	Spacewatch	·	3.4 km	MPC · JPL
724387	2007 XU_{64}	—	February 7, 2010	WISE	WISE	L4	10 km	MPC · JPL
724388	2007 XJ_{65}	—	May 4, 2014	Haleakala	Pan-STARRS 1	·	1.2 km	MPC · JPL
724389	2007 XQ_{65}	—	April 22, 2015	Mount Lemmon	Mount Lemmon Survey	T_{j} (2.95)	3.8 km	MPC · JPL
724390	2007 XN_{66}	—	April 27, 2017	Haleakala	Pan-STARRS 1	·	3.1 km	MPC · JPL
724391	2007 XC_{68}	—	December 9, 2015	Haleakala	Pan-STARRS 1	·	850 m	MPC · JPL
724392	2007 XQ_{68}	—	October 7, 2012	Haleakala	Pan-STARRS 1	HYG	2.3 km	MPC · JPL
724393	2007 XE_{69}	—	December 15, 2007	Kitt Peak	Spacewatch	·	1.5 km	MPC · JPL
724394	2007 XX_{69}	—	December 4, 2007	Mount Lemmon	Mount Lemmon Survey	·	1.1 km	MPC · JPL
724395	2007 XY_{69}	—	December 5, 2007	Kitt Peak	Spacewatch	PAD	1.4 km	MPC · JPL
724396	2007 YG_{3}	—	September 15, 2006	Kitt Peak	Spacewatch	·	1.8 km	MPC · JPL
724397	2007 YN_{8}	—	December 16, 2007	Mount Lemmon	Mount Lemmon Survey	·	2.7 km	MPC · JPL
724398	2007 YG_{9}	—	December 16, 2007	Mount Lemmon	Mount Lemmon Survey	H	480 m	MPC · JPL
724399	2007 YJ_{9}	—	December 16, 2007	Mount Lemmon	Mount Lemmon Survey	·	2.6 km	MPC · JPL
724400	2007 YQ_{11}	—	May 26, 2000	Anderson Mesa	LONEOS	·	2.9 km	MPC · JPL

== 724401–724500 ==
back to top

Designation			Discovery			Properties		Ref
Permanent	Provisional	Named after	Date	Site	Discoverer(s)	Category	Diam.	Ref
724401	2007 YM_{14}	—	December 17, 2007	Mount Lemmon	Mount Lemmon Survey	·	1.7 km	MPC · JPL
724402	2007 YH_{17}	—	September 19, 2003	Kitt Peak	Spacewatch	(1338) (FLO)	520 m	MPC · JPL
724403	2007 YN_{25}	—	December 18, 2007	Mount Lemmon	Mount Lemmon Survey	·	730 m	MPC · JPL
724404	2007 YM_{27}	—	December 18, 2007	Kitt Peak	Spacewatch	PHO	910 m	MPC · JPL
724405	2007 YN_{38}	—	December 30, 2007	Mount Lemmon	Mount Lemmon Survey	·	950 m	MPC · JPL
724406	2007 YC_{39}	—	December 30, 2007	Mount Lemmon	Mount Lemmon Survey	·	3.1 km	MPC · JPL
724407	2007 YE_{39}	—	October 16, 2001	Kitt Peak	Spacewatch	·	1.6 km	MPC · JPL
724408	2007 YZ_{41}	—	December 30, 2007	Kitt Peak	Spacewatch	·	3.5 km	MPC · JPL
724409	2007 YY_{46}	—	December 15, 2007	Mount Lemmon	Mount Lemmon Survey	·	1.6 km	MPC · JPL
724410	2007 YE_{53}	—	December 30, 2007	Kitt Peak	Spacewatch	·	870 m	MPC · JPL
724411	2007 YF_{76}	—	December 16, 2007	Mount Lemmon	Mount Lemmon Survey	·	1.9 km	MPC · JPL
724412	2007 YL_{76}	—	December 17, 2007	Mount Lemmon	Mount Lemmon Survey	·	1.5 km	MPC · JPL
724413	2007 YE_{77}	—	December 20, 2007	Mount Lemmon	Mount Lemmon Survey	·	1.1 km	MPC · JPL
724414	2007 YX_{78}	—	December 16, 2007	Kitt Peak	Spacewatch	HOF	2.1 km	MPC · JPL
724415	2007 YE_{79}	—	December 17, 2007	Kitt Peak	Spacewatch	·	680 m	MPC · JPL
724416	2007 YO_{79}	—	January 26, 2015	Haleakala	Pan-STARRS 1	·	3.1 km	MPC · JPL
724417	2007 YH_{80}	—	October 24, 2011	Kitt Peak	Spacewatch	·	1.6 km	MPC · JPL
724418	2007 YY_{80}	—	October 23, 2011	Haleakala	Pan-STARRS 1	·	1.3 km	MPC · JPL
724419	2007 YZ_{80}	—	February 6, 2010	WISE	WISE	·	3.6 km	MPC · JPL
724420	2007 YA_{82}	—	May 25, 2015	Haleakala	Pan-STARRS 1	·	2.2 km	MPC · JPL
724421	2007 YF_{82}	—	December 30, 2007	Kitt Peak	Spacewatch	·	3.9 km	MPC · JPL
724422	2007 YK_{82}	—	October 17, 2010	Mount Lemmon	Mount Lemmon Survey	·	880 m	MPC · JPL
724423	2007 YC_{84}	—	October 7, 2012	Haleakala	Pan-STARRS 1	·	2.5 km	MPC · JPL
724424	2007 YN_{85}	—	September 23, 2015	Haleakala	Pan-STARRS 1	·	1.8 km	MPC · JPL
724425	2007 YZ_{85}	—	November 17, 2007	Mount Lemmon	Mount Lemmon Survey	·	610 m	MPC · JPL
724426	2007 YP_{86}	—	October 25, 2016	Haleakala	Pan-STARRS 1	·	1.5 km	MPC · JPL
724427 Sorinhotea	2007 YY_{86}	Sorinhotea	November 6, 2018	Roque de los Muchachos	EURONEAR	LIX	3.0 km	MPC · JPL
724428	2007 YC_{87}	—	December 20, 2007	Mount Lemmon	Mount Lemmon Survey	·	2.6 km	MPC · JPL
724429	2007 YD_{89}	—	December 8, 2016	Mount Lemmon	Mount Lemmon Survey	·	2.3 km	MPC · JPL
724430	2007 YO_{89}	—	September 22, 2011	Kitt Peak	Spacewatch	·	1.2 km	MPC · JPL
724431	2007 YQ_{89}	—	January 26, 2017	Haleakala	Pan-STARRS 1	·	1.3 km	MPC · JPL
724432	2007 YV_{89}	—	April 18, 2015	Cerro Tololo-DECam	DECam	·	2.3 km	MPC · JPL
724433	2007 YL_{90}	—	December 31, 2007	Kitt Peak	Spacewatch	·	1.5 km	MPC · JPL
724434	2007 YS_{90}	—	December 16, 2007	Mount Lemmon	Mount Lemmon Survey	·	2.2 km	MPC · JPL
724435	2007 YY_{90}	—	December 30, 2007	Kitt Peak	Spacewatch	·	2.5 km	MPC · JPL
724436	2007 YC_{93}	—	December 16, 2007	Kitt Peak	Spacewatch	·	1.6 km	MPC · JPL
724437	2007 YE_{94}	—	December 30, 2007	Mount Lemmon	Mount Lemmon Survey	·	1.3 km	MPC · JPL
724438	2007 YM_{94}	—	December 20, 2007	Kitt Peak	Spacewatch	·	1.3 km	MPC · JPL
724439	2007 YN_{94}	—	December 30, 2007	Kitt Peak	Spacewatch	·	1.7 km	MPC · JPL
724440	2007 YY_{94}	—	December 31, 2007	Kitt Peak	Spacewatch	·	1.4 km	MPC · JPL
724441	2007 YE_{95}	—	December 17, 2007	Kitt Peak	Spacewatch	·	2.2 km	MPC · JPL
724442	2008 AV_{7}	—	December 31, 2007	Mount Lemmon	Mount Lemmon Survey	·	1.7 km	MPC · JPL
724443	2008 AC_{12}	—	January 10, 2008	Mount Lemmon	Mount Lemmon Survey	·	590 m	MPC · JPL
724444	2008 AE_{14}	—	January 10, 2008	Mount Lemmon	Mount Lemmon Survey	·	2.0 km	MPC · JPL
724445	2008 AQ_{19}	—	January 10, 2008	Mount Lemmon	Mount Lemmon Survey	·	2.4 km	MPC · JPL
724446	2008 AX_{20}	—	January 10, 2008	Mount Lemmon	Mount Lemmon Survey	·	1.7 km	MPC · JPL
724447	2008 AR_{29}	—	May 30, 2010	WISE	WISE	·	1.2 km	MPC · JPL
724448	2008 AA_{48}	—	January 11, 2008	Kitt Peak	Spacewatch	AGN	890 m	MPC · JPL
724449	2008 AE_{54}	—	November 11, 2007	Mount Lemmon	Mount Lemmon Survey	NYS	870 m	MPC · JPL
724450	2008 AN_{56}	—	January 11, 2008	Kitt Peak	Spacewatch	·	1.1 km	MPC · JPL
724451	2008 AE_{58}	—	January 11, 2008	Kitt Peak	Spacewatch	·	1.4 km	MPC · JPL
724452	2008 AX_{68}	—	December 14, 2007	Mount Lemmon	Mount Lemmon Survey	·	1.4 km	MPC · JPL
724453	2008 AF_{76}	—	March 29, 2004	Kitt Peak	Spacewatch	·	1.7 km	MPC · JPL
724454	2008 AX_{81}	—	April 16, 2005	Kitt Peak	Spacewatch	·	890 m	MPC · JPL
724455	2008 AJ_{84}	—	November 21, 2001	Apache Point	SDSS	EOS	1.8 km	MPC · JPL
724456	2008 AN_{88}	—	January 13, 2008	Kitt Peak	Spacewatch	·	3.2 km	MPC · JPL
724457	2008 AR_{94}	—	January 14, 2008	Kitt Peak	Spacewatch	·	1.5 km	MPC · JPL
724458	2008 AM_{97}	—	January 14, 2008	Kitt Peak	Spacewatch	·	940 m	MPC · JPL
724459	2008 AO_{99}	—	January 14, 2008	Kitt Peak	Spacewatch	·	1.7 km	MPC · JPL
724460	2008 AR_{109}	—	January 15, 2008	Kitt Peak	Spacewatch	·	1.9 km	MPC · JPL
724461	2008 AL_{130}	—	January 6, 2008	Mauna Kea	P. A. Wiegert, A. M. Gilbert	·	660 m	MPC · JPL
724462	2008 AF_{134}	—	January 11, 2008	Kitt Peak	Spacewatch	·	1.6 km	MPC · JPL
724463	2008 AH_{138}	—	January 15, 2008	Mount Lemmon	Mount Lemmon Survey	·	1.1 km	MPC · JPL
724464	2008 AC_{139}	—	January 14, 2008	Kitt Peak	Spacewatch	·	510 m	MPC · JPL
724465	2008 AZ_{139}	—	January 15, 2008	Mount Lemmon	Mount Lemmon Survey	·	1.4 km	MPC · JPL
724466	2008 AU_{140}	—	January 11, 2008	Kitt Peak	Spacewatch	(12739)	1.4 km	MPC · JPL
724467	2008 AB_{142}	—	January 14, 2008	Kitt Peak	Spacewatch	·	1.3 km	MPC · JPL
724468	2008 AU_{144}	—	February 20, 2009	Mount Lemmon	Mount Lemmon Survey	·	2.3 km	MPC · JPL
724469	2008 AW_{144}	—	April 13, 2010	WISE	WISE	·	1.9 km	MPC · JPL
724470	2008 AE_{145}	—	May 10, 2010	WISE	WISE	·	2.8 km	MPC · JPL
724471	2008 AB_{146}	—	December 30, 2013	Mount Lemmon	Mount Lemmon Survey	·	2.4 km	MPC · JPL
724472	2008 AA_{147}	—	March 24, 2009	Mount Lemmon	Mount Lemmon Survey	·	2.5 km	MPC · JPL
724473	2008 AJ_{150}	—	January 12, 2008	Mount Lemmon	Mount Lemmon Survey	·	1.5 km	MPC · JPL
724474	2008 AB_{152}	—	January 13, 2008	Kitt Peak	Spacewatch	·	3.1 km	MPC · JPL
724475	2008 AH_{152}	—	January 13, 2008	Kitt Peak	Spacewatch	MAS	610 m	MPC · JPL
724476	2008 AT_{153}	—	January 11, 2008	Kitt Peak	Spacewatch	·	1.6 km	MPC · JPL
724477	2008 AR_{157}	—	January 15, 2010	WISE	WISE	ELF	2.9 km	MPC · JPL
724478	2008 BP_{1}	—	January 16, 2008	Mount Lemmon	Mount Lemmon Survey	·	3.0 km	MPC · JPL
724479	2008 BQ_{10}	—	October 15, 2007	Mount Lemmon	Mount Lemmon Survey	·	1.9 km	MPC · JPL
724480	2008 BF_{12}	—	November 16, 2006	Kitt Peak	Spacewatch	·	2.7 km	MPC · JPL
724481	2008 BB_{22}	—	January 11, 2008	Kitt Peak	Spacewatch	·	1.7 km	MPC · JPL
724482	2008 BP_{24}	—	January 11, 2008	Catalina	CSS	·	1.8 km	MPC · JPL
724483	2008 BP_{26}	—	December 30, 2007	Kitt Peak	Spacewatch	·	860 m	MPC · JPL
724484	2008 BH_{28}	—	January 30, 2008	Mount Lemmon	Mount Lemmon Survey	·	1.6 km	MPC · JPL
724485	2008 BL_{37}	—	July 12, 2005	Mount Lemmon	Mount Lemmon Survey	·	2.9 km	MPC · JPL
724486	2008 BA_{55}	—	April 9, 2002	Palomar	NEAT	·	5.1 km	MPC · JPL
724487	2008 BJ_{57}	—	January 20, 2008	Kitt Peak	Spacewatch	·	740 m	MPC · JPL
724488	2008 BQ_{57}	—	April 30, 2009	Kitt Peak	Spacewatch	·	1.5 km	MPC · JPL
724489	2008 BW_{58}	—	May 20, 2010	Kitt Peak	Spacewatch	TIR	2.6 km	MPC · JPL
724490	2008 BG_{59}	—	January 16, 2008	Mount Lemmon	Mount Lemmon Survey	·	2.4 km	MPC · JPL
724491	2008 BP_{59}	—	May 24, 2010	WISE	WISE	·	2.9 km	MPC · JPL
724492	2008 BS_{61}	—	January 19, 2008	Kitt Peak	Spacewatch	·	1.7 km	MPC · JPL
724493	2008 BU_{61}	—	January 18, 2008	Kitt Peak	Spacewatch	·	1.5 km	MPC · JPL
724494	2008 CA_{1}	—	December 18, 2007	Mount Lemmon	Mount Lemmon Survey	·	1.7 km	MPC · JPL
724495	2008 CC_{1}	—	February 2, 2008	Altschwendt	W. Ries	·	2.7 km	MPC · JPL
724496	2008 CL_{13}	—	January 11, 2008	Kitt Peak	Spacewatch	·	1.8 km	MPC · JPL
724497	2008 CY_{14}	—	February 3, 2008	Kitt Peak	Spacewatch	·	910 m	MPC · JPL
724498	2008 CE_{15}	—	February 3, 2008	Kitt Peak	Spacewatch	·	1.0 km	MPC · JPL
724499	2008 CY_{15}	—	February 3, 2008	Kitt Peak	Spacewatch	·	1.0 km	MPC · JPL
724500	2008 CH_{21}	—	February 8, 2008	Catalina	CSS	·	1.8 km	MPC · JPL

== 724501–724600 ==
back to top

Designation			Discovery			Properties		Ref
Permanent	Provisional	Named after	Date	Site	Discoverer(s)	Category	Diam.	Ref
724501	2008 CE_{27}	—	January 10, 2008	Mount Lemmon	Mount Lemmon Survey	·	1.8 km	MPC · JPL
724502	2008 CV_{30}	—	February 2, 2008	Kitt Peak	Spacewatch	·	1.2 km	MPC · JPL
724503	2008 CG_{31}	—	January 11, 2008	Kitt Peak	Spacewatch	V	510 m	MPC · JPL
724504	2008 CT_{31}	—	February 2, 2008	Kitt Peak	Spacewatch	·	1.4 km	MPC · JPL
724505	2008 CH_{33}	—	February 2, 2008	Kitt Peak	Spacewatch	·	900 m	MPC · JPL
724506	2008 CW_{47}	—	February 3, 2008	Kitt Peak	Spacewatch	·	5.1 km	MPC · JPL
724507	2008 CC_{55}	—	September 17, 2006	Kitt Peak	Spacewatch	WIT	820 m	MPC · JPL
724508	2008 CY_{55}	—	February 7, 2008	Kitt Peak	Spacewatch	·	3.1 km	MPC · JPL
724509	2008 CX_{56}	—	April 26, 2001	Kitt Peak	Spacewatch	NYS	910 m	MPC · JPL
724510	2008 CB_{57}	—	February 7, 2008	Mount Lemmon	Mount Lemmon Survey	NYS	1.0 km	MPC · JPL
724511	2008 CB_{68}	—	February 8, 2008	Kitt Peak	Spacewatch	·	1.9 km	MPC · JPL
724512	2008 CR_{69}	—	February 8, 2008	Gaisberg	Gierlinger, R.	·	860 m	MPC · JPL
724513	2008 CM_{75}	—	February 10, 2008	Nogales	J.-C. Merlin	AGN	960 m	MPC · JPL
724514	2008 CV_{75}	—	January 1, 2008	Kitt Peak	Spacewatch	·	3.3 km	MPC · JPL
724515	2008 CV_{78}	—	February 1, 2008	Kitt Peak	Spacewatch	3:2	5.5 km	MPC · JPL
724516	2008 CF_{79}	—	January 10, 2008	Mount Lemmon	Mount Lemmon Survey	·	3.3 km	MPC · JPL
724517	2008 CC_{82}	—	November 26, 2003	Kitt Peak	Spacewatch	·	590 m	MPC · JPL
724518	2008 CW_{86}	—	February 7, 2008	Mount Lemmon	Mount Lemmon Survey	·	1.7 km	MPC · JPL
724519	2008 CE_{88}	—	February 7, 2008	Mount Lemmon	Mount Lemmon Survey	·	3.7 km	MPC · JPL
724520	2008 CB_{90}	—	February 8, 2008	Kitt Peak	Spacewatch	·	1.2 km	MPC · JPL
724521	2008 CE_{90}	—	February 8, 2008	Kitt Peak	Spacewatch	·	2.7 km	MPC · JPL
724522	2008 CF_{90}	—	February 8, 2008	Mount Lemmon	Mount Lemmon Survey	·	2.3 km	MPC · JPL
724523	2008 CO_{97}	—	December 31, 2007	Mount Lemmon	Mount Lemmon Survey	·	2.9 km	MPC · JPL
724524	2008 CA_{98}	—	October 20, 2006	Kitt Peak	Spacewatch	·	1.3 km	MPC · JPL
724525	2008 CT_{101}	—	February 9, 2008	Mount Lemmon	Mount Lemmon Survey	·	1.3 km	MPC · JPL
724526	2008 CY_{103}	—	February 9, 2008	Mount Lemmon	Mount Lemmon Survey	·	1.6 km	MPC · JPL
724527	2008 CH_{104}	—	February 9, 2008	Mount Lemmon	Mount Lemmon Survey	·	900 m	MPC · JPL
724528	2008 CN_{108}	—	February 9, 2008	Catalina	CSS	·	2.0 km	MPC · JPL
724529	2008 CJ_{111}	—	February 10, 2008	Kitt Peak	Spacewatch	·	1.9 km	MPC · JPL
724530	2008 CQ_{113}	—	February 10, 2008	Kitt Peak	Spacewatch	·	900 m	MPC · JPL
724531	2008 CN_{115}	—	February 10, 2008	Mount Lemmon	Mount Lemmon Survey	GEF	960 m	MPC · JPL
724532	2008 CT_{130}	—	February 8, 2008	Kitt Peak	Spacewatch	·	1.4 km	MPC · JPL
724533	2008 CW_{135}	—	November 26, 2003	Kitt Peak	Spacewatch	·	690 m	MPC · JPL
724534	2008 CK_{136}	—	October 22, 2006	Mount Lemmon	Mount Lemmon Survey	·	1.5 km	MPC · JPL
724535	2008 CE_{147}	—	February 9, 2008	Kitt Peak	Spacewatch	·	2.0 km	MPC · JPL
724536	2008 CD_{149}	—	December 19, 2001	Apache Point	SDSS	·	2.4 km	MPC · JPL
724537	2008 CC_{151}	—	February 2, 2008	Kitt Peak	Spacewatch	AGN	1.0 km	MPC · JPL
724538	2008 CL_{163}	—	February 10, 2008	Mount Lemmon	Mount Lemmon Survey	EOS	1.4 km	MPC · JPL
724539	2008 CO_{164}	—	February 2, 2008	Kitt Peak	Spacewatch	·	1.0 km	MPC · JPL
724540	2008 CZ_{166}	—	February 11, 2008	Mount Lemmon	Mount Lemmon Survey	GAL	1.0 km	MPC · JPL
724541	2008 CF_{167}	—	February 11, 2008	Mount Lemmon	Mount Lemmon Survey	·	3.0 km	MPC · JPL
724542	2008 CD_{171}	—	February 12, 2008	Mount Lemmon	Mount Lemmon Survey	EOS	1.4 km	MPC · JPL
724543	2008 CZ_{171}	—	February 12, 2008	Mount Lemmon	Mount Lemmon Survey	LIX	4.0 km	MPC · JPL
724544	2008 CZ_{172}	—	October 20, 2003	Kitt Peak	Spacewatch	·	600 m	MPC · JPL
724545	2008 CA_{173}	—	February 13, 2008	Kitt Peak	Spacewatch	·	820 m	MPC · JPL
724546	2008 CD_{174}	—	February 13, 2008	Mount Lemmon	Mount Lemmon Survey	·	1.7 km	MPC · JPL
724547 Süßenberger	2008 CE_{177}	Süßenberger	February 11, 2008	Taunus	E. Schwab, R. Kling	·	1.2 km	MPC · JPL
724548	2008 CO_{180}	—	February 9, 2008	Catalina	CSS	·	1.5 km	MPC · JPL
724549	2008 CQ_{188}	—	February 10, 2008	Catalina	CSS	EUP	3.7 km	MPC · JPL
724550	2008 CL_{198}	—	February 12, 2008	Kitt Peak	Spacewatch	·	1.5 km	MPC · JPL
724551	2008 CT_{206}	—	February 10, 2008	Kitt Peak	Spacewatch	·	1.4 km	MPC · JPL
724552	2008 CX_{206}	—	February 12, 2008	Kitt Peak	Spacewatch	·	1.7 km	MPC · JPL
724553	2008 CZ_{206}	—	February 12, 2008	Kitt Peak	Spacewatch	·	1.4 km	MPC · JPL
724554	2008 CU_{207}	—	January 10, 2008	Mount Lemmon	Mount Lemmon Survey	·	1.8 km	MPC · JPL
724555	2008 CO_{208}	—	January 16, 2008	Mount Lemmon	Mount Lemmon Survey	DOR	2.0 km	MPC · JPL
724556	2008 CT_{209}	—	January 1, 2008	Mount Lemmon	Mount Lemmon Survey	(5)	1.2 km	MPC · JPL
724557	2008 CH_{217}	—	November 19, 2007	Mount Lemmon	Mount Lemmon Survey	·	1.1 km	MPC · JPL
724558	2008 CK_{217}	—	October 3, 2005	Catalina	CSS	HYG	3.3 km	MPC · JPL
724559	2008 CK_{219}	—	February 2, 2008	Mount Lemmon	Mount Lemmon Survey	·	1.1 km	MPC · JPL
724560	2008 CJ_{221}	—	February 16, 2015	Haleakala	Pan-STARRS 1	PHO	900 m	MPC · JPL
724561	2008 CP_{221}	—	September 4, 2011	Haleakala	Pan-STARRS 1	·	2.6 km	MPC · JPL
724562	2008 CR_{221}	—	March 17, 2013	Mount Lemmon	Mount Lemmon Survey	·	1.4 km	MPC · JPL
724563	2008 CU_{221}	—	April 30, 2012	Kitt Peak	Spacewatch	·	760 m	MPC · JPL
724564	2008 CW_{221}	—	November 28, 2011	Haleakala	Pan-STARRS 1	·	1.5 km	MPC · JPL
724565	2008 CH_{222}	—	February 7, 2008	Mount Lemmon	Mount Lemmon Survey	(883)	540 m	MPC · JPL
724566	2008 CT_{222}	—	August 15, 2013	Haleakala	Pan-STARRS 1	·	620 m	MPC · JPL
724567	2008 CG_{223}	—	August 19, 2009	Kitt Peak	Spacewatch	V	520 m	MPC · JPL
724568	2008 CK_{225}	—	October 10, 2015	Haleakala	Pan-STARRS 1	PAD	1.2 km	MPC · JPL
724569	2008 CT_{225}	—	February 16, 2015	Haleakala	Pan-STARRS 1	·	610 m	MPC · JPL
724570	2008 CR_{228}	—	March 5, 2013	Mount Lemmon	Mount Lemmon Survey	·	1.5 km	MPC · JPL
724571	2008 CT_{228}	—	February 3, 2008	Kitt Peak	Spacewatch	·	3.1 km	MPC · JPL
724572	2008 CU_{229}	—	September 16, 2010	Kitt Peak	Spacewatch	·	1.4 km	MPC · JPL
724573	2008 CV_{229}	—	January 20, 2015	Haleakala	Pan-STARRS 1	·	660 m	MPC · JPL
724574	2008 CX_{229}	—	November 11, 2010	Mount Lemmon	Mount Lemmon Survey	·	890 m	MPC · JPL
724575	2008 CD_{230}	—	January 1, 2009	Mount Lemmon	Mount Lemmon Survey	·	3.0 km	MPC · JPL
724576	2008 CE_{230}	—	February 3, 2008	Mount Lemmon	Mount Lemmon Survey	V	470 m	MPC · JPL
724577	2008 CH_{230}	—	February 13, 2008	Mount Lemmon	Mount Lemmon Survey	·	540 m	MPC · JPL
724578	2008 CN_{230}	—	February 10, 2008	Kitt Peak	Spacewatch	·	1.3 km	MPC · JPL
724579	2008 CO_{230}	—	February 2, 2008	Mount Lemmon	Mount Lemmon Survey	·	800 m	MPC · JPL
724580	2008 CE_{233}	—	February 11, 2008	Mount Lemmon	Mount Lemmon Survey	·	890 m	MPC · JPL
724581	2008 CJ_{233}	—	March 5, 2013	Haleakala	Pan-STARRS 1	AGN	880 m	MPC · JPL
724582	2008 CM_{233}	—	May 23, 2010	WISE	WISE	·	2.5 km	MPC · JPL
724583	2008 CL_{236}	—	November 4, 2014	Mount Lemmon	Mount Lemmon Survey	NYS	740 m	MPC · JPL
724584	2008 CB_{237}	—	April 3, 2017	Haleakala	Pan-STARRS 1	·	960 m	MPC · JPL
724585	2008 CD_{238}	—	February 8, 2008	Kitt Peak	Spacewatch	AGN	860 m	MPC · JPL
724586	2008 CB_{239}	—	February 9, 2008	Mount Lemmon	Mount Lemmon Survey	·	780 m	MPC · JPL
724587	2008 CC_{240}	—	February 10, 2008	Kitt Peak	Spacewatch	·	2.6 km	MPC · JPL
724588	2008 CE_{240}	—	February 12, 2008	Mount Lemmon	Mount Lemmon Survey	·	920 m	MPC · JPL
724589	2008 CA_{241}	—	February 13, 2008	Kitt Peak	Spacewatch	·	1.6 km	MPC · JPL
724590	2008 CJ_{242}	—	February 8, 2008	Mount Lemmon	Mount Lemmon Survey	GEF	1.2 km	MPC · JPL
724591	2008 CK_{243}	—	February 2, 2008	Mount Lemmon	Mount Lemmon Survey	·	2.2 km	MPC · JPL
724592	2008 CO_{246}	—	February 10, 2008	Kitt Peak	Spacewatch	TIR	2.5 km	MPC · JPL
724593	2008 CW_{248}	—	February 9, 2008	Kitt Peak	Spacewatch	·	680 m	MPC · JPL
724594	2008 CX_{248}	—	February 9, 2008	Mount Lemmon	Mount Lemmon Survey	HOF	2.1 km	MPC · JPL
724595	2008 CE_{249}	—	February 11, 2008	Mount Lemmon	Mount Lemmon Survey	·	1.6 km	MPC · JPL
724596	2008 CB_{250}	—	February 12, 2008	Kitt Peak	Spacewatch	·	1.1 km	MPC · JPL
724597	2008 DR_{3}	—	February 3, 2008	Kitt Peak	Spacewatch	·	640 m	MPC · JPL
724598	2008 DY_{3}	—	July 3, 2005	Mount Lemmon	Mount Lemmon Survey	·	1.8 km	MPC · JPL
724599	2008 DD_{6}	—	July 12, 2005	Mount Lemmon	Mount Lemmon Survey	·	3.2 km	MPC · JPL
724600	2008 DC_{8}	—	February 2, 2008	Kitt Peak	Spacewatch	·	1.3 km	MPC · JPL

== 724601–724700 ==
back to top

Designation			Discovery			Properties		Ref
Permanent	Provisional	Named after	Date	Site	Discoverer(s)	Category	Diam.	Ref
724601	2008 DO_{10}	—	January 10, 2008	Mount Lemmon	Mount Lemmon Survey	·	2.0 km	MPC · JPL
724602	2008 DW_{41}	—	January 10, 2008	Mount Lemmon	Mount Lemmon Survey	·	1.5 km	MPC · JPL
724603	2008 DD_{43}	—	February 28, 2008	Kitt Peak	Spacewatch	·	3.5 km	MPC · JPL
724604	2008 DY_{49}	—	November 11, 2006	Mount Lemmon	Mount Lemmon Survey	·	3.0 km	MPC · JPL
724605	2008 DX_{50}	—	February 29, 2008	Mount Lemmon	Mount Lemmon Survey	EUN	870 m	MPC · JPL
724606	2008 DA_{51}	—	November 15, 2006	Kitt Peak	Spacewatch	·	2.3 km	MPC · JPL
724607	2008 DT_{61}	—	February 28, 2008	Mount Lemmon	Mount Lemmon Survey	AGN	790 m	MPC · JPL
724608	2008 DV_{71}	—	October 27, 2005	Mount Lemmon	Mount Lemmon Survey	·	2.4 km	MPC · JPL
724609	2008 DU_{72}	—	February 3, 2008	Kitt Peak	Spacewatch	NYS	760 m	MPC · JPL
724610	2008 DG_{86}	—	February 28, 2008	Mount Lemmon	Mount Lemmon Survey	·	1.1 km	MPC · JPL
724611	2008 DX_{87}	—	February 28, 2008	Mount Lemmon	Mount Lemmon Survey	·	2.6 km	MPC · JPL
724612	2008 DC_{91}	—	February 28, 2008	Mount Lemmon	Mount Lemmon Survey	·	2.4 km	MPC · JPL
724613	2008 DH_{91}	—	February 28, 2008	Mount Lemmon	Mount Lemmon Survey	·	990 m	MPC · JPL
724614	2008 DM_{91}	—	February 26, 2008	Mount Lemmon	Mount Lemmon Survey	·	1.4 km	MPC · JPL
724615	2008 DU_{91}	—	August 1, 2016	Haleakala	Pan-STARRS 1	·	2.2 km	MPC · JPL
724616	2008 DP_{92}	—	May 28, 2010	WISE	WISE	·	3.0 km	MPC · JPL
724617	2008 DG_{93}	—	January 22, 2015	Haleakala	Pan-STARRS 1	NYS	620 m	MPC · JPL
724618	2008 DK_{93}	—	February 26, 2008	Mount Lemmon	Mount Lemmon Survey	·	480 m	MPC · JPL
724619	2008 DJ_{94}	—	August 2, 2016	Haleakala	Pan-STARRS 1	·	800 m	MPC · JPL
724620	2008 DQ_{94}	—	April 1, 2012	Mount Lemmon	Mount Lemmon Survey	·	950 m	MPC · JPL
724621	2008 DT_{94}	—	June 9, 2010	WISE	WISE	HOF	2.1 km	MPC · JPL
724622	2008 DG_{96}	—	February 24, 2008	Kitt Peak	Spacewatch	·	790 m	MPC · JPL
724623	2008 DO_{96}	—	February 29, 2008	Mount Lemmon	Mount Lemmon Survey	MAS	520 m	MPC · JPL
724624	2008 DA_{97}	—	February 28, 2008	Mount Lemmon	Mount Lemmon Survey	·	980 m	MPC · JPL
724625	2008 DG_{98}	—	February 18, 2008	Mount Lemmon	Mount Lemmon Survey	·	1.1 km	MPC · JPL
724626	2008 EM_{2}	—	January 20, 2008	Mount Lemmon	Mount Lemmon Survey	·	2.2 km	MPC · JPL
724627	2008 ES_{9}	—	January 12, 2008	Kitt Peak	Spacewatch	·	1.5 km	MPC · JPL
724628	2008 EU_{9}	—	February 7, 2008	Kitt Peak	Spacewatch	MAS	580 m	MPC · JPL
724629	2008 EQ_{14}	—	May 15, 2005	Mount Lemmon	Mount Lemmon Survey	·	1.6 km	MPC · JPL
724630	2008 EM_{17}	—	March 1, 2008	Kitt Peak	Spacewatch	·	1.3 km	MPC · JPL
724631	2008 EA_{18}	—	November 16, 2001	Kitt Peak	Deep Lens Survey	L5	8.9 km	MPC · JPL
724632	2008 EC_{21}	—	November 9, 2006	Kitt Peak	Spacewatch	·	1.6 km	MPC · JPL
724633	2008 EO_{21}	—	March 2, 2008	Mount Lemmon	Mount Lemmon Survey	·	820 m	MPC · JPL
724634	2008 ED_{23}	—	November 7, 2007	Mount Lemmon	Mount Lemmon Survey	JUN	920 m	MPC · JPL
724635	2008 EB_{26}	—	January 11, 2008	Kitt Peak	Spacewatch	·	1.5 km	MPC · JPL
724636	2008 EB_{27}	—	March 4, 2008	Mount Lemmon	Mount Lemmon Survey	·	1.3 km	MPC · JPL
724637	2008 EA_{43}	—	March 4, 2008	Mount Lemmon	Mount Lemmon Survey	L5	8.1 km	MPC · JPL
724638	2008 EY_{51}	—	March 6, 2008	Mount Lemmon	Mount Lemmon Survey	·	1.6 km	MPC · JPL
724639	2008 EF_{55}	—	March 6, 2008	Mount Lemmon	Mount Lemmon Survey	·	2.1 km	MPC · JPL
724640	2008 EM_{55}	—	January 11, 2008	Kitt Peak	Spacewatch	·	1.7 km	MPC · JPL
724641	2008 EP_{56}	—	August 27, 2005	Kitt Peak	Spacewatch	·	2.6 km	MPC · JPL
724642	2008 EZ_{57}	—	March 7, 2008	Mount Lemmon	Mount Lemmon Survey	·	790 m	MPC · JPL
724643	2008 ER_{62}	—	March 9, 2008	Mount Lemmon	Mount Lemmon Survey	·	1.5 km	MPC · JPL
724644	2008 EU_{71}	—	March 6, 2008	Mount Lemmon	Mount Lemmon Survey	·	750 m	MPC · JPL
724645	2008 EY_{71}	—	February 12, 2008	Mount Lemmon	Mount Lemmon Survey	V	480 m	MPC · JPL
724646	2008 EW_{80}	—	February 8, 2008	Mount Lemmon	Mount Lemmon Survey	·	1.8 km	MPC · JPL
724647	2008 EP_{81}	—	March 10, 2008	Kitt Peak	Spacewatch	·	900 m	MPC · JPL
724648	2008 EY_{82}	—	March 11, 2008	Mount Lemmon	Mount Lemmon Survey	LUT	4.5 km	MPC · JPL
724649	2008 EL_{96}	—	February 26, 2008	Mount Lemmon	Mount Lemmon Survey	KON	2.0 km	MPC · JPL
724650	2008 EV_{97}	—	March 11, 2008	Mount Lemmon	Mount Lemmon Survey	·	760 m	MPC · JPL
724651	2008 EH_{105}	—	March 6, 2008	Mount Lemmon	Mount Lemmon Survey	·	1.5 km	MPC · JPL
724652	2008 ET_{106}	—	March 6, 2008	Mount Lemmon	Mount Lemmon Survey	·	2.7 km	MPC · JPL
724653	2008 ET_{109}	—	August 23, 2006	Palomar	NEAT	·	930 m	MPC · JPL
724654	2008 EH_{112}	—	March 8, 2008	Kitt Peak	Spacewatch	·	1.1 km	MPC · JPL
724655	2008 ER_{114}	—	March 8, 2008	Kitt Peak	Spacewatch	·	1 km	MPC · JPL
724656	2008 EP_{118}	—	February 26, 2008	Mount Lemmon	Mount Lemmon Survey	·	1.6 km	MPC · JPL
724657	2008 ES_{118}	—	March 9, 2008	Mount Lemmon	Mount Lemmon Survey	EOS	1.7 km	MPC · JPL
724658	2008 EN_{119}	—	March 9, 2008	Mount Lemmon	Mount Lemmon Survey	·	1.5 km	MPC · JPL
724659	2008 EU_{119}	—	March 1, 2008	Kitt Peak	Spacewatch	·	800 m	MPC · JPL
724660	2008 EN_{128}	—	March 11, 2008	Kitt Peak	Spacewatch	·	3.9 km	MPC · JPL
724661	2008 EH_{131}	—	March 11, 2008	Kitt Peak	Spacewatch	ELF	2.9 km	MPC · JPL
724662	2008 EW_{132}	—	February 10, 2008	Kitt Peak	Spacewatch	GEF	1.0 km	MPC · JPL
724663	2008 EP_{141}	—	March 12, 2008	Mount Lemmon	Mount Lemmon Survey	·	960 m	MPC · JPL
724664	2008 EZ_{162}	—	March 15, 2008	Mount Lemmon	Mount Lemmon Survey	MAS	590 m	MPC · JPL
724665	2008 EF_{164}	—	November 28, 2011	Kitt Peak	Spacewatch	·	2.8 km	MPC · JPL
724666 Unda-Sanzana	2008 EX_{169}	Unda-Sanzana	March 13, 2008	La Silla	O. Vaduvescu, M. Birlan	·	1.4 km	MPC · JPL
724667	2008 ER_{171}	—	March 10, 2008	Kitt Peak	Spacewatch	CLA	1.2 km	MPC · JPL
724668	2008 EB_{175}	—	September 2, 2013	Mount Lemmon	Mount Lemmon Survey	·	780 m	MPC · JPL
724669	2008 EF_{175}	—	February 28, 2012	Haleakala	Pan-STARRS 1	·	910 m	MPC · JPL
724670	2008 EH_{175}	—	June 27, 2014	Haleakala	Pan-STARRS 1	·	1.8 km	MPC · JPL
724671	2008 EL_{175}	—	June 17, 2009	Kitt Peak	Spacewatch	V	470 m	MPC · JPL
724672	2008 EO_{175}	—	January 16, 2015	Haleakala	Pan-STARRS 1	·	720 m	MPC · JPL
724673	2008 ER_{175}	—	June 8, 2010	WISE	WISE	URS	3.0 km	MPC · JPL
724674	2008 EU_{175}	—	September 10, 2010	Kitt Peak	Spacewatch	·	1.5 km	MPC · JPL
724675	2008 EV_{175}	—	October 19, 2011	Mount Lemmon	Mount Lemmon Survey	·	2.9 km	MPC · JPL
724676	2008 EA_{176}	—	March 8, 2008	Mount Lemmon	Mount Lemmon Survey	·	1.5 km	MPC · JPL
724677	2008 EX_{177}	—	March 11, 2008	Kitt Peak	Spacewatch	·	1.8 km	MPC · JPL
724678	2008 EX_{180}	—	March 7, 2008	Mount Lemmon	Mount Lemmon Survey	·	720 m	MPC · JPL
724679	2008 ED_{181}	—	May 15, 2012	Haleakala	Pan-STARRS 1	·	670 m	MPC · JPL
724680	2008 EF_{182}	—	December 29, 2011	Mount Lemmon	Mount Lemmon Survey	·	1.7 km	MPC · JPL
724681	2008 EN_{183}	—	June 6, 2010	WISE	WISE	·	2.0 km	MPC · JPL
724682	2008 EF_{184}	—	February 29, 2008	Kitt Peak	Spacewatch	DOR	1.8 km	MPC · JPL
724683	2008 EM_{184}	—	August 29, 2016	Mount Lemmon	Mount Lemmon Survey	·	590 m	MPC · JPL
724684	2008 EA_{186}	—	September 23, 2015	Haleakala	Pan-STARRS 1	·	1.5 km	MPC · JPL
724685	2008 EL_{186}	—	October 7, 1996	Kitt Peak	Spacewatch	·	1.5 km	MPC · JPL
724686	2008 EM_{186}	—	October 12, 2010	Kitt Peak	Spacewatch	KOR	1.1 km	MPC · JPL
724687	2008 ES_{186}	—	October 15, 2015	Haleakala	Pan-STARRS 1	·	1.4 km	MPC · JPL
724688	2008 EZ_{186}	—	September 9, 2015	Haleakala	Pan-STARRS 1	HOF	2.2 km	MPC · JPL
724689	2008 EH_{189}	—	March 14, 2013	Kitt Peak	Spacewatch	·	1.5 km	MPC · JPL
724690	2008 EC_{190}	—	March 10, 2008	Kitt Peak	Spacewatch	·	1.7 km	MPC · JPL
724691	2008 ES_{190}	—	March 5, 2008	Mount Lemmon	Mount Lemmon Survey	·	1.5 km	MPC · JPL
724692	2008 EJ_{191}	—	March 13, 2008	Kitt Peak	Spacewatch	·	650 m	MPC · JPL
724693	2008 EO_{191}	—	March 8, 2008	Kitt Peak	Spacewatch	·	640 m	MPC · JPL
724694	2008 EG_{192}	—	March 6, 2008	Mount Lemmon	Mount Lemmon Survey	EOS	1.9 km	MPC · JPL
724695	2008 EB_{193}	—	March 5, 2008	Kitt Peak	Spacewatch	KOR	1.3 km	MPC · JPL
724696	2008 EU_{194}	—	March 11, 2008	Mount Lemmon	Mount Lemmon Survey	L5	5.8 km	MPC · JPL
724697	2008 FW_{2}	—	January 28, 2004	Kitt Peak	Spacewatch	·	840 m	MPC · JPL
724698	2008 FF_{3}	—	January 30, 2008	Mount Lemmon	Mount Lemmon Survey	·	1.7 km	MPC · JPL
724699	2008 FW_{10}	—	February 8, 2008	Kitt Peak	Spacewatch	·	740 m	MPC · JPL
724700	2008 FC_{12}	—	November 11, 2006	Mount Lemmon	Mount Lemmon Survey	·	960 m	MPC · JPL

== 724701–724800 ==
back to top

Designation			Discovery			Properties		Ref
Permanent	Provisional	Named after	Date	Site	Discoverer(s)	Category	Diam.	Ref
724701	2008 FF_{17}	—	February 10, 2008	Kitt Peak	Spacewatch	·	720 m	MPC · JPL
724702	2008 FJ_{21}	—	March 9, 2008	Kitt Peak	Spacewatch	·	900 m	MPC · JPL
724703	2008 FT_{28}	—	February 1, 2003	Kitt Peak	Spacewatch	KOR	1.4 km	MPC · JPL
724704	2008 FR_{30}	—	February 24, 2008	Kitt Peak	Spacewatch	·	1.2 km	MPC · JPL
724705	2008 FQ_{36}	—	March 28, 2008	Mount Lemmon	Mount Lemmon Survey	MAS	650 m	MPC · JPL
724706	2008 FR_{43}	—	March 28, 2008	Mount Lemmon	Mount Lemmon Survey	·	2.4 km	MPC · JPL
724707	2008 FW_{44}	—	March 8, 2008	Mount Lemmon	Mount Lemmon Survey	(7605)	2.7 km	MPC · JPL
724708	2008 FD_{46}	—	March 28, 2008	Mount Lemmon	Mount Lemmon Survey	·	1.5 km	MPC · JPL
724709	2008 FJ_{47}	—	March 7, 2003	Kitt Peak	Deep Lens Survey	·	1.4 km	MPC · JPL
724710	2008 FP_{51}	—	March 28, 2008	Mount Lemmon	Mount Lemmon Survey	NYS	970 m	MPC · JPL
724711	2008 FX_{58}	—	March 29, 2008	Kitt Peak	Spacewatch	·	2.8 km	MPC · JPL
724712	2008 FP_{64}	—	March 28, 2008	Kitt Peak	Spacewatch	·	3.2 km	MPC · JPL
724713	2008 FD_{71}	—	March 12, 2008	Kitt Peak	Spacewatch	·	4.2 km	MPC · JPL
724714	2008 FF_{72}	—	March 30, 2008	Kitt Peak	Spacewatch	·	2.9 km	MPC · JPL
724715	2008 FB_{74}	—	March 31, 2008	Kitt Peak	Spacewatch	·	1.8 km	MPC · JPL
724716	2008 FA_{82}	—	March 11, 2008	Kitt Peak	Spacewatch	PAD	1.3 km	MPC · JPL
724717	2008 FV_{83}	—	March 28, 2008	Kitt Peak	Spacewatch	·	1.5 km	MPC · JPL
724718	2008 FD_{88}	—	March 28, 2008	Mount Lemmon	Mount Lemmon Survey	·	1.3 km	MPC · JPL
724719	2008 FS_{90}	—	February 11, 2008	Kitt Peak	Spacewatch	·	1.9 km	MPC · JPL
724720	2008 FO_{96}	—	March 29, 2008	Kitt Peak	Spacewatch	·	930 m	MPC · JPL
724721	2008 FD_{104}	—	March 30, 2008	Kitt Peak	Spacewatch	·	970 m	MPC · JPL
724722	2008 FB_{106}	—	March 31, 2008	Kitt Peak	Spacewatch	EOS	1.4 km	MPC · JPL
724723	2008 FP_{109}	—	March 31, 2008	Mount Lemmon	Mount Lemmon Survey	·	1.4 km	MPC · JPL
724724	2008 FL_{138}	—	September 5, 2000	Apache Point	SDSS	L5	8.7 km	MPC · JPL
724725	2008 FO_{139}	—	March 31, 2008	Mount Lemmon	Mount Lemmon Survey	·	3.0 km	MPC · JPL
724726	2008 FL_{142}	—	October 16, 2009	Mount Lemmon	Mount Lemmon Survey	·	600 m	MPC · JPL
724727	2008 FY_{142}	—	July 18, 2010	WISE	WISE	·	2.8 km	MPC · JPL
724728	2008 FD_{146}	—	March 29, 2008	Catalina	CSS	·	830 m	MPC · JPL
724729	2008 FK_{146}	—	March 30, 2008	Kitt Peak	Spacewatch	NYS	920 m	MPC · JPL
724730	2008 FD_{147}	—	March 30, 2008	Kitt Peak	Spacewatch	·	1.7 km	MPC · JPL
724731	2008 FG_{147}	—	March 29, 2008	Mount Lemmon	Mount Lemmon Survey	·	570 m	MPC · JPL
724732	2008 GJ_{5}	—	April 1, 2008	Kitt Peak	Spacewatch	·	2.3 km	MPC · JPL
724733	2008 GX_{7}	—	April 1, 2008	Kitt Peak	Spacewatch	·	1.9 km	MPC · JPL
724734	2008 GO_{9}	—	April 1, 2008	Kitt Peak	Spacewatch	L5	6.6 km	MPC · JPL
724735	2008 GJ_{12}	—	March 8, 2008	Mount Lemmon	Mount Lemmon Survey	MAS	540 m	MPC · JPL
724736	2008 GF_{16}	—	April 3, 2008	Mount Lemmon	Mount Lemmon Survey	·	2.4 km	MPC · JPL
724737	2008 GY_{18}	—	April 4, 2008	Mount Lemmon	Mount Lemmon Survey	·	810 m	MPC · JPL
724738	2008 GD_{36}	—	April 3, 2008	Kitt Peak	Spacewatch	·	810 m	MPC · JPL
724739	2008 GT_{39}	—	March 26, 2008	Mount Lemmon	Mount Lemmon Survey	MRX	820 m	MPC · JPL
724740	2008 GU_{43}	—	April 4, 2008	Mount Lemmon	Mount Lemmon Survey	AGN	990 m	MPC · JPL
724741	2008 GQ_{52}	—	March 28, 2008	Mount Lemmon	Mount Lemmon Survey	·	1.1 km	MPC · JPL
724742	2008 GA_{53}	—	September 25, 2005	Kitt Peak	Spacewatch	VER	2.9 km	MPC · JPL
724743	2008 GG_{57}	—	March 28, 2008	Mount Lemmon	Mount Lemmon Survey	·	780 m	MPC · JPL
724744	2008 GW_{64}	—	November 27, 2006	Mount Lemmon	Mount Lemmon Survey	KOR	1.8 km	MPC · JPL
724745	2008 GX_{74}	—	March 28, 2008	Kitt Peak	Spacewatch	·	1.2 km	MPC · JPL
724746	2008 GR_{75}	—	April 7, 2008	Kitt Peak	Spacewatch	EOS	1.6 km	MPC · JPL
724747	2008 GH_{80}	—	April 7, 2008	Mount Lemmon	Mount Lemmon Survey	L5	6.6 km	MPC · JPL
724748	2008 GL_{88}	—	October 12, 2005	Kitt Peak	Spacewatch	·	1.7 km	MPC · JPL
724749	2008 GR_{100}	—	April 9, 2008	Kitt Peak	Spacewatch	NYS	1.1 km	MPC · JPL
724750	2008 GF_{107}	—	April 12, 2008	Mount Lemmon	Mount Lemmon Survey	·	1.6 km	MPC · JPL
724751	2008 GR_{108}	—	April 13, 2008	Mount Lemmon	Mount Lemmon Survey	·	1.8 km	MPC · JPL
724752	2008 GG_{118}	—	October 1, 2005	Mount Lemmon	Mount Lemmon Survey	HOF	2.1 km	MPC · JPL
724753	2008 GQ_{118}	—	April 11, 2008	Mount Lemmon	Mount Lemmon Survey	·	1.8 km	MPC · JPL
724754	2008 GV_{120}	—	March 20, 2001	Anderson Mesa	LONEOS	·	760 m	MPC · JPL
724755	2008 GW_{138}	—	April 6, 2008	Kitt Peak	Spacewatch	MAS	540 m	MPC · JPL
724756	2008 GB_{150}	—	April 15, 2008	Mount Lemmon	Mount Lemmon Survey	·	1.6 km	MPC · JPL
724757	2008 GT_{150}	—	January 24, 2012	Haleakala	Pan-STARRS 1	·	2.0 km	MPC · JPL
724758	2008 GK_{152}	—	October 29, 2014	Haleakala	Pan-STARRS 1	L5	6.7 km	MPC · JPL
724759	2008 GB_{153}	—	April 15, 2008	Mount Lemmon	Mount Lemmon Survey	·	1.4 km	MPC · JPL
724760	2008 GM_{153}	—	April 11, 2008	Mount Lemmon	Mount Lemmon Survey	·	1.4 km	MPC · JPL
724761	2008 GT_{153}	—	April 14, 2008	Mount Lemmon	Mount Lemmon Survey	·	1.9 km	MPC · JPL
724762	2008 GG_{154}	—	December 29, 2011	Kitt Peak	Spacewatch	·	1.5 km	MPC · JPL
724763	2008 GO_{154}	—	April 7, 2008	Mount Lemmon	Mount Lemmon Survey	NEM	1.8 km	MPC · JPL
724764	2008 GJ_{155}	—	April 11, 2008	Mount Lemmon	Mount Lemmon Survey	·	1.5 km	MPC · JPL
724765	2008 GO_{155}	—	July 26, 2010	WISE	WISE	·	1.7 km	MPC · JPL
724766	2008 GM_{157}	—	March 4, 2008	Mount Lemmon	Mount Lemmon Survey	·	1.9 km	MPC · JPL
724767	2008 GN_{157}	—	June 22, 2010	WISE	WISE	·	1.7 km	MPC · JPL
724768	2008 GO_{160}	—	April 15, 2008	Kitt Peak	Spacewatch	·	1.1 km	MPC · JPL
724769	2008 GT_{162}	—	April 8, 2008	Mount Lemmon	Mount Lemmon Survey	·	2.1 km	MPC · JPL
724770	2008 GV_{162}	—	August 15, 2014	Haleakala	Pan-STARRS 1	AGN	920 m	MPC · JPL
724771	2008 GZ_{162}	—	April 14, 2008	Mount Lemmon	Mount Lemmon Survey	·	2.6 km	MPC · JPL
724772	2008 GH_{163}	—	April 6, 2008	Kitt Peak	Spacewatch	L5	7.1 km	MPC · JPL
724773	2008 GK_{165}	—	April 4, 2008	Kitt Peak	Spacewatch	615	1.1 km	MPC · JPL
724774	2008 GN_{165}	—	February 8, 2011	Mount Lemmon	Mount Lemmon Survey	·	690 m	MPC · JPL
724775	2008 GA_{166}	—	April 5, 2008	Mount Lemmon	Mount Lemmon Survey	·	1.9 km	MPC · JPL
724776	2008 GJ_{169}	—	April 9, 2008	Kitt Peak	Spacewatch	·	960 m	MPC · JPL
724777	2008 GL_{169}	—	April 6, 2008	Kitt Peak	Spacewatch	·	2.6 km	MPC · JPL
724778	2008 GQ_{170}	—	April 3, 2008	Mount Lemmon	Mount Lemmon Survey	L5	7.1 km	MPC · JPL
724779	2008 GR_{170}	—	April 4, 2008	Mount Lemmon	Mount Lemmon Survey	L5	8.0 km	MPC · JPL
724780	2008 GJ_{171}	—	April 4, 2008	Kitt Peak	Spacewatch	L5	6.4 km	MPC · JPL
724781	2008 GP_{171}	—	April 14, 2008	Mount Lemmon	Mount Lemmon Survey	KOR	980 m	MPC · JPL
724782	2008 GR_{171}	—	April 8, 2008	Mount Lemmon	Mount Lemmon Survey	CLA	1.2 km	MPC · JPL
724783	2008 GD_{174}	—	April 7, 2008	Kitt Peak	Spacewatch	PAD	1.2 km	MPC · JPL
724784	2008 HS	—	March 13, 2008	Kitt Peak	Spacewatch	·	890 m	MPC · JPL
724785	2008 HJ_{7}	—	March 27, 2008	Mount Lemmon	Mount Lemmon Survey	L5	8.3 km	MPC · JPL
724786	2008 HF_{10}	—	April 24, 2008	Mount Lemmon	Mount Lemmon Survey	L5 · (17492)	7.2 km	MPC · JPL
724787	2008 HE_{11}	—	December 21, 2006	Kitt Peak	L. H. Wasserman, M. W. Buie	·	1.7 km	MPC · JPL
724788	2008 HX_{13}	—	April 25, 2008	Kitt Peak	Spacewatch	·	1.2 km	MPC · JPL
724789	2008 HD_{14}	—	April 11, 2008	Mount Lemmon	Mount Lemmon Survey	EUN	920 m	MPC · JPL
724790	2008 HA_{27}	—	September 11, 2005	Kitt Peak	Spacewatch	·	950 m	MPC · JPL
724791	2008 HX_{30}	—	April 29, 2008	Mount Lemmon	Mount Lemmon Survey	BRA	1.1 km	MPC · JPL
724792	2008 HK_{31}	—	April 29, 2008	Mount Lemmon	Mount Lemmon Survey	·	670 m	MPC · JPL
724793	2008 HL_{41}	—	April 26, 2008	Mount Lemmon	Mount Lemmon Survey	·	980 m	MPC · JPL
724794	2008 HD_{42}	—	April 26, 2008	Mount Lemmon	Mount Lemmon Survey	·	910 m	MPC · JPL
724795	2008 HL_{50}	—	April 14, 2008	Kitt Peak	Spacewatch	·	1.7 km	MPC · JPL
724796	2008 HU_{54}	—	April 29, 2008	Kitt Peak	Spacewatch	L5	6.7 km	MPC · JPL
724797	2008 HK_{55}	—	April 29, 2008	Kitt Peak	Spacewatch	·	570 m	MPC · JPL
724798	2008 HN_{58}	—	September 17, 2006	Kitt Peak	Spacewatch	·	810 m	MPC · JPL
724799	2008 HQ_{59}	—	April 30, 2008	Mount Lemmon	Mount Lemmon Survey	·	2.2 km	MPC · JPL
724800	2008 HH_{61}	—	April 30, 2008	Mount Lemmon	Mount Lemmon Survey	DOR	2.1 km	MPC · JPL

== 724801–724900 ==
back to top

Designation			Discovery			Properties		Ref
Permanent	Provisional	Named after	Date	Site	Discoverer(s)	Category	Diam.	Ref
724801	2008 HX_{61}	—	May 23, 2001	Cerro Tololo	Deep Ecliptic Survey	MAS	570 m	MPC · JPL
724802	2008 HT_{64}	—	February 25, 2003	Campo Imperatore	CINEOS	·	1.5 km	MPC · JPL
724803	2008 HE_{72}	—	October 9, 2010	Mount Lemmon	Mount Lemmon Survey	·	1.7 km	MPC · JPL
724804	2008 HN_{73}	—	April 30, 2008	Kitt Peak	Spacewatch	L5	7.5 km	MPC · JPL
724805	2008 HO_{74}	—	October 12, 2010	Mount Lemmon	Mount Lemmon Survey	·	1.4 km	MPC · JPL
724806	2008 HZ_{75}	—	April 29, 2008	Kitt Peak	Spacewatch	L5	8.2 km	MPC · JPL
724807	2008 HR_{76}	—	June 13, 2018	Haleakala	Pan-STARRS 1	·	1.6 km	MPC · JPL
724808	2008 HU_{77}	—	April 29, 2008	Kitt Peak	Spacewatch	·	1.9 km	MPC · JPL
724809	2008 HW_{78}	—	April 28, 2008	Mount Lemmon	Mount Lemmon Survey	·	2.9 km	MPC · JPL
724810	2008 JZ	—	April 29, 2008	Mount Lemmon	Mount Lemmon Survey	·	1.6 km	MPC · JPL
724811	2008 JL_{5}	—	March 15, 2008	Mount Lemmon	Mount Lemmon Survey	AGN	1.0 km	MPC · JPL
724812	2008 JG_{8}	—	May 5, 2008	Bergisch Gladbach	W. Bickel	·	2.9 km	MPC · JPL
724813	2008 JE_{18}	—	May 4, 2008	Kitt Peak	Spacewatch	·	520 m	MPC · JPL
724814	2008 JN_{19}	—	April 5, 2008	Mount Lemmon	Mount Lemmon Survey	·	920 m	MPC · JPL
724815	2008 JC_{25}	—	May 11, 2008	Mount Lemmon	Mount Lemmon Survey	·	2.3 km	MPC · JPL
724816	2008 JO_{25}	—	April 1, 2003	Apache Point	SDSS Collaboration	·	2.3 km	MPC · JPL
724817	2008 JK_{43}	—	December 25, 2013	Mount Lemmon	Mount Lemmon Survey	V	510 m	MPC · JPL
724818	2008 JQ_{43}	—	September 15, 2009	Kitt Peak	Spacewatch	·	600 m	MPC · JPL
724819	2008 JU_{43}	—	March 18, 2015	Haleakala	Pan-STARRS 1	·	690 m	MPC · JPL
724820	2008 JK_{46}	—	May 14, 2008	Mount Lemmon	Mount Lemmon Survey	·	1.5 km	MPC · JPL
724821	2008 JW_{46}	—	September 14, 2013	Kitt Peak	Spacewatch	·	950 m	MPC · JPL
724822	2008 JK_{47}	—	January 27, 2011	Mount Lemmon	Mount Lemmon Survey	·	790 m	MPC · JPL
724823	2008 JH_{49}	—	July 5, 2010	WISE	WISE	·	2.7 km	MPC · JPL
724824	2008 JT_{49}	—	May 8, 2008	Kitt Peak	Spacewatch	L5	7.2 km	MPC · JPL
724825	2008 JA_{50}	—	May 3, 2008	Kitt Peak	Spacewatch	·	1.1 km	MPC · JPL
724826	2008 JW_{50}	—	May 3, 2008	Kitt Peak	Spacewatch	L5	8.0 km	MPC · JPL
724827	2008 JQ_{51}	—	May 3, 2008	Kitt Peak	Spacewatch	L5	8.0 km	MPC · JPL
724828	2008 JL_{54}	—	May 5, 2008	Mount Lemmon	Mount Lemmon Survey	·	1.1 km	MPC · JPL
724829	2008 KR_{6}	—	May 8, 2008	Mount Lemmon	Mount Lemmon Survey	MAS	580 m	MPC · JPL
724830	2008 KR_{13}	—	May 27, 2008	Kitt Peak	Spacewatch	·	1.6 km	MPC · JPL
724831	2008 KU_{19}	—	April 15, 2008	Kitt Peak	Spacewatch	AGN	940 m	MPC · JPL
724832	2008 KN_{21}	—	May 28, 2008	Mount Lemmon	Mount Lemmon Survey	·	2.1 km	MPC · JPL
724833	2008 KS_{21}	—	May 4, 2008	Kitt Peak	Spacewatch	·	1.3 km	MPC · JPL
724834	2008 KB_{24}	—	May 28, 2008	Kitt Peak	Spacewatch	·	1.7 km	MPC · JPL
724835	2008 KF_{25}	—	May 29, 2008	Kitt Peak	Spacewatch	·	1.5 km	MPC · JPL
724836	2008 KB_{32}	—	November 11, 2001	Apache Point	SDSS Collaboration	·	1.8 km	MPC · JPL
724837	2008 KB_{45}	—	August 22, 2014	Haleakala	Pan-STARRS 1	·	1.9 km	MPC · JPL
724838	2008 KS_{45}	—	October 8, 2015	Haleakala	Pan-STARRS 1	615	1.1 km	MPC · JPL
724839	2008 KM_{46}	—	February 22, 2011	Kitt Peak	Spacewatch	·	530 m	MPC · JPL
724840	2008 KW_{46}	—	August 30, 2016	Kitt Peak	Spacewatch	·	810 m	MPC · JPL
724841	2008 KQ_{47}	—	May 28, 2008	Mount Lemmon	Mount Lemmon Survey	·	1.6 km	MPC · JPL
724842	2008 LN_{1}	—	June 2, 2008	Mount Lemmon	Mount Lemmon Survey	URS	2.5 km	MPC · JPL
724843	2008 LG_{6}	—	June 3, 2008	Kitt Peak	Spacewatch	EOS	1.4 km	MPC · JPL
724844	2008 LS_{8}	—	May 28, 2008	Kitt Peak	Spacewatch	·	1.4 km	MPC · JPL
724845	2008 LT_{12}	—	June 9, 2008	Bergisch Gladbach	W. Bickel	·	3.0 km	MPC · JPL
724846	2008 LA_{13}	—	June 6, 2008	Kitt Peak	Spacewatch	L5	6.8 km	MPC · JPL
724847	2008 LT_{15}	—	June 9, 2008	Kitt Peak	Spacewatch	·	1.5 km	MPC · JPL
724848	2008 LM_{17}	—	June 10, 2008	Kitt Peak	Spacewatch	·	1.6 km	MPC · JPL
724849	2008 LL_{18}	—	January 14, 2002	Apache Point	SDSS	L5	8.9 km	MPC · JPL
724850	2008 MH_{3}	—	May 14, 2008	Mount Lemmon	Mount Lemmon Survey	·	1.2 km	MPC · JPL
724851	2008 MT_{5}	—	June 30, 2008	Kitt Peak	Spacewatch	·	2.6 km	MPC · JPL
724852	2008 NF	—	January 10, 2002	Bohyunsan	Y.-B. Jeon, K.-K. Lee	·	2.1 km	MPC · JPL
724853	2008 NZ_{2}	—	July 4, 2008	Palomar Mountain	Palomar	MAS	800 m	MPC · JPL
724854	2008 NS_{5}	—	January 18, 2010	WISE	WISE	·	3.0 km	MPC · JPL
724855	2008 NU_{5}	—	November 18, 2009	Kitt Peak	Spacewatch	·	3.8 km	MPC · JPL
724856	2008 OH_{9}	—	May 29, 2008	Mount Lemmon	Mount Lemmon Survey	·	2.5 km	MPC · JPL
724857	2008 OJ_{9}	—	July 29, 2008	La Sagra	OAM	·	3.5 km	MPC · JPL
724858	2008 OJ_{14}	—	August 23, 2004	Anderson Mesa	LONEOS	ADE	2.5 km	MPC · JPL
724859	2008 OO_{26}	—	February 10, 2011	Mount Lemmon	Mount Lemmon Survey	EOS	1.5 km	MPC · JPL
724860	2008 OJ_{27}	—	October 19, 2003	Apache Point	SDSS Collaboration	EOS	1.9 km	MPC · JPL
724861	2008 OK_{27}	—	May 12, 2012	Mount Lemmon	Mount Lemmon Survey	·	1.2 km	MPC · JPL
724862	2008 OO_{27}	—	February 6, 2010	WISE	WISE	·	2.2 km	MPC · JPL
724863	2008 OT_{27}	—	February 25, 2011	Mount Lemmon	Mount Lemmon Survey	MAS	650 m	MPC · JPL
724864	2008 OF_{29}	—	December 10, 2005	Kitt Peak	Spacewatch	·	680 m	MPC · JPL
724865	2008 OY_{30}	—	July 29, 2008	Mount Lemmon	Mount Lemmon Survey	·	2.0 km	MPC · JPL
724866	2008 PT_{3}	—	August 3, 2008	Marly	P. Kocher	·	1.7 km	MPC · JPL
724867	2008 PE_{12}	—	September 19, 2003	Kitt Peak	Spacewatch	·	2.8 km	MPC · JPL
724868	2008 PO_{13}	—	August 20, 2003	Campo Imperatore	CINEOS	·	1.7 km	MPC · JPL
724869	2008 PD_{24}	—	August 7, 2008	Kitt Peak	Spacewatch	NYS	970 m	MPC · JPL
724870	2008 QC_{24}	—	August 21, 2008	Kitt Peak	Spacewatch	·	840 m	MPC · JPL
724871	2008 QU_{25}	—	August 28, 2008	Charleston	R. Holmes	·	2.2 km	MPC · JPL
724872	2008 QH_{29}	—	August 28, 2008	Zelenchukskaya	Station, Zelenchukskaya	·	2.2 km	MPC · JPL
724873	2008 QX_{29}	—	August 2, 2008	La Sagra	OAM	·	2.4 km	MPC · JPL
724874	2008 QY_{29}	—	March 14, 2007	Mount Lemmon	Mount Lemmon Survey	·	1.1 km	MPC · JPL
724875 Hengchun	2008 QK_{33}	Hengchun	August 29, 2008	Lulin	LUSS	·	1.5 km	MPC · JPL
724876	2008 RS_{6}	—	September 3, 2008	Kitt Peak	Spacewatch	·	2.5 km	MPC · JPL
724877	2008 RT_{7}	—	September 3, 2008	Kitt Peak	Spacewatch	·	3.2 km	MPC · JPL
724878	2008 RD_{10}	—	September 3, 2008	Kitt Peak	Spacewatch	·	740 m	MPC · JPL
724879	2008 RQ_{11}	—	September 3, 2008	Kitt Peak	Spacewatch	·	840 m	MPC · JPL
724880	2008 RN_{14}	—	September 4, 2008	Kitt Peak	Spacewatch	T_{j} (2.98) · 3:2	5.2 km	MPC · JPL
724881	2008 RE_{16}	—	November 1, 2005	Kitt Peak	Spacewatch	·	520 m	MPC · JPL
724882	2008 RP_{19}	—	August 24, 2008	Kitt Peak	Spacewatch	·	1.5 km	MPC · JPL
724883	2008 RV_{22}	—	September 5, 2008	Kachina	Hobart, J.	EOS	1.5 km	MPC · JPL
724884	2008 RQ_{33}	—	September 2, 2008	Kitt Peak	Spacewatch	EOS	1.4 km	MPC · JPL
724885	2008 RQ_{40}	—	September 2, 2008	Kitt Peak	Spacewatch	·	2.5 km	MPC · JPL
724886	2008 RN_{48}	—	September 3, 2008	Kitt Peak	Spacewatch	·	3.0 km	MPC · JPL
724887	2008 RB_{50}	—	September 3, 2008	Kitt Peak	Spacewatch	·	2.9 km	MPC · JPL
724888	2008 RP_{51}	—	September 3, 2008	Kitt Peak	Spacewatch	·	3.0 km	MPC · JPL
724889	2008 RN_{54}	—	July 29, 2008	Mount Lemmon	Mount Lemmon Survey	·	2.5 km	MPC · JPL
724890	2008 RC_{55}	—	September 3, 2008	Kitt Peak	Spacewatch	·	1.3 km	MPC · JPL
724891	2008 RP_{60}	—	September 4, 2008	Kitt Peak	Spacewatch	·	1.5 km	MPC · JPL
724892	2008 RE_{61}	—	September 4, 2008	Kitt Peak	Spacewatch	·	2.2 km	MPC · JPL
724893	2008 RZ_{65}	—	September 4, 2008	Kitt Peak	Spacewatch	·	2.0 km	MPC · JPL
724894	2008 RF_{69}	—	September 4, 2008	Kitt Peak	Spacewatch	·	2.5 km	MPC · JPL
724895	2008 RL_{77}	—	September 6, 2008	Catalina	CSS	·	2.0 km	MPC · JPL
724896	2008 RH_{90}	—	September 25, 2003	Palomar	NEAT	EOS	1.9 km	MPC · JPL
724897	2008 RN_{90}	—	August 7, 2008	Kitt Peak	Spacewatch	·	1.5 km	MPC · JPL
724898	2008 RQ_{91}	—	September 6, 2008	Kitt Peak	Spacewatch	·	2.1 km	MPC · JPL
724899	2008 RS_{119}	—	November 18, 2003	Kitt Peak	Spacewatch	·	2.3 km	MPC · JPL
724900	2008 RZ_{120}	—	September 9, 2008	Mount Lemmon	Mount Lemmon Survey	VER	3.1 km	MPC · JPL

== 724901–725000 ==
back to top

Designation			Discovery			Properties		Ref
Permanent	Provisional	Named after	Date	Site	Discoverer(s)	Category	Diam.	Ref
724901	2008 RO_{123}	—	September 6, 2008	Kitt Peak	Spacewatch	·	2.0 km	MPC · JPL
724902	2008 RZ_{127}	—	September 6, 2008	Kitt Peak	Spacewatch	·	2.4 km	MPC · JPL
724903	2008 RT_{136}	—	September 4, 2008	Kitt Peak	Spacewatch	·	2.2 km	MPC · JPL
724904	2008 RN_{138}	—	October 9, 1999	Socorro	LINEAR	AEO	1.3 km	MPC · JPL
724905	2008 RQ_{143}	—	March 12, 2003	Kitt Peak	Spacewatch	·	1.1 km	MPC · JPL
724906	2008 RR_{149}	—	September 18, 2003	Kitt Peak	Spacewatch	·	1.8 km	MPC · JPL
724907	2008 RZ_{150}	—	September 10, 2008	Charleston	R. Holmes	EOS	1.5 km	MPC · JPL
724908	2008 RO_{151}	—	September 2, 2014	Haleakala	Pan-STARRS 1	·	1.5 km	MPC · JPL
724909	2008 RX_{151}	—	September 7, 2008	Mount Lemmon	Mount Lemmon Survey	·	910 m	MPC · JPL
724910	2008 RW_{152}	—	December 16, 2009	Mount Lemmon	Mount Lemmon Survey	T_{j} (2.99) · (895)	3.6 km	MPC · JPL
724911	2008 RW_{155}	—	March 14, 2010	Kitt Peak	Spacewatch	·	1.4 km	MPC · JPL
724912	2008 RJ_{156}	—	September 6, 2008	Mount Lemmon	Mount Lemmon Survey	T_{j} (2.99) · EUP	2.7 km	MPC · JPL
724913	2008 RT_{156}	—	September 7, 2008	Mount Lemmon	Mount Lemmon Survey	·	1.8 km	MPC · JPL
724914	2008 RS_{157}	—	August 24, 2008	Kitt Peak	Spacewatch	·	1.6 km	MPC · JPL
724915	2008 RP_{161}	—	September 6, 2008	Mount Lemmon	Mount Lemmon Survey	LIX	2.8 km	MPC · JPL
724916	2008 RR_{161}	—	September 5, 2008	Kitt Peak	Spacewatch	L4 · ERY	8.4 km	MPC · JPL
724917	2008 RJ_{162}	—	September 5, 2008	Kitt Peak	Spacewatch	·	1.1 km	MPC · JPL
724918	2008 RR_{162}	—	September 7, 2008	Mount Lemmon	Mount Lemmon Survey	MAR	840 m	MPC · JPL
724919	2008 RJ_{165}	—	September 7, 2008	Mount Lemmon	Mount Lemmon Survey	·	2.3 km	MPC · JPL
724920	2008 RM_{165}	—	September 10, 2008	Kitt Peak	Spacewatch	HOF	2.1 km	MPC · JPL
724921	2008 RA_{169}	—	September 6, 2008	Kitt Peak	Spacewatch	·	1.6 km	MPC · JPL
724922	2008 RE_{169}	—	September 5, 2008	Kitt Peak	Spacewatch	EOS	1.4 km	MPC · JPL
724923	2008 RJ_{171}	—	September 3, 2008	Kitt Peak	Spacewatch	·	830 m	MPC · JPL
724924	2008 RZ_{171}	—	September 3, 2008	Kitt Peak	Spacewatch	·	810 m	MPC · JPL
724925	2008 RP_{173}	—	September 6, 2008	Kitt Peak	Spacewatch	·	1.4 km	MPC · JPL
724926	2008 RV_{173}	—	September 23, 1997	Kitt Peak	Spacewatch	L4	10 km	MPC · JPL
724927	2008 RK_{174}	—	September 4, 2008	Kitt Peak	Spacewatch	L4 · ERY	6.7 km	MPC · JPL
724928	2008 RQ_{174}	—	September 7, 2008	Mount Lemmon	Mount Lemmon Survey	·	2.1 km	MPC · JPL
724929	2008 RZ_{177}	—	September 6, 2008	Mount Lemmon	Mount Lemmon Survey	·	1.5 km	MPC · JPL
724930	2008 RR_{178}	—	September 5, 2008	Kitt Peak	Spacewatch	·	500 m	MPC · JPL
724931	2008 RO_{184}	—	September 5, 2008	Kitt Peak	Spacewatch	·	2.2 km	MPC · JPL
724932 Pozniakas	2008 SE_{8}	Pozniakas	August 31, 2008	Moletai	K. Černis, Zdanavicius, J.	L4	10 km	MPC · JPL
724933	2008 SL_{15}	—	December 21, 2004	Catalina	CSS	·	3.8 km	MPC · JPL
724934	2008 SW_{16}	—	September 19, 2008	Kitt Peak	Spacewatch	AGN	830 m	MPC · JPL
724935	2008 SU_{17}	—	September 19, 2008	Kitt Peak	Spacewatch	·	1.2 km	MPC · JPL
724936	2008 ST_{22}	—	August 7, 2008	Kitt Peak	Spacewatch	·	2.3 km	MPC · JPL
724937	2008 SQ_{23}	—	May 1, 2006	Kitt Peak	Deep Ecliptic Survey	·	1.7 km	MPC · JPL
724938	2008 SU_{23}	—	September 19, 2008	Kitt Peak	Spacewatch	·	2.6 km	MPC · JPL
724939	2008 SX_{25}	—	February 25, 2007	Kitt Peak	Spacewatch	NYS	1.0 km	MPC · JPL
724940	2008 SR_{26}	—	September 6, 2008	Mount Lemmon	Mount Lemmon Survey	L4	7.7 km	MPC · JPL
724941	2008 SJ_{43}	—	September 20, 2008	Mount Lemmon	Mount Lemmon Survey	URS	2.5 km	MPC · JPL
724942	2008 SW_{43}	—	September 6, 2008	Kitt Peak	Spacewatch	·	1.2 km	MPC · JPL
724943	2008 SP_{46}	—	September 20, 2008	Kitt Peak	Spacewatch	·	1.7 km	MPC · JPL
724944	2008 SS_{83}	—	September 22, 2008	Mount Lemmon	Mount Lemmon Survey	(5)	1.0 km	MPC · JPL
724945	2008 SR_{85}	—	July 29, 2008	Mount Lemmon	Mount Lemmon Survey	·	2.1 km	MPC · JPL
724946	2008 SP_{90}	—	November 21, 2003	Socorro	LINEAR	·	2.1 km	MPC · JPL
724947	2008 SW_{93}	—	September 21, 2008	Kitt Peak	Spacewatch	·	2.4 km	MPC · JPL
724948	2008 SE_{98}	—	September 21, 2008	Kitt Peak	Spacewatch	·	2.6 km	MPC · JPL
724949	2008 SO_{100}	—	September 21, 2008	Kitt Peak	Spacewatch	·	3.1 km	MPC · JPL
724950	2008 SQ_{114}	—	September 22, 2008	Kitt Peak	Spacewatch	L4	7.2 km	MPC · JPL
724951	2008 SC_{123}	—	September 22, 2008	Mount Lemmon	Mount Lemmon Survey	·	2.6 km	MPC · JPL
724952	2008 SY_{125}	—	September 22, 2008	Mount Lemmon	Mount Lemmon Survey	·	1.2 km	MPC · JPL
724953	2008 SJ_{170}	—	September 21, 2008	Mount Lemmon	Mount Lemmon Survey	·	1.8 km	MPC · JPL
724954	2008 SX_{170}	—	September 21, 2008	Mount Lemmon	Mount Lemmon Survey	·	1.1 km	MPC · JPL
724955	2008 SY_{174}	—	September 23, 2008	Kitt Peak	Spacewatch	·	2.0 km	MPC · JPL
724956	2008 SC_{178}	—	September 23, 2008	Kitt Peak	Spacewatch	·	1.8 km	MPC · JPL
724957	2008 SU_{184}	—	September 24, 2008	Kitt Peak	Spacewatch	·	1.3 km	MPC · JPL
724958	2008 SK_{185}	—	March 11, 2005	Mount Lemmon	Mount Lemmon Survey	(43176)	2.5 km	MPC · JPL
724959	2008 SZ_{192}	—	September 25, 2008	Kitt Peak	Spacewatch	·	3.1 km	MPC · JPL
724960	2008 SQ_{198}	—	September 25, 2008	Bergisch Gladbach	W. Bickel	·	2.4 km	MPC · JPL
724961	2008 SC_{199}	—	April 14, 2007	Mount Lemmon	Mount Lemmon Survey	·	1.4 km	MPC · JPL
724962	2008 SX_{210}	—	September 6, 2008	Mount Lemmon	Mount Lemmon Survey	·	2.4 km	MPC · JPL
724963	2008 SG_{211}	—	October 13, 2004	Vail-Jarnac	Jarnac	·	1.7 km	MPC · JPL
724964	2008 SJ_{212}	—	September 29, 2008	Mount Lemmon	Mount Lemmon Survey	·	2.3 km	MPC · JPL
724965	2008 SJ_{213}	—	September 19, 2008	Kitt Peak	Spacewatch	ELF	2.8 km	MPC · JPL
724966	2008 ST_{216}	—	September 11, 2008	Bergisch Gladbach	W. Bickel	·	1.0 km	MPC · JPL
724967	2008 SG_{217}	—	September 29, 2008	Mount Lemmon	Mount Lemmon Survey	·	1.4 km	MPC · JPL
724968	2008 SA_{226}	—	September 26, 2008	Kitt Peak	Spacewatch	·	2.2 km	MPC · JPL
724969	2008 SN_{226}	—	March 23, 2006	Catalina	CSS	·	2.2 km	MPC · JPL
724970	2008 SH_{230}	—	September 28, 2008	Mount Lemmon	Mount Lemmon Survey	·	2.3 km	MPC · JPL
724971	2008 SQ_{239}	—	September 2, 2008	Kitt Peak	Spacewatch	·	1.6 km	MPC · JPL
724972	2008 ST_{241}	—	September 29, 2008	Catalina	CSS	·	2.4 km	MPC · JPL
724973	2008 SM_{263}	—	September 24, 2008	Kitt Peak	Spacewatch	·	2.2 km	MPC · JPL
724974	2008 ST_{263}	—	March 25, 2006	Kitt Peak	Spacewatch	·	3.1 km	MPC · JPL
724975	2008 SL_{266}	—	September 30, 2008	Mount Lemmon	Mount Lemmon Survey	·	2.4 km	MPC · JPL
724976	2008 SZ_{270}	—	September 25, 2008	Kitt Peak	Spacewatch	·	2.4 km	MPC · JPL
724977	2008 SO_{271}	—	September 29, 2008	Kitt Peak	Spacewatch	·	1.9 km	MPC · JPL
724978	2008 SD_{279}	—	September 29, 2008	Mount Lemmon	Mount Lemmon Survey	EOS	1.5 km	MPC · JPL
724979	2008 SC_{281}	—	September 27, 2008	Mount Lemmon	Mount Lemmon Survey	·	900 m	MPC · JPL
724980	2008 SN_{283}	—	September 22, 2008	Mount Lemmon	Mount Lemmon Survey	TIR	2.4 km	MPC · JPL
724981	2008 SA_{311}	—	September 18, 2003	Kitt Peak	Spacewatch	·	1.5 km	MPC · JPL
724982	2008 SC_{314}	—	September 27, 2008	Mount Lemmon	Mount Lemmon Survey	·	1.3 km	MPC · JPL
724983	2008 SF_{314}	—	November 28, 2010	Kitt Peak	Spacewatch	3:2	5.0 km	MPC · JPL
724984	2008 SB_{315}	—	September 28, 2008	Mount Lemmon	Mount Lemmon Survey	·	1.9 km	MPC · JPL
724985	2008 SK_{315}	—	September 3, 2016	Mount Lemmon	Mount Lemmon Survey	·	1.5 km	MPC · JPL
724986	2008 SD_{316}	—	September 27, 2008	Mount Lemmon	Mount Lemmon Survey	·	3.4 km	MPC · JPL
724987	2008 SK_{316}	—	January 27, 2010	WISE	WISE	·	2.9 km	MPC · JPL
724988	2008 SL_{316}	—	September 23, 2008	Kitt Peak	Spacewatch	·	3.2 km	MPC · JPL
724989	2008 SS_{316}	—	September 3, 2008	Kitt Peak	Spacewatch	·	2.5 km	MPC · JPL
724990	2008 SG_{317}	—	July 16, 2013	Haleakala	Pan-STARRS 1	·	3.6 km	MPC · JPL
724991	2008 ST_{317}	—	September 23, 2008	Mount Lemmon	Mount Lemmon Survey	·	2.2 km	MPC · JPL
724992	2008 SV_{317}	—	September 24, 2008	Mount Lemmon	Mount Lemmon Survey	EOS	1.7 km	MPC · JPL
724993	2008 SW_{317}	—	August 4, 2013	Haleakala	Pan-STARRS 1	·	1.8 km	MPC · JPL
724994	2008 SY_{317}	—	February 5, 2011	Haleakala	Pan-STARRS 1	·	2.1 km	MPC · JPL
724995	2008 SZ_{317}	—	September 6, 2008	Kitt Peak	Spacewatch	L4	6.3 km	MPC · JPL
724996	2008 SC_{321}	—	March 2, 2011	Kitt Peak	Spacewatch	·	1.3 km	MPC · JPL
724997	2008 SW_{321}	—	September 23, 2008	Mount Lemmon	Mount Lemmon Survey	·	3.4 km	MPC · JPL
724998	2008 SC_{324}	—	September 23, 2008	Kitt Peak	Spacewatch	·	2.0 km	MPC · JPL
724999	2008 SJ_{324}	—	September 24, 2008	Mount Lemmon	Mount Lemmon Survey	EOS	1.5 km	MPC · JPL
725000	2008 SX_{324}	—	September 23, 2008	Kitt Peak	Spacewatch	·	2.1 km	MPC · JPL

back to top

== Meaning of names ==
As minor planet discoveries are confirmed, they are given a permanent number by the IAU's Minor Planet Center (MPC), and the discoverers can then submit names for them, following the IAU's naming conventions. The list below concerns those minor planets in the specified number-range that have received names, and explains the meanings of those names.

Official naming citations of newly named small Solar System bodies are approved and published in a bulletin by IAU's Working Group for Small Bodies Nomenclature (WGSBN). Before May 2021, citations were published in MPC's Minor Planet Circulars for many decades. Recent citations can also be found on the JPL Small-Body Database (SBDB). Until his death in 2016, German astronomer Lutz D. Schmadel compiled these citations into the Dictionary of Minor Planet Names (DMP) and regularly updated the collection.

Based on Paul Herget's The Names of the Minor Planets, Schmadel also researched the unclear origin of numerous asteroids, most of which had been named prior to World War II. This article incorporates text from this source, which is in the public domain: SBDB New namings may only be added to this list below after official publication as the preannouncement of names is condemned. The WGSBN publishes a comprehensive guideline for the naming rules of non-cometary small Solar System bodies.

Named minor planet	Provisional	This minor planet was named for...	Ref · Catalog
724427 Sorinhotea	2007 YY_{86}	Sorin Hotea (b. 1982), a Romanian informatics teacher and amateur astronomer from Sighetu Marmaţiei.	IAU · 724427
724547 Süßenberger	2008 CE_{177}	Uwe Süßenberger, German amateur astronomer.	IAU · 724547
724666 Unda-Sanzana	2008 EX_{169}	Eduardo Unda-Sanzana (born 1974), Chilean astronomer and professor of the Universidad de Antofagasta, Chile, and long-term EURONEAR member.	IAU · 724666
724875 Hengchun	2008 QK_{33}	Hengchun Township, in Pingtung County, southern Taiwan.	IAU · 724875
724932 Pozniakas	2008 SE_{8}	Danas Pozniakas, Lithuanian heavyweight boxer and Olympic champion.	IAU · 724932
