= List of minor planets: 358001–359000 =

The following is a partial list of minor planets, running from minor-planet number 358001 through 359000, inclusive. The primary data for this and other partial lists is based on JPL's "Small-Body Orbital Elements" and data available from the Minor Planet Center. Critical list information is also provided by the MPC, unless otherwise specified from Lowell Observatory. A detailed description of the table's columns and additional sources are given on the main page including a complete list of every page in this series, and a statistical break-up on the dynamical classification of minor planets.

Also see the summary list of all named bodies in numerical and alphabetical order, and the corresponding naming citations for the number range of this particular list. New namings may only be added to this list after official publication, as the preannouncement of names is condemned by the Working Group for Small Bodies Nomenclature of the International Astronomical Union.

| Near-Earth obj. | MBA (inner) | MBA (outer) | Centaur |
| Mars-crosser | MBA (middle) | Jupiter trojan | Trans-Neptunian obj. |
| Unclassified |

== 358001–358100 ==
| Designation | | | Discovery | | | Properties | | Ref |
| Permanent | Provisional | Named after | Date | Site | Discoverer(s) | Category | Diam. | Ref |
|---|---|---|---|---|---|---|---|---|
| 358001 | 2006 DD_{69} | — | February 20, 2006 | Socorro | LINEAR | · | 1.0 km | MPC · JPL |
| 358002 | 2006 DW_{69} | — | February 20, 2006 | Mount Lemmon | Mount Lemmon Survey | · | 890 m | MPC · JPL |
| 358003 | 2006 DX_{72} | — | February 22, 2006 | Kitt Peak | Spacewatch | · | 750 m | MPC · JPL |
| 358004 | 2006 DR_{73} | — | February 23, 2006 | Kitt Peak | Spacewatch | · | 700 m | MPC · JPL |
| 358005 | 2006 DT_{78} | — | February 24, 2006 | Kitt Peak | Spacewatch | · | 1.1 km | MPC · JPL |
| 358006 | 2006 DZ_{80} | — | February 24, 2006 | Kitt Peak | Spacewatch | ERI | 1.2 km | MPC · JPL |
| 358007 | 2006 DM_{92} | — | February 24, 2006 | Kitt Peak | Spacewatch | · | 1.1 km | MPC · JPL |
| 358008 | 2006 DG_{97} | — | February 24, 2006 | Kitt Peak | Spacewatch | · | 890 m | MPC · JPL |
| 358009 | 2006 DG_{107} | — | February 25, 2006 | Mount Lemmon | Mount Lemmon Survey | · | 930 m | MPC · JPL |
| 358010 | 2006 DW_{107} | — | February 25, 2006 | Kitt Peak | Spacewatch | NYS | 1.1 km | MPC · JPL |
| 358011 | 2006 DW_{115} | — | February 27, 2006 | Kitt Peak | Spacewatch | · | 2.0 km | MPC · JPL |
| 358012 | 2006 DO_{128} | — | January 23, 2006 | Kitt Peak | Spacewatch | · | 870 m | MPC · JPL |
| 358013 | 2006 DR_{137} | — | February 25, 2006 | Kitt Peak | Spacewatch | · | 660 m | MPC · JPL |
| 358014 | 2006 DC_{144} | — | February 25, 2006 | Mount Lemmon | Mount Lemmon Survey | · | 760 m | MPC · JPL |
| 358015 | 2006 DD_{155} | — | February 25, 2006 | Kitt Peak | Spacewatch | · | 1.0 km | MPC · JPL |
| 358016 | 2006 DV_{164} | — | February 27, 2006 | Kitt Peak | Spacewatch | NYS | 1.0 km | MPC · JPL |
| 358017 | 2006 DP_{171} | — | February 27, 2006 | Kitt Peak | Spacewatch | · | 890 m | MPC · JPL |
| 358018 | 2006 DH_{174} | — | February 27, 2006 | Kitt Peak | Spacewatch | · | 910 m | MPC · JPL |
| 358019 | 2006 DE_{176} | — | February 27, 2006 | Mount Lemmon | Mount Lemmon Survey | · | 890 m | MPC · JPL |
| 358020 | 2006 DC_{185} | — | February 27, 2006 | Mount Lemmon | Mount Lemmon Survey | · | 1.1 km | MPC · JPL |
| 358021 | 2006 DX_{191} | — | January 5, 2006 | Mount Lemmon | Mount Lemmon Survey | · | 1.3 km | MPC · JPL |
| 358022 | 2006 DR_{207} | — | February 25, 2006 | Mount Lemmon | Mount Lemmon Survey | · | 1.5 km | MPC · JPL |
| 358023 | 2006 DL_{211} | — | January 31, 2006 | Mount Lemmon | Mount Lemmon Survey | · | 770 m | MPC · JPL |
| 358024 | 2006 EZ_{4} | — | March 2, 2006 | Kitt Peak | Spacewatch | · | 780 m | MPC · JPL |
| 358025 | 2006 EH_{58} | — | March 5, 2006 | Kitt Peak | Spacewatch | · | 1.2 km | MPC · JPL |
| 358026 | 2006 EU_{62} | — | March 5, 2006 | Kitt Peak | Spacewatch | · | 940 m | MPC · JPL |
| 358027 | 2006 ED_{67} | — | January 26, 2006 | Mount Lemmon | Mount Lemmon Survey | · | 860 m | MPC · JPL |
| 358028 | 2006 FX_{7} | — | March 23, 2006 | Kitt Peak | Spacewatch | · | 1.5 km | MPC · JPL |
| 358029 | 2006 FV_{9} | — | March 2, 1995 | Kitt Peak | Spacewatch | NYS | 940 m | MPC · JPL |
| 358030 | 2006 FU_{12} | — | March 23, 2006 | Kitt Peak | Spacewatch | · | 1.1 km | MPC · JPL |
| 358031 | 2006 FJ_{13} | — | March 23, 2006 | Kitt Peak | Spacewatch | 3:2 · SHU | 5.1 km | MPC · JPL |
| 358032 | 2006 FB_{18} | — | March 23, 2006 | Kitt Peak | Spacewatch | · | 860 m | MPC · JPL |
| 358033 | 2006 FD_{25} | — | March 24, 2006 | Kitt Peak | Spacewatch | · | 970 m | MPC · JPL |
| 358034 | 2006 FA_{28} | — | March 24, 2006 | Mount Lemmon | Mount Lemmon Survey | NYS | 850 m | MPC · JPL |
| 358035 | 2006 FS_{34} | — | March 24, 2006 | Catalina | CSS | · | 1.4 km | MPC · JPL |
| 358036 | 2006 FF_{37} | — | March 24, 2006 | Socorro | LINEAR | · | 1.1 km | MPC · JPL |
| 358037 | 2006 FU_{52} | — | March 23, 2006 | Kitt Peak | Spacewatch | · | 960 m | MPC · JPL |
| 358038 | 2006 GL_{6} | — | April 2, 2006 | Kitt Peak | Spacewatch | PHO | 1.3 km | MPC · JPL |
| 358039 | 2006 GA_{21} | — | April 2, 2006 | Kitt Peak | Spacewatch | V | 800 m | MPC · JPL |
| 358040 | 2006 GE_{21} | — | April 2, 2006 | Kitt Peak | Spacewatch | · | 1.4 km | MPC · JPL |
| 358041 | 2006 GU_{22} | — | April 2, 2006 | Kitt Peak | Spacewatch | NYS | 760 m | MPC · JPL |
| 358042 | 2006 GZ_{24} | — | April 2, 2006 | Kitt Peak | Spacewatch | · | 730 m | MPC · JPL |
| 358043 | 2006 GF_{29} | — | April 2, 2006 | Kitt Peak | Spacewatch | MAS | 760 m | MPC · JPL |
| 358044 | 2006 GB_{30} | — | April 2, 2006 | Mount Lemmon | Mount Lemmon Survey | V | 670 m | MPC · JPL |
| 358045 | 2006 GL_{35} | — | April 7, 2006 | Catalina | CSS | PHO | 1.3 km | MPC · JPL |
| 358046 | 2006 GR_{35} | — | April 7, 2006 | Catalina | CSS | · | 1.0 km | MPC · JPL |
| 358047 | 2006 GM_{39} | — | April 2, 2006 | Catalina | CSS | PHO | 1.6 km | MPC · JPL |
| 358048 | 2006 GB_{46} | — | April 8, 2006 | Kitt Peak | Spacewatch | · | 2.2 km | MPC · JPL |
| 358049 | 2006 HZ_{12} | — | April 19, 2006 | Kitt Peak | Spacewatch | · | 1.2 km | MPC · JPL |
| 358050 | 2006 HT_{17} | — | April 20, 2006 | Kitt Peak | Spacewatch | · | 1.4 km | MPC · JPL |
| 358051 | 2006 HD_{19} | — | April 18, 2006 | Kitt Peak | Spacewatch | · | 2.3 km | MPC · JPL |
| 358052 | 2006 HV_{19} | — | April 19, 2006 | Mount Lemmon | Mount Lemmon Survey | · | 890 m | MPC · JPL |
| 358053 | 2006 HL_{22} | — | April 20, 2006 | Kitt Peak | Spacewatch | NYS | 1.3 km | MPC · JPL |
| 358054 | 2006 HR_{22} | — | April 20, 2006 | Kitt Peak | Spacewatch | NYS | 1.2 km | MPC · JPL |
| 358055 | 2006 HO_{25} | — | April 20, 2006 | Kitt Peak | Spacewatch | · | 1.3 km | MPC · JPL |
| 358056 | 2006 HA_{28} | — | April 20, 2006 | Kitt Peak | Spacewatch | V | 820 m | MPC · JPL |
| 358057 | 2006 HQ_{32} | — | April 19, 2006 | Mount Lemmon | Mount Lemmon Survey | · | 780 m | MPC · JPL |
| 358058 | 2006 HZ_{35} | — | April 20, 2006 | Kitt Peak | Spacewatch | · | 970 m | MPC · JPL |
| 358059 | 2006 HE_{43} | — | April 24, 2006 | Mount Lemmon | Mount Lemmon Survey | MAS | 610 m | MPC · JPL |
| 358060 | 2006 HR_{49} | — | April 25, 2006 | Socorro | LINEAR | · | 770 m | MPC · JPL |
| 358061 | 2006 HA_{63} | — | April 24, 2006 | Kitt Peak | Spacewatch | NYS | 940 m | MPC · JPL |
| 358062 | 2006 HS_{66} | — | April 2, 2006 | Kitt Peak | Spacewatch | NYS | 1.4 km | MPC · JPL |
| 358063 | 2006 HE_{67} | — | April 24, 2006 | Kitt Peak | Spacewatch | · | 1.1 km | MPC · JPL |
| 358064 | 2006 HP_{70} | — | April 25, 2006 | Kitt Peak | Spacewatch | · | 740 m | MPC · JPL |
| 358065 | 2006 HH_{78} | — | March 25, 2006 | Kitt Peak | Spacewatch | · | 1.2 km | MPC · JPL |
| 358066 | 2006 HV_{80} | — | April 26, 2006 | Kitt Peak | Spacewatch | · | 1.0 km | MPC · JPL |
| 358067 | 2006 HO_{81} | — | April 26, 2006 | Kitt Peak | Spacewatch | · | 1.8 km | MPC · JPL |
| 358068 | 2006 HY_{84} | — | April 26, 2006 | Kitt Peak | Spacewatch | · | 1.3 km | MPC · JPL |
| 358069 | 2006 HA_{89} | — | April 8, 2006 | Catalina | CSS | · | 1.2 km | MPC · JPL |
| 358070 | 2006 HY_{98} | — | April 30, 2006 | Kitt Peak | Spacewatch | DOR | 2.5 km | MPC · JPL |
| 358071 | 2006 HB_{105} | — | April 21, 2006 | Catalina | CSS | PHO | 970 m | MPC · JPL |
| 358072 | 2006 HF_{107} | — | April 30, 2006 | Kitt Peak | Spacewatch | V | 830 m | MPC · JPL |
| 358073 | 2006 HJ_{107} | — | April 30, 2006 | Kitt Peak | Spacewatch | · | 1.1 km | MPC · JPL |
| 358074 | 2006 HD_{112} | — | April 8, 2006 | Kitt Peak | Spacewatch | · | 1.2 km | MPC · JPL |
| 358075 | 2006 JR_{3} | — | May 2, 2006 | Kitt Peak | Spacewatch | · | 960 m | MPC · JPL |
| 358076 | 2006 JA_{4} | — | May 2, 2006 | Mount Lemmon | Mount Lemmon Survey | V | 670 m | MPC · JPL |
| 358077 | 2006 JM_{5} | — | May 3, 2006 | Mount Lemmon | Mount Lemmon Survey | MAS | 850 m | MPC · JPL |
| 358078 | 2006 JQ_{7} | — | May 1, 2006 | Kitt Peak | Spacewatch | MAS | 850 m | MPC · JPL |
| 358079 | 2006 JE_{10} | — | May 1, 2006 | Kitt Peak | Spacewatch | NYS | 1.1 km | MPC · JPL |
| 358080 | 2006 JW_{11} | — | May 1, 2006 | Kitt Peak | Spacewatch | · | 1.2 km | MPC · JPL |
| 358081 | 2006 JG_{16} | — | May 2, 2006 | Mount Lemmon | Mount Lemmon Survey | MAS | 680 m | MPC · JPL |
| 358082 | 2006 JG_{18} | — | May 2, 2006 | Mount Lemmon | Mount Lemmon Survey | V | 590 m | MPC · JPL |
| 358083 | 2006 JW_{19} | — | May 2, 2006 | Kitt Peak | Spacewatch | · | 1.2 km | MPC · JPL |
| 358084 | 2006 JD_{26} | — | May 3, 2006 | Reedy Creek | J. Broughton | · | 1.6 km | MPC · JPL |
| 358085 | 2006 JG_{26} | — | May 3, 2006 | Reedy Creek | J. Broughton | V | 900 m | MPC · JPL |
| 358086 | 2006 JT_{29} | — | May 3, 2006 | Kitt Peak | Spacewatch | · | 1.3 km | MPC · JPL |
| 358087 | 2006 JA_{30} | — | May 3, 2006 | Kitt Peak | Spacewatch | · | 1.2 km | MPC · JPL |
| 358088 | 2006 JX_{31} | — | May 3, 2006 | Kitt Peak | Spacewatch | · | 1.4 km | MPC · JPL |
| 358089 | 2006 JE_{44} | — | February 7, 2002 | Kitt Peak | Spacewatch | · | 810 m | MPC · JPL |
| 358090 | 2006 JD_{50} | — | May 2, 2006 | Mount Lemmon | Mount Lemmon Survey | · | 1.8 km | MPC · JPL |
| 358091 | 2006 JH_{59} | — | May 1, 2006 | Kitt Peak | M. W. Buie | MAS | 700 m | MPC · JPL |
| 358092 | 2006 JF_{80} | — | May 9, 2006 | Mount Lemmon | Mount Lemmon Survey | · | 1.5 km | MPC · JPL |
| 358093 | 2006 KQ_{3} | — | May 19, 2006 | Mount Lemmon | Mount Lemmon Survey | · | 1.0 km | MPC · JPL |
| 358094 | 2006 KU_{3} | — | May 19, 2006 | Mount Lemmon | Mount Lemmon Survey | · | 1.8 km | MPC · JPL |
| 358095 | 2006 KG_{9} | — | May 19, 2006 | Mount Lemmon | Mount Lemmon Survey | · | 1.1 km | MPC · JPL |
| 358096 | 2006 KN_{19} | — | May 22, 2006 | Mount Lemmon | Mount Lemmon Survey | · | 940 m | MPC · JPL |
| 358097 | 2006 KQ_{20} | — | May 21, 2006 | Catalina | CSS | PHO | 1.3 km | MPC · JPL |
| 358098 | 2006 KL_{25} | — | May 19, 2006 | Mount Lemmon | Mount Lemmon Survey | · | 1.3 km | MPC · JPL |
| 358099 | 2006 KH_{40} | — | May 18, 2006 | Palomar | NEAT | NYS | 1.5 km | MPC · JPL |
| 358100 | 2006 KD_{42} | — | May 20, 2006 | Kitt Peak | Spacewatch | · | 800 m | MPC · JPL |

== 358101–358200 ==
back to top

| Designation | | | Discovery | | | Properties | | Ref |
| Permanent | Provisional | Named after | Date | Site | Discoverer(s) | Category | Diam. | Ref |
|---|---|---|---|---|---|---|---|---|
| 358101 | 2006 KO_{50} | — | May 21, 2006 | Kitt Peak | Spacewatch | MAS | 690 m | MPC · JPL |
| 358102 | 2006 KF_{63} | — | May 23, 2006 | Mount Lemmon | Mount Lemmon Survey | · | 1.2 km | MPC · JPL |
| 358103 | 2006 KL_{81} | — | February 13, 2002 | Apache Point | SDSS | NYS | 1.1 km | MPC · JPL |
| 358104 | 2006 KR_{86} | — | May 26, 2006 | Socorro | LINEAR | PHO | 1.0 km | MPC · JPL |
| 358105 | 2006 KT_{90} | — | May 24, 2006 | Mount Lemmon | Mount Lemmon Survey | · | 1.3 km | MPC · JPL |
| 358106 | 2006 KA_{97} | — | May 25, 2006 | Kitt Peak | Spacewatch | · | 1.5 km | MPC · JPL |
| 358107 | 2006 KH_{106} | — | May 31, 2006 | Mount Lemmon | Mount Lemmon Survey | · | 1.1 km | MPC · JPL |
| 358108 | 2006 KF_{115} | — | May 29, 2006 | Kitt Peak | Spacewatch | · | 1.1 km | MPC · JPL |
| 358109 | 2006 KZ_{123} | — | May 30, 2006 | Siding Spring | SSS | · | 2.7 km | MPC · JPL |
| 358110 | 2006 OF | — | July 16, 2006 | Needville | J. Dellinger | · | 1.2 km | MPC · JPL |
| 358111 | 2006 OV_{6} | — | July 21, 2006 | Mount Lemmon | Mount Lemmon Survey | · | 1.7 km | MPC · JPL |
| 358112 | 2006 OH_{13} | — | July 21, 2006 | Catalina | CSS | · | 2.1 km | MPC · JPL |
| 358113 | 2006 OP_{20} | — | July 18, 2006 | Siding Spring | SSS | EUN | 1.3 km | MPC · JPL |
| 358114 | 2006 PM_{4} | — | August 12, 2006 | Palomar | NEAT | · | 1.7 km | MPC · JPL |
| 358115 | 2006 PO_{11} | — | August 13, 2006 | Palomar | NEAT | · | 2.0 km | MPC · JPL |
| 358116 | 2006 PZ_{12} | — | August 14, 2006 | Siding Spring | SSS | · | 1.7 km | MPC · JPL |
| 358117 | 2006 PC_{15} | — | August 15, 2006 | Palomar | NEAT | H | 640 m | MPC · JPL |
| 358118 | 2006 PX_{19} | — | August 13, 2006 | Palomar | NEAT | · | 1.9 km | MPC · JPL |
| 358119 | 2006 PN_{20} | — | August 15, 2006 | Palomar | NEAT | · | 1.9 km | MPC · JPL |
| 358120 | 2006 PK_{25} | — | August 13, 2006 | Palomar | NEAT | · | 2.8 km | MPC · JPL |
| 358121 | 2006 PD_{26} | — | August 15, 2006 | Palomar | NEAT | MAS | 1.1 km | MPC · JPL |
| 358122 | 2006 PQ_{29} | — | August 12, 2006 | Palomar | NEAT | · | 930 m | MPC · JPL |
| 358123 | 2006 PD_{36} | — | August 12, 2006 | Palomar | NEAT | · | 1.4 km | MPC · JPL |
| 358124 | 2006 PE_{41} | — | August 14, 2006 | Palomar | NEAT | · | 2.3 km | MPC · JPL |
| 358125 | 2006 QT_{20} | — | August 18, 2006 | Anderson Mesa | LONEOS | · | 2.0 km | MPC · JPL |
| 358126 | 2006 QB_{32} | — | August 18, 2006 | Anderson Mesa | LONEOS | · | 1.7 km | MPC · JPL |
| 358127 | 2006 QS_{32} | — | August 22, 2006 | Palomar | NEAT | · | 2.3 km | MPC · JPL |
| 358128 | 2006 QM_{53} | — | August 24, 2006 | Palomar | NEAT | · | 2.3 km | MPC · JPL |
| 358129 | 2006 QJ_{54} | — | August 16, 2006 | Siding Spring | SSS | · | 1.9 km | MPC · JPL |
| 358130 | 2006 QP_{83} | — | August 27, 2006 | Kitt Peak | Spacewatch | · | 1.5 km | MPC · JPL |
| 358131 | 2006 QQ_{111} | — | August 21, 2006 | Kitt Peak | Spacewatch | · | 3.0 km | MPC · JPL |
| 358132 | 2006 QC_{121} | — | August 29, 2006 | Catalina | CSS | DOR | 3.3 km | MPC · JPL |
| 358133 | 2006 QN_{121} | — | August 29, 2006 | Catalina | CSS | · | 2.0 km | MPC · JPL |
| 358134 | 2006 QU_{126} | — | August 16, 2006 | Palomar | NEAT | · | 3.2 km | MPC · JPL |
| 358135 | 2006 QC_{131} | — | August 20, 2006 | Palomar | NEAT | · | 2.1 km | MPC · JPL |
| 358136 | 2006 QP_{133} | — | August 24, 2006 | Socorro | LINEAR | · | 1.4 km | MPC · JPL |
| 358137 | 2006 QV_{133} | — | August 24, 2006 | Socorro | LINEAR | · | 1.6 km | MPC · JPL |
| 358138 | 2006 QP_{142} | — | August 29, 2006 | Anderson Mesa | LONEOS | H | 780 m | MPC · JPL |
| 358139 | 2006 QZ_{145} | — | August 18, 2006 | Kitt Peak | Spacewatch | · | 1.8 km | MPC · JPL |
| 358140 | 2006 QA_{148} | — | August 18, 2006 | Kitt Peak | Spacewatch | · | 2.0 km | MPC · JPL |
| 358141 | 2006 QZ_{179} | — | August 23, 2006 | Cerro Tololo | M. W. Buie | · | 1.7 km | MPC · JPL |
| 358142 | 2006 QK_{182} | — | August 28, 2006 | Apache Point | A. C. Becker | · | 1.1 km | MPC · JPL |
| 358143 | 2006 QZ_{183} | — | August 18, 2006 | Kitt Peak | Spacewatch | · | 1.9 km | MPC · JPL |
| 358144 | 2006 QH_{185} | — | August 28, 2006 | Kitt Peak | Spacewatch | · | 1.8 km | MPC · JPL |
| 358145 | 2006 RU_{8} | — | September 12, 2006 | Catalina | CSS | HNS | 1.5 km | MPC · JPL |
| 358146 | 2006 RA_{13} | — | September 14, 2006 | Kitt Peak | Spacewatch | EUN | 1.4 km | MPC · JPL |
| 358147 | 2006 RB_{17} | — | September 14, 2006 | Palomar | NEAT | · | 1.9 km | MPC · JPL |
| 358148 | 2006 RJ_{40} | — | September 13, 2006 | Palomar | NEAT | · | 2.1 km | MPC · JPL |
| 358149 | 2006 RO_{43} | — | September 14, 2006 | Kitt Peak | Spacewatch | · | 1.6 km | MPC · JPL |
| 358150 | 2006 RS_{44} | — | September 14, 2006 | Kitt Peak | Spacewatch | · | 2.1 km | MPC · JPL |
| 358151 | 2006 RE_{52} | — | September 14, 2006 | Kitt Peak | Spacewatch | · | 2.5 km | MPC · JPL |
| 358152 | 2006 RH_{54} | — | September 14, 2006 | Kitt Peak | Spacewatch | · | 1.8 km | MPC · JPL |
| 358153 | 2006 RN_{55} | — | September 14, 2006 | Kitt Peak | Spacewatch | · | 1.7 km | MPC · JPL |
| 358154 | 2006 RT_{66} | — | September 14, 2006 | Kitt Peak | Spacewatch | EUN | 1.5 km | MPC · JPL |
| 358155 | 2006 RF_{72} | — | September 15, 2006 | Kitt Peak | Spacewatch | · | 2.3 km | MPC · JPL |
| 358156 | 2006 RT_{74} | — | June 5, 2005 | Kitt Peak | Spacewatch | EUN | 1.1 km | MPC · JPL |
| 358157 | 2006 RR_{75} | — | September 15, 2006 | Kitt Peak | Spacewatch | · | 1.7 km | MPC · JPL |
| 358158 | 2006 RE_{80} | — | September 15, 2006 | Kitt Peak | Spacewatch | · | 1.7 km | MPC · JPL |
| 358159 | 2006 RX_{85} | — | September 15, 2006 | Kitt Peak | Spacewatch | · | 2.2 km | MPC · JPL |
| 358160 | 2006 RD_{86} | — | September 15, 2006 | Kitt Peak | Spacewatch | · | 1.5 km | MPC · JPL |
| 358161 | 2006 RR_{90} | — | September 15, 2006 | Kitt Peak | Spacewatch | (12739) | 1.8 km | MPC · JPL |
| 358162 | 2006 RZ_{92} | — | September 15, 2006 | Kitt Peak | Spacewatch | · | 1.7 km | MPC · JPL |
| 358163 | 2006 RY_{93} | — | September 15, 2006 | Kitt Peak | Spacewatch | · | 1.4 km | MPC · JPL |
| 358164 | 2006 RN_{95} | — | September 15, 2006 | Kitt Peak | Spacewatch | · | 3.0 km | MPC · JPL |
| 358165 | 2006 RX_{103} | — | September 11, 2006 | Apache Point | A. C. Becker | · | 2.1 km | MPC · JPL |
| 358166 | 2006 RW_{112} | — | April 9, 1999 | Kitt Peak | Spacewatch | · | 1.4 km | MPC · JPL |
| 358167 Barbaralong | 2006 RK_{119} | Barbaralong | September 14, 2006 | Mauna Kea | J. Masiero, R. Jedicke | · | 1.7 km | MPC · JPL |
| 358168 | 2006 SS_{12} | — | September 16, 2006 | Palomar | NEAT | H | 620 m | MPC · JPL |
| 358169 | 2006 SD_{14} | — | September 17, 2006 | Socorro | LINEAR | H | 560 m | MPC · JPL |
| 358170 | 2006 SH_{37} | — | September 17, 2006 | Kitt Peak | Spacewatch | HOF | 2.4 km | MPC · JPL |
| 358171 | 2006 SO_{41} | — | September 18, 2006 | Kitt Peak | Spacewatch | · | 960 m | MPC · JPL |
| 358172 | 2006 SL_{56} | — | September 19, 2006 | Catalina | CSS | H | 830 m | MPC · JPL |
| 358173 | 2006 SL_{57} | — | September 18, 2006 | Kitt Peak | Spacewatch | · | 1.9 km | MPC · JPL |
| 358174 | 2006 SR_{57} | — | September 20, 2006 | Črni Vrh | J. Skvarč, B. Dintinjana | JUN | 1.6 km | MPC · JPL |
| 358175 | 2006 SD_{62} | — | September 18, 2006 | Catalina | CSS | H | 620 m | MPC · JPL |
| 358176 | 2006 SA_{68} | — | September 19, 2006 | Kitt Peak | Spacewatch | MRX | 1.1 km | MPC · JPL |
| 358177 | 2006 SY_{68} | — | September 19, 2006 | Kitt Peak | Spacewatch | · | 1.8 km | MPC · JPL |
| 358178 | 2006 SQ_{69} | — | September 19, 2006 | Catalina | CSS | · | 1.1 km | MPC · JPL |
| 358179 Szegőkároly | 2006 SZ_{77} | Szegőkároly | September 23, 2006 | Piszkéstető | K. Sárneczky, Kuli, Z. | · | 2.3 km | MPC · JPL |
| 358180 | 2006 ST_{78} | — | September 16, 2006 | Catalina | CSS | · | 2.5 km | MPC · JPL |
| 358181 | 2006 SX_{80} | — | September 18, 2006 | Kitt Peak | Spacewatch | THM | 2.2 km | MPC · JPL |
| 358182 | 2006 SQ_{81} | — | September 18, 2006 | Kitt Peak | Spacewatch | · | 2.1 km | MPC · JPL |
| 358183 | 2006 SE_{82} | — | September 18, 2006 | Kitt Peak | Spacewatch | AGN | 1.0 km | MPC · JPL |
| 358184 | 2006 SU_{85} | — | September 18, 2006 | Kitt Peak | Spacewatch | · | 1.9 km | MPC · JPL |
| 358185 | 2006 SF_{89} | — | September 18, 2006 | Kitt Peak | Spacewatch | · | 1.8 km | MPC · JPL |
| 358186 | 2006 ST_{89} | — | September 18, 2006 | Kitt Peak | Spacewatch | · | 1.9 km | MPC · JPL |
| 358187 | 2006 SR_{95} | — | September 18, 2006 | Kitt Peak | Spacewatch | · | 2.0 km | MPC · JPL |
| 358188 | 2006 SN_{96} | — | September 18, 2006 | Kitt Peak | Spacewatch | · | 1.1 km | MPC · JPL |
| 358189 | 2006 SU_{97} | — | September 18, 2006 | Kitt Peak | Spacewatch | · | 2.4 km | MPC · JPL |
| 358190 | 2006 SA_{99} | — | September 18, 2006 | Kitt Peak | Spacewatch | · | 1.9 km | MPC · JPL |
| 358191 | 2006 SE_{99} | — | September 18, 2006 | Kitt Peak | Spacewatch | PAD | 1.7 km | MPC · JPL |
| 358192 | 2006 SJ_{103} | — | September 19, 2006 | Kitt Peak | Spacewatch | · | 2.3 km | MPC · JPL |
| 358193 | 2006 SH_{104} | — | September 19, 2006 | Kitt Peak | Spacewatch | · | 1.6 km | MPC · JPL |
| 358194 | 2006 ST_{104} | — | September 19, 2006 | Kitt Peak | Spacewatch | HOF | 2.2 km | MPC · JPL |
| 358195 | 2006 SL_{109} | — | September 19, 2006 | Kitt Peak | Spacewatch | · | 1.8 km | MPC · JPL |
| 358196 | 2006 SP_{112} | — | September 23, 2006 | Kitt Peak | Spacewatch | NEM | 2.2 km | MPC · JPL |
| 358197 | 2006 SB_{114} | — | September 23, 2006 | Kitt Peak | Spacewatch | · | 1.4 km | MPC · JPL |
| 358198 | 2006 SQ_{132} | — | September 16, 2006 | Anderson Mesa | LONEOS | · | 1.8 km | MPC · JPL |
| 358199 | 2006 SO_{139} | — | September 21, 2006 | Anderson Mesa | LONEOS | · | 3.1 km | MPC · JPL |
| 358200 | 2006 SF_{148} | — | September 19, 2006 | Catalina | CSS | (5) | 1.1 km | MPC · JPL |

== 358201–358300 ==
back to top

| Designation | | | Discovery | | | Properties | | Ref |
| Permanent | Provisional | Named after | Date | Site | Discoverer(s) | Category | Diam. | Ref |
|---|---|---|---|---|---|---|---|---|
| 358201 | 2006 SU_{153} | — | September 20, 2006 | Catalina | CSS | · | 2.5 km | MPC · JPL |
| 358202 | 2006 SL_{156} | — | September 23, 2006 | Kitt Peak | Spacewatch | · | 1.4 km | MPC · JPL |
| 358203 | 2006 SV_{160} | — | September 23, 2006 | Kitt Peak | Spacewatch | · | 1.5 km | MPC · JPL |
| 358204 | 2006 SK_{165} | — | September 25, 2006 | Kitt Peak | Spacewatch | · | 1.9 km | MPC · JPL |
| 358205 | 2006 SJ_{173} | — | September 25, 2006 | Kitt Peak | Spacewatch | WIT | 1.2 km | MPC · JPL |
| 358206 | 2006 SS_{184} | — | September 25, 2006 | Mount Lemmon | Mount Lemmon Survey | · | 1.7 km | MPC · JPL |
| 358207 | 2006 SP_{188} | — | September 26, 2006 | Kitt Peak | Spacewatch | · | 1.6 km | MPC · JPL |
| 358208 | 2006 SF_{189} | — | September 26, 2006 | Kitt Peak | Spacewatch | · | 1.4 km | MPC · JPL |
| 358209 | 2006 SM_{189} | — | September 26, 2006 | Kitt Peak | Spacewatch | · | 1.5 km | MPC · JPL |
| 358210 | 2006 SJ_{192} | — | September 26, 2006 | Mount Lemmon | Mount Lemmon Survey | · | 1.7 km | MPC · JPL |
| 358211 | 2006 SL_{199} | — | September 24, 2006 | Kitt Peak | Spacewatch | (5) | 1.3 km | MPC · JPL |
| 358212 | 2006 SX_{200} | — | September 24, 2006 | Kitt Peak | Spacewatch | · | 1.7 km | MPC · JPL |
| 358213 | 2006 SL_{206} | — | September 25, 2006 | Mount Lemmon | Mount Lemmon Survey | EUN | 1.2 km | MPC · JPL |
| 358214 | 2006 SB_{207} | — | September 25, 2006 | Kitt Peak | Spacewatch | · | 1.5 km | MPC · JPL |
| 358215 | 2006 SM_{208} | — | September 26, 2006 | Socorro | LINEAR | · | 2.1 km | MPC · JPL |
| 358216 | 2006 SR_{212} | — | September 26, 2006 | Catalina | CSS | · | 2.7 km | MPC · JPL |
| 358217 | 2006 SY_{213} | — | September 16, 2006 | Catalina | CSS | · | 4.3 km | MPC · JPL |
| 358218 | 2006 SK_{225} | — | September 26, 2006 | Kitt Peak | Spacewatch | · | 1.0 km | MPC · JPL |
| 358219 | 2006 SH_{228} | — | September 26, 2006 | Kitt Peak | Spacewatch | · | 1.8 km | MPC · JPL |
| 358220 | 2006 SM_{229} | — | September 26, 2006 | Kitt Peak | Spacewatch | AGN | 1.2 km | MPC · JPL |
| 358221 | 2006 ST_{230} | — | September 17, 2006 | Catalina | CSS | NEM | 2.2 km | MPC · JPL |
| 358222 | 2006 SA_{234} | — | September 18, 2006 | Kitt Peak | Spacewatch | · | 1.8 km | MPC · JPL |
| 358223 | 2006 SZ_{243} | — | September 26, 2006 | Kitt Peak | Spacewatch | · | 2.0 km | MPC · JPL |
| 358224 | 2006 SQ_{244} | — | September 26, 2006 | Kitt Peak | Spacewatch | · | 2.5 km | MPC · JPL |
| 358225 | 2006 SD_{255} | — | September 26, 2006 | Catalina | CSS | · | 1.9 km | MPC · JPL |
| 358226 | 2006 SM_{257} | — | September 26, 2006 | Kitt Peak | Spacewatch | · | 1.8 km | MPC · JPL |
| 358227 | 2006 SA_{258} | — | September 26, 2006 | Kitt Peak | Spacewatch | · | 2.1 km | MPC · JPL |
| 358228 | 2006 SL_{262} | — | September 26, 2006 | Mount Lemmon | Mount Lemmon Survey | · | 2.0 km | MPC · JPL |
| 358229 | 2006 SC_{265} | — | September 26, 2006 | Kitt Peak | Spacewatch | · | 2.0 km | MPC · JPL |
| 358230 | 2006 SX_{278} | — | September 28, 2006 | Kitt Peak | Spacewatch | · | 1.8 km | MPC · JPL |
| 358231 | 2006 SM_{290} | — | September 18, 2006 | Calvin-Rehoboth | L. A. Molnar | · | 1.6 km | MPC · JPL |
| 358232 | 2006 SE_{293} | — | September 25, 2006 | Kitt Peak | Spacewatch | AGN | 1.1 km | MPC · JPL |
| 358233 | 2006 SK_{302} | — | September 27, 2006 | Kitt Peak | Spacewatch | WIT | 1.1 km | MPC · JPL |
| 358234 | 2006 SO_{310} | — | September 27, 2006 | Kitt Peak | Spacewatch | · | 1.6 km | MPC · JPL |
| 358235 | 2006 SR_{326} | — | September 27, 2006 | Kitt Peak | Spacewatch | EUN | 1.2 km | MPC · JPL |
| 358236 | 2006 SV_{331} | — | September 28, 2006 | Mount Lemmon | Mount Lemmon Survey | · | 2.8 km | MPC · JPL |
| 358237 | 2006 SN_{333} | — | September 28, 2006 | Kitt Peak | Spacewatch | · | 1.4 km | MPC · JPL |
| 358238 | 2006 SD_{335} | — | September 28, 2006 | Kitt Peak | Spacewatch | · | 1.9 km | MPC · JPL |
| 358239 | 2006 SO_{335} | — | September 28, 2006 | Kitt Peak | Spacewatch | · | 2.1 km | MPC · JPL |
| 358240 | 2006 SK_{337} | — | September 28, 2006 | Kitt Peak | Spacewatch | · | 2.4 km | MPC · JPL |
| 358241 | 2006 SQ_{337} | — | September 28, 2006 | Kitt Peak | Spacewatch | AGN | 940 m | MPC · JPL |
| 358242 | 2006 SU_{341} | — | September 28, 2006 | Kitt Peak | Spacewatch | · | 1.9 km | MPC · JPL |
| 358243 | 2006 SO_{343} | — | March 21, 1999 | Apache Point | SDSS | · | 2.2 km | MPC · JPL |
| 358244 | 2006 SJ_{362} | — | September 30, 2006 | Mount Lemmon | Mount Lemmon Survey | · | 2.8 km | MPC · JPL |
| 358245 | 2006 SA_{366} | — | September 30, 2006 | Mount Lemmon | Mount Lemmon Survey | · | 1.8 km | MPC · JPL |
| 358246 | 2006 SS_{381} | — | September 28, 2006 | Apache Point | SDSS Collaboration | · | 1.7 km | MPC · JPL |
| 358247 | 2006 SD_{408} | — | September 27, 2006 | Mount Lemmon | Mount Lemmon Survey | HOF | 2.3 km | MPC · JPL |
| 358248 | 2006 SF_{413} | — | September 19, 2006 | Kitt Peak | Spacewatch | H | 650 m | MPC · JPL |
| 358249 | 2006 TZ_{5} | — | October 2, 2006 | Mount Lemmon | Mount Lemmon Survey | · | 1.6 km | MPC · JPL |
| 358250 | 2006 TU_{10} | — | October 11, 2006 | Kitt Peak | Spacewatch | · | 1.8 km | MPC · JPL |
| 358251 | 2006 TH_{21} | — | October 11, 2006 | Kitt Peak | Spacewatch | · | 2.2 km | MPC · JPL |
| 358252 | 2006 TD_{24} | — | October 12, 2006 | Palomar | NEAT | H | 560 m | MPC · JPL |
| 358253 | 2006 TO_{28} | — | October 12, 2006 | Kitt Peak | Spacewatch | · | 2.6 km | MPC · JPL |
| 358254 | 2006 TM_{33} | — | October 12, 2006 | Kitt Peak | Spacewatch | · | 1.7 km | MPC · JPL |
| 358255 | 2006 TN_{33} | — | October 4, 2006 | Mount Lemmon | Mount Lemmon Survey | · | 1.6 km | MPC · JPL |
| 358256 | 2006 TX_{33} | — | October 12, 2006 | Kitt Peak | Spacewatch | · | 2.2 km | MPC · JPL |
| 358257 | 2006 TW_{34} | — | October 12, 2006 | Kitt Peak | Spacewatch | AGN | 1.2 km | MPC · JPL |
| 358258 | 2006 TL_{36} | — | October 12, 2006 | Kitt Peak | Spacewatch | · | 5.4 km | MPC · JPL |
| 358259 | 2006 TN_{40} | — | October 12, 2006 | Kitt Peak | Spacewatch | HOF | 2.6 km | MPC · JPL |
| 358260 | 2006 TC_{45} | — | October 12, 2006 | Kitt Peak | Spacewatch | · | 2.1 km | MPC · JPL |
| 358261 | 2006 TV_{45} | — | October 12, 2006 | Kitt Peak | Spacewatch | KOR | 1.3 km | MPC · JPL |
| 358262 | 2006 TZ_{53} | — | October 12, 2006 | Kitt Peak | Spacewatch | · | 2.0 km | MPC · JPL |
| 358263 | 2006 TX_{60} | — | October 15, 2006 | Bergisch Gladbach | W. Bickel | · | 2.1 km | MPC · JPL |
| 358264 | 2006 TO_{71} | — | October 11, 2006 | Palomar | NEAT | · | 2.2 km | MPC · JPL |
| 358265 | 2006 TR_{91} | — | October 13, 2006 | Kitt Peak | Spacewatch | MAR | 1.5 km | MPC · JPL |
| 358266 | 2006 TU_{97} | — | September 27, 2006 | Mount Lemmon | Mount Lemmon Survey | MAR | 1.4 km | MPC · JPL |
| 358267 | 2006 TZ_{101} | — | October 15, 2006 | Kitt Peak | Spacewatch | · | 1.8 km | MPC · JPL |
| 358268 | 2006 TW_{106} | — | October 15, 2006 | Catalina | CSS | · | 2.4 km | MPC · JPL |
| 358269 | 2006 TL_{109} | — | October 4, 2006 | Mount Lemmon | Mount Lemmon Survey | · | 2.5 km | MPC · JPL |
| 358270 | 2006 TZ_{110} | — | October 1, 2006 | Apache Point | A. C. Becker | HOF | 2.3 km | MPC · JPL |
| 358271 | 2006 TF_{120} | — | October 12, 2006 | Apache Point | A. C. Becker | · | 1.3 km | MPC · JPL |
| 358272 | 2006 TG_{121} | — | October 12, 2006 | Apache Point | SDSS Collaboration | · | 2.4 km | MPC · JPL |
| 358273 | 2006 TR_{123} | — | October 2, 2006 | Mount Lemmon | Mount Lemmon Survey | · | 2.2 km | MPC · JPL |
| 358274 | 2006 UD_{4} | — | October 18, 2006 | Piszkéstető | K. Sárneczky | AGN | 1.2 km | MPC · JPL |
| 358275 | 2006 UY_{13} | — | October 17, 2006 | Mount Lemmon | Mount Lemmon Survey | · | 2.6 km | MPC · JPL |
| 358276 | 2006 UX_{16} | — | October 16, 2006 | Junk Bond | D. Healy | · | 1.7 km | MPC · JPL |
| 358277 | 2006 UK_{21} | — | October 16, 2006 | Kitt Peak | Spacewatch | · | 2.0 km | MPC · JPL |
| 358278 | 2006 UO_{31} | — | October 16, 2006 | Kitt Peak | Spacewatch | · | 1.7 km | MPC · JPL |
| 358279 | 2006 UX_{33} | — | October 16, 2006 | Kitt Peak | Spacewatch | · | 2.3 km | MPC · JPL |
| 358280 | 2006 UN_{38} | — | October 16, 2006 | Kitt Peak | Spacewatch | KOR | 1.4 km | MPC · JPL |
| 358281 | 2006 UK_{40} | — | October 16, 2006 | Kitt Peak | Spacewatch | MRX | 1.2 km | MPC · JPL |
| 358282 | 2006 UQ_{41} | — | October 16, 2006 | Kitt Peak | Spacewatch | · | 1.9 km | MPC · JPL |
| 358283 | 2006 UU_{41} | — | October 16, 2006 | Kitt Peak | Spacewatch | · | 2.0 km | MPC · JPL |
| 358284 | 2006 US_{44} | — | October 16, 2006 | Kitt Peak | Spacewatch | · | 2.7 km | MPC · JPL |
| 358285 | 2006 UC_{47} | — | October 16, 2006 | Kitt Peak | Spacewatch | KOR | 1.1 km | MPC · JPL |
| 358286 | 2006 UD_{49} | — | October 17, 2006 | Kitt Peak | Spacewatch | · | 1.9 km | MPC · JPL |
| 358287 | 2006 UE_{61} | — | October 19, 2006 | Kitt Peak | Spacewatch | · | 2.0 km | MPC · JPL |
| 358288 | 2006 UT_{65} | — | October 16, 2006 | Catalina | CSS | · | 2.1 km | MPC · JPL |
| 358289 | 2006 UM_{71} | — | October 16, 2006 | Bergisch Gladbach | W. Bickel | · | 1.9 km | MPC · JPL |
| 358290 | 2006 US_{86} | — | October 17, 2006 | Mount Lemmon | Mount Lemmon Survey | · | 2.3 km | MPC · JPL |
| 358291 | 2006 UZ_{87} | — | October 17, 2006 | Kitt Peak | Spacewatch | · | 2.0 km | MPC · JPL |
| 358292 | 2006 UW_{94} | — | October 18, 2006 | Kitt Peak | Spacewatch | · | 2.5 km | MPC · JPL |
| 358293 | 2006 UE_{96} | — | October 18, 2006 | Kitt Peak | Spacewatch | · | 1.7 km | MPC · JPL |
| 358294 | 2006 UP_{96} | — | October 18, 2006 | Kitt Peak | Spacewatch | WIT | 1.1 km | MPC · JPL |
| 358295 | 2006 UG_{101} | — | October 18, 2006 | Kitt Peak | Spacewatch | · | 1.9 km | MPC · JPL |
| 358296 | 2006 UF_{102} | — | October 18, 2006 | Kitt Peak | Spacewatch | · | 1.8 km | MPC · JPL |
| 358297 | 2006 UA_{110} | — | October 19, 2006 | Kitt Peak | Spacewatch | · | 3.4 km | MPC · JPL |
| 358298 | 2006 UT_{117} | — | October 19, 2006 | Kitt Peak | Spacewatch | · | 1.9 km | MPC · JPL |
| 358299 | 2006 UK_{125} | — | October 19, 2006 | Kitt Peak | Spacewatch | · | 1.8 km | MPC · JPL |
| 358300 | 2006 UL_{127} | — | October 19, 2006 | Kitt Peak | Spacewatch | · | 3.3 km | MPC · JPL |

== 358301–358400 ==
back to top

| Designation | | | Discovery | | | Properties | | Ref |
| Permanent | Provisional | Named after | Date | Site | Discoverer(s) | Category | Diam. | Ref |
|---|---|---|---|---|---|---|---|---|
| 358301 | 2006 US_{150} | — | October 20, 2006 | Mount Lemmon | Mount Lemmon Survey | · | 2.0 km | MPC · JPL |
| 358302 | 2006 UZ_{160} | — | October 21, 2006 | Mount Lemmon | Mount Lemmon Survey | · | 2.6 km | MPC · JPL |
| 358303 | 2006 UJ_{162} | — | October 21, 2006 | Mount Lemmon | Mount Lemmon Survey | · | 2.0 km | MPC · JPL |
| 358304 | 2006 UW_{165} | — | October 21, 2006 | Mount Lemmon | Mount Lemmon Survey | AGN | 1.1 km | MPC · JPL |
| 358305 | 2006 UC_{172} | — | October 21, 2006 | Mount Lemmon | Mount Lemmon Survey | · | 5.2 km | MPC · JPL |
| 358306 | 2006 UA_{183} | — | October 17, 2006 | Catalina | CSS | GEF | 1.3 km | MPC · JPL |
| 358307 | 2006 US_{185} | — | January 15, 1999 | Kitt Peak | Spacewatch | · | 2.3 km | MPC · JPL |
| 358308 | 2006 UO_{226} | — | October 20, 2006 | Palomar | NEAT | AEO | 1.3 km | MPC · JPL |
| 358309 | 2006 UK_{229} | — | September 28, 2006 | Mount Lemmon | Mount Lemmon Survey | · | 2.7 km | MPC · JPL |
| 358310 | 2006 UV_{240} | — | October 23, 2006 | Mount Lemmon | Mount Lemmon Survey | · | 1.9 km | MPC · JPL |
| 358311 | 2006 UG_{255} | — | October 20, 2006 | Socorro | LINEAR | · | 4.2 km | MPC · JPL |
| 358312 | 2006 UQ_{266} | — | October 27, 2006 | Kitt Peak | Spacewatch | THM | 2.1 km | MPC · JPL |
| 358313 | 2006 UG_{268} | — | October 27, 2006 | Mount Lemmon | Mount Lemmon Survey | · | 1.5 km | MPC · JPL |
| 358314 | 2006 UW_{268} | — | October 16, 2006 | Kitt Peak | Spacewatch | KOR | 1.1 km | MPC · JPL |
| 358315 | 2006 UR_{270} | — | October 27, 2006 | Mount Lemmon | Mount Lemmon Survey | · | 3.7 km | MPC · JPL |
| 358316 | 2006 UY_{271} | — | October 27, 2006 | Kitt Peak | Spacewatch | · | 2.1 km | MPC · JPL |
| 358317 | 2006 UX_{275} | — | October 28, 2006 | Kitt Peak | Spacewatch | AGN | 1.3 km | MPC · JPL |
| 358318 | 2006 UY_{288} | — | October 31, 2006 | Mount Lemmon | Mount Lemmon Survey | · | 1.6 km | MPC · JPL |
| 358319 | 2006 UE_{290} | — | October 31, 2006 | Kitt Peak | Spacewatch | · | 2.0 km | MPC · JPL |
| 358320 | 2006 UX_{329} | — | October 31, 2006 | Mount Lemmon | Mount Lemmon Survey | · | 2.1 km | MPC · JPL |
| 358321 | 2006 UY_{345} | — | October 16, 2006 | Kitt Peak | Spacewatch | KOR | 1.1 km | MPC · JPL |
| 358322 | 2006 UX_{360} | — | October 27, 2006 | Mount Lemmon | Mount Lemmon Survey | · | 3.6 km | MPC · JPL |
| 358323 | 2006 UZ_{360} | — | October 16, 2006 | Catalina | CSS | · | 2.9 km | MPC · JPL |
| 358324 | 2006 VT_{6} | — | November 10, 2006 | Kitt Peak | Spacewatch | · | 2.5 km | MPC · JPL |
| 358325 | 2006 VL_{16} | — | November 9, 2006 | Kitt Peak | Spacewatch | · | 1.9 km | MPC · JPL |
| 358326 | 2006 VH_{20} | — | November 9, 2006 | Kitt Peak | Spacewatch | · | 1.7 km | MPC · JPL |
| 358327 | 2006 VA_{24} | — | November 10, 2006 | Kitt Peak | Spacewatch | · | 1.5 km | MPC · JPL |
| 358328 | 2006 VB_{29} | — | November 10, 2006 | Kitt Peak | Spacewatch | · | 2.9 km | MPC · JPL |
| 358329 | 2006 VQ_{45} | — | November 14, 2006 | Kitt Peak | Spacewatch | · | 1.8 km | MPC · JPL |
| 358330 | 2006 VK_{62} | — | September 28, 2006 | Mount Lemmon | Mount Lemmon Survey | · | 1.8 km | MPC · JPL |
| 358331 | 2006 VF_{65} | — | November 11, 2006 | Kitt Peak | Spacewatch | · | 2.2 km | MPC · JPL |
| 358332 | 2006 VT_{65} | — | November 11, 2006 | Kitt Peak | Spacewatch | · | 1.8 km | MPC · JPL |
| 358333 | 2006 VY_{67} | — | November 11, 2006 | Kitt Peak | Spacewatch | · | 2.2 km | MPC · JPL |
| 358334 | 2006 VL_{74} | — | November 11, 2006 | Kitt Peak | Spacewatch | · | 4.9 km | MPC · JPL |
| 358335 | 2006 VH_{77} | — | November 12, 2006 | Mount Lemmon | Mount Lemmon Survey | · | 2.4 km | MPC · JPL |
| 358336 | 2006 VQ_{79} | — | November 12, 2006 | Mount Lemmon | Mount Lemmon Survey | · | 2.1 km | MPC · JPL |
| 358337 | 2006 VE_{81} | — | October 31, 2006 | Mount Lemmon | Mount Lemmon Survey | · | 3.2 km | MPC · JPL |
| 358338 | 2006 VQ_{91} | — | November 14, 2006 | Mount Lemmon | Mount Lemmon Survey | · | 2.6 km | MPC · JPL |
| 358339 | 2006 VM_{103} | — | November 12, 2006 | Lulin | Lin, H.-C., Q. Ye | · | 1.9 km | MPC · JPL |
| 358340 | 2006 VZ_{105} | — | November 13, 2006 | Mount Lemmon | Mount Lemmon Survey | · | 1.9 km | MPC · JPL |
| 358341 | 2006 VH_{112} | — | November 13, 2006 | Palomar | NEAT | · | 1.4 km | MPC · JPL |
| 358342 | 2006 VC_{115} | — | November 14, 2006 | Mount Lemmon | Mount Lemmon Survey | · | 2.0 km | MPC · JPL |
| 358343 | 2006 VR_{135} | — | November 15, 2006 | Kitt Peak | Spacewatch | · | 2.2 km | MPC · JPL |
| 358344 | 2006 VZ_{143} | — | November 15, 2006 | Catalina | CSS | · | 2.0 km | MPC · JPL |
| 358345 | 2006 WZ_{6} | — | November 16, 2006 | Mount Lemmon | Mount Lemmon Survey | · | 4.7 km | MPC · JPL |
| 358346 | 2006 WR_{19} | — | October 2, 2006 | Mount Lemmon | Mount Lemmon Survey | · | 2.0 km | MPC · JPL |
| 358347 | 2006 WZ_{38} | — | November 16, 2006 | Kitt Peak | Spacewatch | · | 1.8 km | MPC · JPL |
| 358348 | 2006 WQ_{48} | — | November 16, 2006 | Kitt Peak | Spacewatch | · | 2.1 km | MPC · JPL |
| 358349 | 2006 WS_{61} | — | November 17, 2006 | Catalina | CSS | WIT | 1.2 km | MPC · JPL |
| 358350 | 2006 WE_{77} | — | October 17, 2006 | Mount Lemmon | Mount Lemmon Survey | · | 3.2 km | MPC · JPL |
| 358351 | 2006 WX_{92} | — | November 19, 2006 | Kitt Peak | Spacewatch | KOR | 1.3 km | MPC · JPL |
| 358352 | 2006 WV_{103} | — | November 19, 2006 | Kitt Peak | Spacewatch | · | 2.0 km | MPC · JPL |
| 358353 | 2006 WZ_{103} | — | November 19, 2006 | Kitt Peak | Spacewatch | · | 1.6 km | MPC · JPL |
| 358354 | 2006 WX_{109} | — | November 19, 2006 | Kitt Peak | Spacewatch | KOR | 1.4 km | MPC · JPL |
| 358355 | 2006 WO_{111} | — | November 11, 2006 | Kitt Peak | Spacewatch | · | 1.5 km | MPC · JPL |
| 358356 | 2006 WF_{116} | — | October 27, 2006 | Kitt Peak | Spacewatch | AGN | 1.2 km | MPC · JPL |
| 358357 | 2006 WL_{123} | — | November 21, 2006 | Mount Lemmon | Mount Lemmon Survey | · | 2.8 km | MPC · JPL |
| 358358 | 2006 WV_{143} | — | November 20, 2006 | Kitt Peak | Spacewatch | KOR | 1.4 km | MPC · JPL |
| 358359 | 2006 WQ_{176} | — | November 23, 2006 | Mount Lemmon | Mount Lemmon Survey | · | 2.0 km | MPC · JPL |
| 358360 | 2006 WM_{188} | — | October 31, 2006 | Mount Lemmon | Mount Lemmon Survey | · | 2.1 km | MPC · JPL |
| 358361 | 2006 WF_{193} | — | November 11, 2006 | Kitt Peak | Spacewatch | · | 3.5 km | MPC · JPL |
| 358362 | 2006 WX_{197} | — | November 25, 2006 | Mount Lemmon | Mount Lemmon Survey | EOS | 2.3 km | MPC · JPL |
| 358363 | 2006 WK_{199} | — | October 28, 2006 | Mount Lemmon | Mount Lemmon Survey | · | 1.3 km | MPC · JPL |
| 358364 | 2006 WL_{200} | — | November 19, 2006 | Kitt Peak | Spacewatch | · | 1.6 km | MPC · JPL |
| 358365 | 2006 WL_{201} | — | November 20, 2006 | Catalina | CSS | · | 1.5 km | MPC · JPL |
| 358366 | 2006 WW_{201} | — | November 24, 2006 | Mount Lemmon | Mount Lemmon Survey | · | 4.4 km | MPC · JPL |
| 358367 | 2006 XT_{8} | — | December 9, 2006 | Palomar | NEAT | · | 3.6 km | MPC · JPL |
| 358368 | 2006 XW_{9} | — | December 9, 2006 | Kitt Peak | Spacewatch | · | 2.1 km | MPC · JPL |
| 358369 | 2006 XE_{15} | — | December 10, 2006 | Kitt Peak | Spacewatch | · | 3.8 km | MPC · JPL |
| 358370 | 2006 XC_{19} | — | December 11, 2006 | Kitt Peak | Spacewatch | EOS | 2.4 km | MPC · JPL |
| 358371 | 2006 XM_{20} | — | October 22, 2006 | Mount Lemmon | Mount Lemmon Survey | LIX | 3.3 km | MPC · JPL |
| 358372 | 2006 XN_{24} | — | December 12, 2006 | Catalina | CSS | H | 790 m | MPC · JPL |
| 358373 | 2006 XL_{27} | — | December 1, 2006 | Kitt Peak | Spacewatch | · | 2.2 km | MPC · JPL |
| 358374 | 2006 XS_{36} | — | December 11, 2006 | Kitt Peak | Spacewatch | · | 1.5 km | MPC · JPL |
| 358375 | 2006 XE_{37} | — | December 11, 2006 | Kitt Peak | Spacewatch | · | 5.0 km | MPC · JPL |
| 358376 Gwyn | 2006 XT_{67} | Gwyn | December 13, 2006 | Mauna Kea | D. D. Balam | · | 4.1 km | MPC · JPL |
| 358377 | 2006 XS_{69} | — | December 13, 2006 | Kitt Peak | Spacewatch | · | 2.0 km | MPC · JPL |
| 358378 | 2006 XJ_{71} | — | December 15, 2006 | Kitt Peak | Spacewatch | EOS | 2.4 km | MPC · JPL |
| 358379 | 2006 XY_{71} | — | December 1, 2006 | Mount Lemmon | Mount Lemmon Survey | · | 4.7 km | MPC · JPL |
| 358380 | 2006 XZ_{72} | — | December 15, 2006 | Kitt Peak | Spacewatch | · | 2.9 km | MPC · JPL |
| 358381 | 2006 XJ_{73} | — | December 15, 2006 | Kitt Peak | Spacewatch | · | 2.4 km | MPC · JPL |
| 358382 | 2006 YZ_{10} | — | November 27, 2006 | Mount Lemmon | Mount Lemmon Survey | · | 3.1 km | MPC · JPL |
| 358383 | 2006 YQ_{19} | — | December 24, 2006 | Kitt Peak | Spacewatch | · | 3.0 km | MPC · JPL |
| 358384 | 2006 YT_{29} | — | December 21, 2006 | Kitt Peak | Spacewatch | · | 2.1 km | MPC · JPL |
| 358385 | 2006 YK_{32} | — | December 16, 2006 | Mount Lemmon | Mount Lemmon Survey | · | 3.1 km | MPC · JPL |
| 358386 | 2006 YE_{36} | — | December 21, 2006 | Kitt Peak | Spacewatch | · | 2.0 km | MPC · JPL |
| 358387 | 2006 YP_{38} | — | December 21, 2006 | Kitt Peak | Spacewatch | HYG | 2.6 km | MPC · JPL |
| 358388 | 2006 YJ_{42} | — | December 22, 2006 | Mount Lemmon | Mount Lemmon Survey | · | 2.9 km | MPC · JPL |
| 358389 | 2006 YT_{42} | — | December 23, 2006 | Catalina | CSS | · | 3.4 km | MPC · JPL |
| 358390 | 2006 YT_{45} | — | December 12, 2006 | Kitt Peak | Spacewatch | · | 1.5 km | MPC · JPL |
| 358391 | 2006 YM_{51} | — | December 27, 2006 | Mount Lemmon | Mount Lemmon Survey | · | 2.3 km | MPC · JPL |
| 358392 | 2007 AR_{7} | — | January 9, 2007 | Mount Lemmon | Mount Lemmon Survey | EOS | 2.1 km | MPC · JPL |
| 358393 | 2007 AJ_{22} | — | January 15, 2007 | Kitt Peak | Spacewatch | · | 2.8 km | MPC · JPL |
| 358394 | 2007 AE_{24} | — | January 10, 2007 | Mount Lemmon | Mount Lemmon Survey | · | 4.5 km | MPC · JPL |
| 358395 | 2007 AP_{25} | — | January 15, 2007 | Anderson Mesa | LONEOS | · | 3.1 km | MPC · JPL |
| 358396 | 2007 AK_{30} | — | January 10, 2007 | Mount Lemmon | Mount Lemmon Survey | EOS | 1.9 km | MPC · JPL |
| 358397 | 2007 AO_{31} | — | January 10, 2007 | Kitt Peak | Spacewatch | · | 3.4 km | MPC · JPL |
| 358398 | 2007 BD_{6} | — | January 17, 2007 | Palomar | NEAT | · | 4.8 km | MPC · JPL |
| 358399 | 2007 BE_{6} | — | January 17, 2007 | Palomar | NEAT | THB | 4.4 km | MPC · JPL |
| 358400 | 2007 BD_{22} | — | January 24, 2007 | Socorro | LINEAR | EOS | 2.4 km | MPC · JPL |

== 358401–358500 ==
back to top

| Designation | | | Discovery | | | Properties | | Ref |
| Permanent | Provisional | Named after | Date | Site | Discoverer(s) | Category | Diam. | Ref |
|---|---|---|---|---|---|---|---|---|
| 358401 | 2007 BL_{26} | — | January 24, 2007 | Mount Lemmon | Mount Lemmon Survey | · | 3.8 km | MPC · JPL |
| 358402 | 2007 BJ_{35} | — | January 24, 2007 | Mount Lemmon | Mount Lemmon Survey | EOS | 2.1 km | MPC · JPL |
| 358403 | 2007 BR_{40} | — | January 24, 2007 | Mount Lemmon | Mount Lemmon Survey | THM | 1.9 km | MPC · JPL |
| 358404 | 2007 BX_{43} | — | January 24, 2007 | Catalina | CSS | · | 4.2 km | MPC · JPL |
| 358405 | 2007 BO_{54} | — | January 24, 2007 | Kitt Peak | Spacewatch | · | 2.5 km | MPC · JPL |
| 358406 | 2007 BM_{58} | — | January 24, 2007 | Catalina | CSS | · | 3.7 km | MPC · JPL |
| 358407 | 2007 BJ_{71} | — | January 28, 2007 | Mount Lemmon | Mount Lemmon Survey | EOS | 2.4 km | MPC · JPL |
| 358408 | 2007 BU_{79} | — | January 26, 2007 | Kitt Peak | Spacewatch | · | 3.8 km | MPC · JPL |
| 358409 | 2007 CE_{2} | — | February 6, 2007 | Kitt Peak | Spacewatch | · | 4.7 km | MPC · JPL |
| 358410 | 2007 CT_{5} | — | February 7, 2007 | Catalina | CSS | · | 3.7 km | MPC · JPL |
| 358411 | 2007 CA_{7} | — | December 13, 2006 | Mount Lemmon | Mount Lemmon Survey | · | 3.5 km | MPC · JPL |
| 358412 | 2007 CN_{12} | — | February 6, 2007 | Kitt Peak | Spacewatch | · | 4.9 km | MPC · JPL |
| 358413 | 2007 CS_{13} | — | February 7, 2007 | Kitt Peak | Spacewatch | · | 2.9 km | MPC · JPL |
| 358414 | 2007 CS_{20} | — | February 6, 2007 | Mount Lemmon | Mount Lemmon Survey | VER | 3.6 km | MPC · JPL |
| 358415 | 2007 CA_{24} | — | February 8, 2007 | Kitt Peak | Spacewatch | EOS | 2.0 km | MPC · JPL |
| 358416 | 2007 CN_{24} | — | February 8, 2007 | Mount Lemmon | Mount Lemmon Survey | EOS | 2.5 km | MPC · JPL |
| 358417 | 2007 CN_{25} | — | February 8, 2007 | Kitt Peak | Spacewatch | · | 3.6 km | MPC · JPL |
| 358418 | 2007 CV_{35} | — | February 6, 2007 | Mount Lemmon | Mount Lemmon Survey | · | 4.5 km | MPC · JPL |
| 358419 | 2007 CS_{36} | — | February 6, 2007 | Mount Lemmon | Mount Lemmon Survey | · | 2.8 km | MPC · JPL |
| 358420 | 2007 CP_{43} | — | February 8, 2007 | Kitt Peak | Spacewatch | EOS | 2.4 km | MPC · JPL |
| 358421 | 2007 CO_{53} | — | February 15, 2007 | Palomar | NEAT | LIX | 5.4 km | MPC · JPL |
| 358422 | 2007 CX_{58} | — | February 10, 2007 | Catalina | CSS | · | 5.5 km | MPC · JPL |
| 358423 | 2007 CF_{61} | — | February 15, 2007 | Palomar | NEAT | · | 4.5 km | MPC · JPL |
| 358424 | 2007 CU_{62} | — | February 15, 2007 | Catalina | CSS | · | 4.9 km | MPC · JPL |
| 358425 | 2007 DV_{4} | — | February 17, 2007 | Kitt Peak | Spacewatch | · | 2.6 km | MPC · JPL |
| 358426 | 2007 DC_{8} | — | February 21, 2007 | Eskridge | G. Hug | fast | 4.6 km | MPC · JPL |
| 358427 | 2007 DZ_{13} | — | February 17, 2007 | Kitt Peak | Spacewatch | · | 2.9 km | MPC · JPL |
| 358428 | 2007 DR_{14} | — | February 8, 2007 | Kitt Peak | Spacewatch | · | 3.2 km | MPC · JPL |
| 358429 | 2007 DK_{15} | — | October 7, 2004 | Kitt Peak | Spacewatch | VER | 2.9 km | MPC · JPL |
| 358430 | 2007 DM_{16} | — | February 17, 2007 | Kitt Peak | Spacewatch | · | 3.6 km | MPC · JPL |
| 358431 | 2007 DM_{18} | — | February 17, 2007 | Kitt Peak | Spacewatch | · | 3.4 km | MPC · JPL |
| 358432 | 2007 DZ_{23} | — | February 17, 2007 | Kitt Peak | Spacewatch | · | 2.9 km | MPC · JPL |
| 358433 | 2007 DC_{29} | — | February 17, 2007 | Kitt Peak | Spacewatch | · | 3.3 km | MPC · JPL |
| 358434 | 2007 DB_{41} | — | February 21, 2007 | Catalina | CSS | TIR | 3.2 km | MPC · JPL |
| 358435 | 2007 DU_{41} | — | February 16, 2007 | Catalina | CSS | (58892) | 3.9 km | MPC · JPL |
| 358436 | 2007 DG_{42} | — | February 16, 2007 | Palomar | NEAT | · | 4.3 km | MPC · JPL |
| 358437 | 2007 DU_{77} | — | February 22, 2007 | Anderson Mesa | LONEOS | T_{j} (2.98) | 4.5 km | MPC · JPL |
| 358438 | 2007 DZ_{82} | — | February 23, 2007 | Catalina | CSS | · | 1.5 km | MPC · JPL |
| 358439 | 2007 DL_{86} | — | February 23, 2007 | Mount Lemmon | Mount Lemmon Survey | LIX | 4.7 km | MPC · JPL |
| 358440 | 2007 DP_{90} | — | February 23, 2007 | Kitt Peak | Spacewatch | · | 3.6 km | MPC · JPL |
| 358441 | 2007 DB_{94} | — | February 23, 2007 | Kitt Peak | Spacewatch | (5931) | 4.0 km | MPC · JPL |
| 358442 | 2007 DF_{98} | — | February 25, 2007 | Mount Lemmon | Mount Lemmon Survey | · | 3.7 km | MPC · JPL |
| 358443 | 2007 DF_{99} | — | February 25, 2007 | Mount Lemmon | Mount Lemmon Survey | · | 3.6 km | MPC · JPL |
| 358444 | 2007 DV_{116} | — | February 21, 2007 | Catalina | CSS | · | 5.6 km | MPC · JPL |
| 358445 | 2007 DC_{117} | — | February 17, 2007 | Goodricke-Pigott | R. A. Tucker | · | 6.2 km | MPC · JPL |
| 358446 | 2007 DJ_{117} | — | February 25, 2007 | Mount Lemmon | Mount Lemmon Survey | CYB | 3.5 km | MPC · JPL |
| 358447 | 2007 EB_{35} | — | March 11, 2007 | Kitt Peak | Spacewatch | · | 2.5 km | MPC · JPL |
| 358448 | 2007 EC_{35} | — | March 11, 2007 | Kitt Peak | Spacewatch | CYB | 2.6 km | MPC · JPL |
| 358449 | 2007 EM_{36} | — | March 11, 2007 | Anderson Mesa | LONEOS | · | 4.5 km | MPC · JPL |
| 358450 | 2007 EN_{54} | — | March 12, 2007 | Mount Lemmon | Mount Lemmon Survey | · | 3.4 km | MPC · JPL |
| 358451 | 2007 EM_{60} | — | March 10, 2007 | Kitt Peak | Spacewatch | · | 3.0 km | MPC · JPL |
| 358452 | 2007 EZ_{82} | — | March 12, 2007 | Kitt Peak | Spacewatch | · | 3.5 km | MPC · JPL |
| 358453 | 2007 EH_{88} | — | March 14, 2007 | Mount Lemmon | Mount Lemmon Survey | APO | 380 m | MPC · JPL |
| 358454 | 2007 EX_{100} | — | March 11, 2007 | Mount Lemmon | Mount Lemmon Survey | · | 4.2 km | MPC · JPL |
| 358455 | 2007 EG_{131} | — | March 9, 2007 | Mount Lemmon | Mount Lemmon Survey | · | 2.6 km | MPC · JPL |
| 358456 | 2007 EP_{138} | — | March 12, 2007 | Kitt Peak | Spacewatch | THM | 2.3 km | MPC · JPL |
| 358457 | 2007 EA_{152} | — | March 12, 2007 | Mount Lemmon | Mount Lemmon Survey | HYG | 3.3 km | MPC · JPL |
| 358458 | 2007 EF_{157} | — | February 17, 2007 | Mount Lemmon | Mount Lemmon Survey | · | 3.7 km | MPC · JPL |
| 358459 | 2007 EG_{158} | — | February 16, 2007 | Catalina | CSS | EUP | 4.6 km | MPC · JPL |
| 358460 | 2007 EA_{162} | — | March 15, 2007 | Mount Lemmon | Mount Lemmon Survey | · | 2.7 km | MPC · JPL |
| 358461 | 2007 FS_{15} | — | March 19, 2007 | Anderson Mesa | LONEOS | EUP | 4.7 km | MPC · JPL |
| 358462 | 2007 FJ_{16} | — | March 20, 2007 | Mount Lemmon | Mount Lemmon Survey | THM | 2.7 km | MPC · JPL |
| 358463 | 2007 GU_{68} | — | September 26, 2003 | Apache Point | SDSS | CYB | 4.1 km | MPC · JPL |
| 358464 | 2007 HK_{60} | — | April 20, 2007 | Mount Lemmon | Mount Lemmon Survey | · | 4.0 km | MPC · JPL |
| 358465 | 2007 JQ_{45} | — | May 11, 2007 | Mount Lemmon | Mount Lemmon Survey | · | 560 m | MPC · JPL |
| 358466 | 2007 LX_{1} | — | June 7, 2007 | Kitt Peak | Spacewatch | · | 730 m | MPC · JPL |
| 358467 | 2007 MY_{1} | — | June 18, 2007 | Kitt Peak | Spacewatch | · | 920 m | MPC · JPL |
| 358468 | 2007 MO_{3} | — | June 16, 2007 | Kitt Peak | Spacewatch | · | 900 m | MPC · JPL |
| 358469 | 2007 NO_{2} | — | July 13, 2007 | Dauban | Chante-Perdrix | · | 920 m | MPC · JPL |
| 358470 | 2007 NH_{3} | — | July 14, 2007 | Dauban | Chante-Perdrix | · | 910 m | MPC · JPL |
| 358471 | 2007 NS_{4} | — | July 15, 2007 | Siding Spring | SSS | APO · PHA | 520 m | MPC · JPL |
| 358472 | 2007 OT_{10} | — | July 20, 2007 | Siding Spring | SSS | PHO | 2.9 km | MPC · JPL |
| 358473 | 2007 PA_{5} | — | August 5, 2007 | Socorro | LINEAR | · | 740 m | MPC · JPL |
| 358474 | 2007 PA_{12} | — | August 11, 2007 | Socorro | LINEAR | · | 920 m | MPC · JPL |
| 358475 | 2007 PX_{15} | — | August 8, 2007 | Socorro | LINEAR | · | 1.0 km | MPC · JPL |
| 358476 | 2007 PT_{20} | — | August 9, 2007 | Socorro | LINEAR | · | 1.1 km | MPC · JPL |
| 358477 | 2007 PV_{25} | — | August 8, 2007 | Socorro | LINEAR | · | 720 m | MPC · JPL |
| 358478 | 2007 PJ_{42} | — | August 13, 2007 | Socorro | LINEAR | · | 760 m | MPC · JPL |
| 358479 | 2007 PF_{46} | — | August 10, 2007 | Kitt Peak | Spacewatch | · | 960 m | MPC · JPL |
| 358480 | 2007 QO_{11} | — | August 23, 2007 | Kitt Peak | Spacewatch | · | 1.1 km | MPC · JPL |
| 358481 | 2007 QT_{17} | — | January 17, 2005 | Kitt Peak | Spacewatch | MAS | 820 m | MPC · JPL |
| 358482 | 2007 RL | — | September 1, 2007 | Dauban | C. Rinner, Kugel, F. | · | 1.3 km | MPC · JPL |
| 358483 | 2007 RU_{1} | — | September 1, 2007 | Siding Spring | K. Sárneczky, L. Kiss | · | 770 m | MPC · JPL |
| 358484 | 2007 RG_{21} | — | September 3, 2007 | Catalina | CSS | · | 700 m | MPC · JPL |
| 358485 | 2007 RF_{38} | — | September 8, 2007 | Anderson Mesa | LONEOS | NYS | 1.4 km | MPC · JPL |
| 358486 | 2007 RD_{45} | — | September 9, 2007 | Kitt Peak | Spacewatch | · | 1.4 km | MPC · JPL |
| 358487 | 2007 RU_{47} | — | September 9, 2007 | Mount Lemmon | Mount Lemmon Survey | · | 1.1 km | MPC · JPL |
| 358488 | 2007 RL_{56} | — | September 9, 2007 | Anderson Mesa | LONEOS | · | 1.7 km | MPC · JPL |
| 358489 | 2007 RP_{60} | — | September 10, 2007 | Catalina | CSS | · | 1.4 km | MPC · JPL |
| 358490 | 2007 RU_{86} | — | September 10, 2007 | Mount Lemmon | Mount Lemmon Survey | · | 1.7 km | MPC · JPL |
| 358491 | 2007 RT_{94} | — | September 10, 2007 | Kitt Peak | Spacewatch | NYS | 1.2 km | MPC · JPL |
| 358492 | 2007 RZ_{95} | — | September 10, 2007 | Kitt Peak | Spacewatch | PHO | 1.3 km | MPC · JPL |
| 358493 | 2007 RK_{98} | — | September 10, 2007 | Kitt Peak | Spacewatch | (5) | 1.1 km | MPC · JPL |
| 358494 | 2007 RB_{105} | — | September 11, 2007 | Catalina | CSS | (2076) | 970 m | MPC · JPL |
| 358495 | 2007 RQ_{118} | — | September 11, 2007 | Mount Lemmon | Mount Lemmon Survey | · | 1.7 km | MPC · JPL |
| 358496 | 2007 RQ_{120} | — | September 12, 2007 | Mount Lemmon | Mount Lemmon Survey | V | 670 m | MPC · JPL |
| 358497 | 2007 RB_{142} | — | September 13, 2007 | Socorro | LINEAR | · | 3.0 km | MPC · JPL |
| 358498 | 2007 RP_{145} | — | September 14, 2007 | Socorro | LINEAR | · | 1.3 km | MPC · JPL |
| 358499 | 2007 RR_{148} | — | September 12, 2007 | Catalina | CSS | · | 860 m | MPC · JPL |
| 358500 | 2007 RB_{151} | — | September 9, 2007 | Mount Lemmon | Mount Lemmon Survey | · | 1.2 km | MPC · JPL |

== 358501–358600 ==
back to top

| Designation | | | Discovery | | | Properties | | Ref |
| Permanent | Provisional | Named after | Date | Site | Discoverer(s) | Category | Diam. | Ref |
|---|---|---|---|---|---|---|---|---|
| 358501 | 2007 RB_{153} | — | August 24, 2007 | Kitt Peak | Spacewatch | L4 | 7.5 km | MPC · JPL |
| 358502 | 2007 RW_{153} | — | September 10, 2007 | Kitt Peak | Spacewatch | NYS | 1.3 km | MPC · JPL |
| 358503 | 2007 RH_{173} | — | September 10, 2007 | Kitt Peak | Spacewatch | · | 680 m | MPC · JPL |
| 358504 | 2007 RN_{173} | — | September 10, 2007 | Kitt Peak | Spacewatch | V | 890 m | MPC · JPL |
| 358505 | 2007 RR_{178} | — | September 10, 2007 | Kitt Peak | Spacewatch | · | 1.0 km | MPC · JPL |
| 358506 | 2007 RQ_{189} | — | September 10, 2007 | Kitt Peak | Spacewatch | V | 690 m | MPC · JPL |
| 358507 | 2007 RQ_{196} | — | September 13, 2007 | Mount Lemmon | Mount Lemmon Survey | V | 590 m | MPC · JPL |
| 358508 | 2007 RC_{205} | — | September 9, 2007 | Kitt Peak | Spacewatch | · | 840 m | MPC · JPL |
| 358509 | 2007 RB_{211} | — | September 11, 2007 | Kitt Peak | Spacewatch | · | 1.1 km | MPC · JPL |
| 358510 | 2007 RQ_{211} | — | September 11, 2007 | Kitt Peak | Spacewatch | V | 660 m | MPC · JPL |
| 358511 | 2007 RB_{222} | — | September 14, 2007 | Mount Lemmon | Mount Lemmon Survey | MAS | 840 m | MPC · JPL |
| 358512 | 2007 RJ_{237} | — | September 14, 2007 | Mount Lemmon | Mount Lemmon Survey | · | 1.0 km | MPC · JPL |
| 358513 | 2007 RM_{255} | — | September 14, 2007 | Kitt Peak | Spacewatch | L4 | 7.8 km | MPC · JPL |
| 358514 | 2007 RQ_{291} | — | September 12, 2007 | Mount Lemmon | Mount Lemmon Survey | V | 710 m | MPC · JPL |
| 358515 | 2007 RQ_{294} | — | September 14, 2007 | Mount Lemmon | Mount Lemmon Survey | · | 1.1 km | MPC · JPL |
| 358516 | 2007 RL_{295} | — | September 14, 2007 | Mount Lemmon | Mount Lemmon Survey | · | 890 m | MPC · JPL |
| 358517 | 2007 RA_{309} | — | September 10, 2007 | Kitt Peak | Spacewatch | V | 880 m | MPC · JPL |
| 358518 | 2007 RD_{309} | — | September 10, 2007 | Mount Lemmon | Mount Lemmon Survey | L4 | 6.9 km | MPC · JPL |
| 358519 | 2007 RE_{309} | — | September 10, 2007 | Mount Lemmon | Mount Lemmon Survey | L4 | 7.4 km | MPC · JPL |
| 358520 | 2007 RB_{310} | — | August 12, 2007 | Socorro | LINEAR | · | 1.5 km | MPC · JPL |
| 358521 | 2007 RG_{314} | — | September 14, 2007 | Mount Lemmon | Mount Lemmon Survey | · | 1.3 km | MPC · JPL |
| 358522 | 2007 RH_{318} | — | September 11, 2007 | Kitt Peak | Spacewatch | · | 1.0 km | MPC · JPL |
| 358523 | 2007 RH_{325} | — | September 14, 2007 | Mount Lemmon | Mount Lemmon Survey | · | 1.3 km | MPC · JPL |
| 358524 | 2007 SL_{2} | — | September 20, 2007 | Altschwendt | W. Ries | · | 1.1 km | MPC · JPL |
| 358525 | 2007 SS_{17} | — | September 30, 2007 | Kitt Peak | Spacewatch | · | 920 m | MPC · JPL |
| 358526 | 2007 SV_{23} | — | September 18, 2007 | Mount Lemmon | Mount Lemmon Survey | · | 1.5 km | MPC · JPL |
| 358527 | 2007 TE_{7} | — | October 7, 2007 | Dauban | Chante-Perdrix | · | 1.8 km | MPC · JPL |
| 358528 | 2007 TR_{9} | — | October 6, 2007 | Socorro | LINEAR | · | 1.3 km | MPC · JPL |
| 358529 | 2007 TN_{13} | — | October 6, 2007 | Socorro | LINEAR | · | 2.2 km | MPC · JPL |
| 358530 | 2007 TR_{22} | — | October 9, 2007 | Catalina | CSS | EUN | 1.3 km | MPC · JPL |
| 358531 | 2007 TU_{25} | — | October 4, 2007 | Kitt Peak | Spacewatch | MAS | 700 m | MPC · JPL |
| 358532 | 2007 TN_{31} | — | August 23, 2007 | Kitt Peak | Spacewatch | · | 1.5 km | MPC · JPL |
| 358533 | 2007 TP_{35} | — | October 7, 2007 | Catalina | CSS | · | 1.5 km | MPC · JPL |
| 358534 | 2007 TU_{35} | — | October 7, 2007 | Kitt Peak | Spacewatch | · | 1.7 km | MPC · JPL |
| 358535 | 2007 TN_{49} | — | October 4, 2007 | Kitt Peak | Spacewatch | · | 1.4 km | MPC · JPL |
| 358536 | 2007 TX_{52} | — | October 4, 2007 | Kitt Peak | Spacewatch | · | 1.1 km | MPC · JPL |
| 358537 | 2007 TY_{56} | — | October 4, 2007 | Kitt Peak | Spacewatch | · | 1.5 km | MPC · JPL |
| 358538 | 2007 TR_{66} | — | October 10, 2007 | Dauban | Chante-Perdrix | · | 890 m | MPC · JPL |
| 358539 | 2007 TM_{73} | — | March 26, 2003 | Kitt Peak | Spacewatch | · | 820 m | MPC · JPL |
| 358540 | 2007 TS_{92} | — | October 5, 2007 | La Cañada | Lacruz, J. | · | 700 m | MPC · JPL |
| 358541 | 2007 TZ_{100} | — | October 8, 2007 | Mount Lemmon | Mount Lemmon Survey | · | 800 m | MPC · JPL |
| 358542 | 2007 TV_{115} | — | October 8, 2007 | Mount Lemmon | Mount Lemmon Survey | · | 1.2 km | MPC · JPL |
| 358543 | 2007 TM_{120} | — | October 9, 2007 | Catalina | CSS | EUN | 1.2 km | MPC · JPL |
| 358544 | 2007 TC_{123} | — | September 8, 2007 | Mount Lemmon | Mount Lemmon Survey | · | 1.7 km | MPC · JPL |
| 358545 | 2007 TU_{126} | — | October 6, 2007 | Kitt Peak | Spacewatch | · | 1.1 km | MPC · JPL |
| 358546 | 2007 TE_{127} | — | October 6, 2007 | Kitt Peak | Spacewatch | · | 950 m | MPC · JPL |
| 358547 | 2007 TJ_{132} | — | October 7, 2007 | Mount Lemmon | Mount Lemmon Survey | PHO | 2.3 km | MPC · JPL |
| 358548 | 2007 TP_{148} | — | October 7, 2007 | Catalina | CSS | · | 1.3 km | MPC · JPL |
| 358549 | 2007 TQ_{154} | — | October 9, 2007 | Socorro | LINEAR | · | 1.6 km | MPC · JPL |
| 358550 | 2007 TM_{155} | — | October 9, 2007 | Socorro | LINEAR | · | 1.1 km | MPC · JPL |
| 358551 | 2007 TC_{157} | — | October 9, 2007 | Socorro | LINEAR | · | 1.1 km | MPC · JPL |
| 358552 | 2007 TG_{162} | — | October 11, 2007 | Socorro | LINEAR | · | 870 m | MPC · JPL |
| 358553 | 2007 TD_{163} | — | October 11, 2007 | Socorro | LINEAR | · | 1.3 km | MPC · JPL |
| 358554 | 2007 TL_{165} | — | October 11, 2007 | Socorro | LINEAR | · | 1.7 km | MPC · JPL |
| 358555 | 2007 TD_{191} | — | October 4, 2007 | Mount Lemmon | Mount Lemmon Survey | · | 1.0 km | MPC · JPL |
| 358556 | 2007 TS_{197} | — | October 8, 2007 | Kitt Peak | Spacewatch | · | 2.2 km | MPC · JPL |
| 358557 | 2007 TV_{198} | — | October 8, 2007 | Kitt Peak | Spacewatch | · | 1.2 km | MPC · JPL |
| 358558 | 2007 TP_{201} | — | October 8, 2007 | Anderson Mesa | LONEOS | · | 1.8 km | MPC · JPL |
| 358559 | 2007 TE_{222} | — | October 9, 2007 | Kitt Peak | Spacewatch | · | 990 m | MPC · JPL |
| 358560 | 2007 TE_{227} | — | October 8, 2007 | Kitt Peak | Spacewatch | · | 930 m | MPC · JPL |
| 358561 | 2007 TO_{232} | — | October 8, 2007 | Kitt Peak | Spacewatch | · | 1.6 km | MPC · JPL |
| 358562 | 2007 TC_{235} | — | October 9, 2007 | Kitt Peak | Spacewatch | · | 1.5 km | MPC · JPL |
| 358563 | 2007 TV_{239} | — | October 10, 2007 | Mount Lemmon | Mount Lemmon Survey | · | 1.3 km | MPC · JPL |
| 358564 | 2007 TP_{241} | — | October 7, 2007 | Mount Lemmon | Mount Lemmon Survey | · | 1.2 km | MPC · JPL |
| 358565 | 2007 TS_{247} | — | October 10, 2007 | Kitt Peak | Spacewatch | · | 1.3 km | MPC · JPL |
| 358566 | 2007 TG_{301} | — | October 12, 2007 | Kitt Peak | Spacewatch | · | 1.1 km | MPC · JPL |
| 358567 | 2007 TF_{332} | — | October 11, 2007 | Kitt Peak | Spacewatch | · | 1.3 km | MPC · JPL |
| 358568 | 2007 TY_{336} | — | October 12, 2007 | Catalina | CSS | · | 1.1 km | MPC · JPL |
| 358569 | 2007 TD_{340} | — | October 9, 2007 | Mount Lemmon | Mount Lemmon Survey | · | 1.2 km | MPC · JPL |
| 358570 | 2007 TM_{353} | — | October 8, 2007 | Mount Lemmon | Mount Lemmon Survey | · | 1.7 km | MPC · JPL |
| 358571 | 2007 TY_{353} | — | October 10, 2007 | Kitt Peak | Spacewatch | · | 1.7 km | MPC · JPL |
| 358572 | 2007 TD_{363} | — | October 14, 2007 | Mount Lemmon | Mount Lemmon Survey | · | 1.7 km | MPC · JPL |
| 358573 | 2007 TA_{383} | — | October 14, 2007 | Kitt Peak | Spacewatch | · | 1.7 km | MPC · JPL |
| 358574 | 2007 TK_{395} | — | January 13, 2005 | Kitt Peak | Spacewatch | V | 860 m | MPC · JPL |
| 358575 | 2007 TJ_{423} | — | October 4, 2007 | Kitt Peak | Spacewatch | · | 1.1 km | MPC · JPL |
| 358576 | 2007 TO_{423} | — | October 4, 2007 | Kitt Peak | Spacewatch | · | 1.8 km | MPC · JPL |
| 358577 | 2007 TM_{424} | — | October 7, 2007 | Kitt Peak | Spacewatch | · | 1.8 km | MPC · JPL |
| 358578 | 2007 TE_{426} | — | October 9, 2007 | Mount Lemmon | Mount Lemmon Survey | KON | 1.7 km | MPC · JPL |
| 358579 | 2007 TE_{441} | — | October 10, 2007 | Catalina | CSS | · | 1.5 km | MPC · JPL |
| 358580 | 2007 TS_{450} | — | October 12, 2007 | Mount Lemmon | Mount Lemmon Survey | · | 2.6 km | MPC · JPL |
| 358581 | 2007 UD_{5} | — | October 19, 2007 | Bisei SG Center | BATTeRS | (5) | 1.4 km | MPC · JPL |
| 358582 | 2007 UE_{8} | — | October 16, 2007 | Catalina | CSS | · | 1.4 km | MPC · JPL |
| 358583 | 2007 UP_{12} | — | October 16, 2007 | Kitt Peak | Spacewatch | (6769) | 1.2 km | MPC · JPL |
| 358584 | 2007 UB_{24} | — | October 8, 2007 | Mount Lemmon | Mount Lemmon Survey | · | 900 m | MPC · JPL |
| 358585 | 2007 UG_{30} | — | October 8, 2007 | Anderson Mesa | LONEOS | (5) | 1.3 km | MPC · JPL |
| 358586 | 2007 UE_{31} | — | October 19, 2007 | Catalina | CSS | (5) | 1.2 km | MPC · JPL |
| 358587 | 2007 UP_{31} | — | October 7, 2007 | Catalina | CSS | · | 1.3 km | MPC · JPL |
| 358588 | 2007 UU_{36} | — | October 10, 2007 | Anderson Mesa | LONEOS | (5) | 1.4 km | MPC · JPL |
| 358589 | 2007 UV_{37} | — | September 11, 2007 | Catalina | CSS | · | 1.4 km | MPC · JPL |
| 358590 | 2007 UH_{55} | — | October 30, 2007 | Kitt Peak | Spacewatch | · | 1 km | MPC · JPL |
| 358591 | 2007 UJ_{56} | — | October 30, 2007 | Mount Lemmon | Mount Lemmon Survey | · | 1.1 km | MPC · JPL |
| 358592 | 2007 UN_{56} | — | October 30, 2007 | Catalina | CSS | · | 1.7 km | MPC · JPL |
| 358593 | 2007 UD_{76} | — | October 31, 2007 | Mount Lemmon | Mount Lemmon Survey | · | 1.5 km | MPC · JPL |
| 358594 | 2007 UW_{80} | — | October 31, 2007 | Mount Lemmon | Mount Lemmon Survey | · | 900 m | MPC · JPL |
| 358595 | 2007 UZ_{86} | — | October 30, 2007 | Kitt Peak | Spacewatch | · | 820 m | MPC · JPL |
| 358596 | 2007 UW_{94} | — | October 31, 2007 | Mount Lemmon | Mount Lemmon Survey | NYS | 1.2 km | MPC · JPL |
| 358597 | 2007 US_{100} | — | October 30, 2007 | Kitt Peak | Spacewatch | · | 1.3 km | MPC · JPL |
| 358598 | 2007 UE_{105} | — | October 30, 2007 | Kitt Peak | Spacewatch | · | 1.3 km | MPC · JPL |
| 358599 | 2007 UP_{127} | — | October 16, 2007 | Kitt Peak | Spacewatch | · | 1.3 km | MPC · JPL |
| 358600 | 2007 UX_{136} | — | October 25, 2007 | Mount Lemmon | Mount Lemmon Survey | · | 1.2 km | MPC · JPL |

== 358601–358700 ==
back to top

| Designation | | | Discovery | | | Properties | | Ref |
| Permanent | Provisional | Named after | Date | Site | Discoverer(s) | Category | Diam. | Ref |
|---|---|---|---|---|---|---|---|---|
| 358601 | 2007 UL_{137} | — | October 16, 2007 | Mount Lemmon | Mount Lemmon Survey | · | 1.4 km | MPC · JPL |
| 358602 | 2007 VA_{2} | — | November 2, 2007 | Mayhill | Lowe, A. | · | 1.6 km | MPC · JPL |
| 358603 | 2007 VP_{3} | — | November 2, 2007 | Kitami | K. Endate | · | 1.9 km | MPC · JPL |
| 358604 | 2007 VQ_{3} | — | November 2, 2007 | Tiki | Teamo, N. | · | 1.8 km | MPC · JPL |
| 358605 | 2007 VE_{12} | — | November 4, 2007 | La Sagra | OAM | · | 2.1 km | MPC · JPL |
| 358606 | 2007 VZ_{27} | — | November 2, 2007 | Kitt Peak | Spacewatch | · | 1.2 km | MPC · JPL |
| 358607 | 2007 VQ_{29} | — | November 5, 2007 | Mount Lemmon | Mount Lemmon Survey | HNS | 1.3 km | MPC · JPL |
| 358608 | 2007 VB_{33} | — | November 2, 2007 | Kitt Peak | Spacewatch | · | 930 m | MPC · JPL |
| 358609 | 2007 VC_{48} | — | November 1, 2007 | Kitt Peak | Spacewatch | · | 1.8 km | MPC · JPL |
| 358610 | 2007 VK_{60} | — | August 24, 2007 | Kitt Peak | Spacewatch | · | 1.6 km | MPC · JPL |
| 358611 | 2007 VM_{66} | — | November 2, 2007 | Catalina | CSS | · | 2.1 km | MPC · JPL |
| 358612 | 2007 VG_{77} | — | November 3, 2007 | Kitt Peak | Spacewatch | · | 990 m | MPC · JPL |
| 358613 | 2007 VH_{78} | — | October 12, 2007 | Kitt Peak | Spacewatch | · | 1.3 km | MPC · JPL |
| 358614 | 2007 VT_{87} | — | November 2, 2007 | Socorro | LINEAR | · | 1.6 km | MPC · JPL |
| 358615 | 2007 VQ_{89} | — | November 4, 2007 | Socorro | LINEAR | · | 1.4 km | MPC · JPL |
| 358616 | 2007 VV_{96} | — | November 1, 2007 | Kitt Peak | Spacewatch | · | 1.3 km | MPC · JPL |
| 358617 | 2007 VZ_{114} | — | November 3, 2007 | Kitt Peak | Spacewatch | · | 1.5 km | MPC · JPL |
| 358618 | 2007 VK_{119} | — | November 4, 2007 | Purple Mountain | PMO NEO Survey Program | KON | 2.6 km | MPC · JPL |
| 358619 | 2007 VO_{120} | — | November 5, 2007 | Kitt Peak | Spacewatch | · | 1.2 km | MPC · JPL |
| 358620 | 2007 VF_{121} | — | November 5, 2007 | Kitt Peak | Spacewatch | · | 1.2 km | MPC · JPL |
| 358621 | 2007 VM_{122} | — | November 5, 2007 | Kitt Peak | Spacewatch | · | 1.7 km | MPC · JPL |
| 358622 | 2007 VJ_{141} | — | November 4, 2007 | Kitt Peak | Spacewatch | · | 1.1 km | MPC · JPL |
| 358623 | 2007 VD_{143} | — | November 4, 2007 | Kitt Peak | Spacewatch | · | 2.1 km | MPC · JPL |
| 358624 | 2007 VN_{147} | — | November 4, 2007 | Kitt Peak | Spacewatch | · | 1.6 km | MPC · JPL |
| 358625 | 2007 VM_{153} | — | November 4, 2007 | Kitt Peak | Spacewatch | · | 1.5 km | MPC · JPL |
| 358626 | 2007 VY_{153} | — | October 18, 2007 | Kitt Peak | Spacewatch | V | 620 m | MPC · JPL |
| 358627 | 2007 VA_{159} | — | November 5, 2007 | Kitt Peak | Spacewatch | (1547) | 1.5 km | MPC · JPL |
| 358628 | 2007 VW_{160} | — | November 5, 2007 | Kitt Peak | Spacewatch | · | 1.2 km | MPC · JPL |
| 358629 | 2007 VN_{166} | — | November 5, 2007 | Kitt Peak | Spacewatch | · | 1.1 km | MPC · JPL |
| 358630 | 2007 VB_{168} | — | November 5, 2007 | Kitt Peak | Spacewatch | · | 1.6 km | MPC · JPL |
| 358631 | 2007 VA_{179} | — | November 7, 2007 | Mount Lemmon | Mount Lemmon Survey | · | 960 m | MPC · JPL |
| 358632 | 2007 VA_{202} | — | November 5, 2007 | Mount Lemmon | Mount Lemmon Survey | EUN | 1.3 km | MPC · JPL |
| 358633 | 2007 VY_{214} | — | November 9, 2007 | Kitt Peak | Spacewatch | · | 1.4 km | MPC · JPL |
| 358634 | 2007 VX_{230} | — | October 17, 2007 | Mount Lemmon | Mount Lemmon Survey | · | 1.1 km | MPC · JPL |
| 358635 | 2007 VD_{239} | — | November 13, 2007 | Kitt Peak | Spacewatch | · | 1.2 km | MPC · JPL |
| 358636 | 2007 VK_{242} | — | November 12, 2007 | Catalina | CSS | · | 2.3 km | MPC · JPL |
| 358637 | 2007 VC_{252} | — | November 12, 2007 | Catalina | CSS | MIS | 2.6 km | MPC · JPL |
| 358638 | 2007 VT_{264} | — | November 13, 2007 | Kitt Peak | Spacewatch | · | 2.0 km | MPC · JPL |
| 358639 | 2007 VD_{268} | — | November 11, 2007 | Socorro | LINEAR | · | 1.7 km | MPC · JPL |
| 358640 | 2007 VZ_{269} | — | October 24, 2007 | Mount Lemmon | Mount Lemmon Survey | (5) | 1.4 km | MPC · JPL |
| 358641 | 2007 VJ_{270} | — | November 6, 2007 | Kitt Peak | Spacewatch | · | 1.8 km | MPC · JPL |
| 358642 | 2007 VC_{280} | — | October 17, 2007 | Mount Lemmon | Mount Lemmon Survey | · | 1.5 km | MPC · JPL |
| 358643 | 2007 VS_{281} | — | November 14, 2007 | Kitt Peak | Spacewatch | · | 1.6 km | MPC · JPL |
| 358644 | 2007 VZ_{292} | — | October 16, 2007 | Catalina | CSS | BRG | 1.6 km | MPC · JPL |
| 358645 | 2007 VT_{295} | — | October 30, 2007 | Catalina | CSS | DOR | 2.3 km | MPC · JPL |
| 358646 | 2007 VE_{300} | — | November 13, 2007 | Anderson Mesa | LONEOS | · | 1.1 km | MPC · JPL |
| 358647 | 2007 VV_{305} | — | November 5, 2007 | Mount Lemmon | Mount Lemmon Survey | (12739) | 1.7 km | MPC · JPL |
| 358648 | 2007 VO_{306} | — | November 1, 2007 | Kitt Peak | Spacewatch | MRX | 930 m | MPC · JPL |
| 358649 | 2007 VP_{310} | — | November 9, 2007 | Mount Lemmon | Mount Lemmon Survey | · | 2.1 km | MPC · JPL |
| 358650 | 2007 VL_{312} | — | November 2, 2007 | Kitt Peak | Spacewatch | (5) | 1.4 km | MPC · JPL |
| 358651 | 2007 VB_{317} | — | November 14, 2007 | Kitt Peak | Spacewatch | · | 1.5 km | MPC · JPL |
| 358652 | 2007 VO_{318} | — | November 7, 2007 | Kitt Peak | Spacewatch | · | 1.6 km | MPC · JPL |
| 358653 | 2007 VG_{321} | — | November 8, 2007 | Catalina | CSS | EUN | 1.1 km | MPC · JPL |
| 358654 | 2007 VF_{323} | — | November 2, 2007 | Kitt Peak | Spacewatch | (194) | 2.1 km | MPC · JPL |
| 358655 | 2007 VF_{325} | — | November 1, 2007 | Kitt Peak | Spacewatch | · | 1.6 km | MPC · JPL |
| 358656 | 2007 VY_{325} | — | November 2, 2007 | Kitt Peak | Spacewatch | · | 1.8 km | MPC · JPL |
| 358657 | 2007 VZ_{327} | — | November 8, 2007 | Catalina | CSS | HNS | 1.2 km | MPC · JPL |
| 358658 | 2007 VJ_{331} | — | August 24, 2007 | Kitt Peak | Spacewatch | · | 1.3 km | MPC · JPL |
| 358659 | 2007 VK_{334} | — | November 13, 2007 | Kitt Peak | Spacewatch | · | 2.3 km | MPC · JPL |
| 358660 | 2007 WY_{2} | — | November 16, 2007 | Mount Lemmon | Mount Lemmon Survey | JUN | 950 m | MPC · JPL |
| 358661 | 2007 WK_{6} | — | November 17, 2007 | Socorro | LINEAR | · | 1.5 km | MPC · JPL |
| 358662 | 2007 WB_{8} | — | November 18, 2007 | Socorro | LINEAR | · | 1.3 km | MPC · JPL |
| 358663 | 2007 WU_{8} | — | November 2, 2007 | Mount Lemmon | Mount Lemmon Survey | · | 4.1 km | MPC · JPL |
| 358664 | 2007 WJ_{9} | — | November 16, 2007 | Mount Lemmon | Mount Lemmon Survey | · | 1.2 km | MPC · JPL |
| 358665 | 2007 WR_{19} | — | November 18, 2007 | Mount Lemmon | Mount Lemmon Survey | · | 1.9 km | MPC · JPL |
| 358666 | 2007 WE_{39} | — | November 19, 2007 | Mount Lemmon | Mount Lemmon Survey | · | 1.5 km | MPC · JPL |
| 358667 | 2007 WV_{60} | — | November 18, 2007 | Mount Lemmon | Mount Lemmon Survey | · | 3.1 km | MPC · JPL |
| 358668 | 2007 XE | — | December 1, 2007 | Bisei SG Center | BATTeRS | · | 1.7 km | MPC · JPL |
| 358669 | 2007 XQ_{4} | — | December 3, 2007 | Catalina | CSS | · | 2.5 km | MPC · JPL |
| 358670 | 2007 XJ_{21} | — | December 10, 2007 | Socorro | LINEAR | · | 1.6 km | MPC · JPL |
| 358671 | 2007 XP_{21} | — | December 10, 2007 | Socorro | LINEAR | · | 7.8 km | MPC · JPL |
| 358672 | 2007 XA_{34} | — | November 2, 2007 | Mount Lemmon | Mount Lemmon Survey | · | 2.3 km | MPC · JPL |
| 358673 | 2007 XG_{51} | — | December 14, 2007 | Mount Lemmon | Mount Lemmon Survey | · | 2.5 km | MPC · JPL |
| 358674 | 2007 XC_{52} | — | December 5, 2007 | Kitt Peak | Spacewatch | NEM | 2.2 km | MPC · JPL |
| 358675 Bente | 2007 YY_{1} | Bente | December 16, 2007 | Uccle | P. De Cat | · | 2.1 km | MPC · JPL |
| 358676 | 2007 YE_{4} | — | October 21, 2007 | Kitt Peak | Spacewatch | · | 1.3 km | MPC · JPL |
| 358677 | 2007 YM_{4} | — | December 16, 2007 | Kitt Peak | Spacewatch | (5) | 1.2 km | MPC · JPL |
| 358678 | 2007 YF_{18} | — | December 16, 2007 | Catalina | CSS | · | 1.9 km | MPC · JPL |
| 358679 | 2007 YF_{20} | — | December 4, 2007 | Kitt Peak | Spacewatch | WIT | 1.2 km | MPC · JPL |
| 358680 | 2007 YS_{20} | — | December 16, 2007 | Kitt Peak | Spacewatch | · | 2.2 km | MPC · JPL |
| 358681 | 2007 YG_{24} | — | December 17, 2007 | Mount Lemmon | Mount Lemmon Survey | · | 2.1 km | MPC · JPL |
| 358682 | 2007 YA_{36} | — | December 30, 2007 | Mount Lemmon | Mount Lemmon Survey | KOR | 1.5 km | MPC · JPL |
| 358683 | 2007 YT_{45} | — | December 30, 2007 | Mount Lemmon | Mount Lemmon Survey | · | 2.1 km | MPC · JPL |
| 358684 | 2007 YH_{51} | — | December 28, 2007 | Kitt Peak | Spacewatch | · | 2.7 km | MPC · JPL |
| 358685 | 2007 YY_{53} | — | December 6, 2007 | Kitt Peak | Spacewatch | · | 1.5 km | MPC · JPL |
| 358686 | 2007 YR_{55} | — | December 31, 2007 | Kitt Peak | Spacewatch | · | 1.9 km | MPC · JPL |
| 358687 | 2007 YD_{61} | — | March 16, 2004 | Kitt Peak | Spacewatch | · | 2.0 km | MPC · JPL |
| 358688 | 2007 YY_{61} | — | December 31, 2007 | Mount Lemmon | Mount Lemmon Survey | · | 2.1 km | MPC · JPL |
| 358689 | 2007 YH_{66} | — | December 30, 2007 | Mount Lemmon | Mount Lemmon Survey | · | 2.0 km | MPC · JPL |
| 358690 | 2008 AM_{5} | — | January 10, 2008 | Mount Lemmon | Mount Lemmon Survey | · | 1.9 km | MPC · JPL |
| 358691 | 2008 AS_{7} | — | January 10, 2008 | Kitt Peak | Spacewatch | · | 1.9 km | MPC · JPL |
| 358692 | 2008 AN_{17} | — | January 10, 2008 | Kitt Peak | Spacewatch | · | 2.1 km | MPC · JPL |
| 358693 | 2008 AQ_{21} | — | January 10, 2008 | Mount Lemmon | Mount Lemmon Survey | NEM | 2.2 km | MPC · JPL |
| 358694 | 2008 AP_{25} | — | January 10, 2008 | Mount Lemmon | Mount Lemmon Survey | KOR | 1.4 km | MPC · JPL |
| 358695 | 2008 AK_{28} | — | January 10, 2008 | Mount Lemmon | Mount Lemmon Survey | · | 5.1 km | MPC · JPL |
| 358696 | 2008 AQ_{30} | — | January 11, 2008 | Desert Eagle | W. K. Y. Yeung | EUN | 1.6 km | MPC · JPL |
| 358697 | 2008 AR_{43} | — | January 10, 2008 | Kitt Peak | Spacewatch | · | 2.3 km | MPC · JPL |
| 358698 | 2008 AS_{44} | — | December 30, 2007 | Mount Lemmon | Mount Lemmon Survey | · | 2.5 km | MPC · JPL |
| 358699 | 2008 AC_{61} | — | January 11, 2008 | Kitt Peak | Spacewatch | · | 1.9 km | MPC · JPL |
| 358700 | 2008 AD_{64} | — | January 11, 2008 | Catalina | CSS | · | 3.8 km | MPC · JPL |

== 358701–358800 ==
back to top

| Designation | | | Discovery | | | Properties | | Ref |
| Permanent | Provisional | Named after | Date | Site | Discoverer(s) | Category | Diam. | Ref |
|---|---|---|---|---|---|---|---|---|
| 358701 | 2008 AU_{64} | — | January 11, 2008 | Mount Lemmon | Mount Lemmon Survey | · | 2.6 km | MPC · JPL |
| 358702 | 2008 AW_{70} | — | January 12, 2008 | Kitt Peak | Spacewatch | · | 2.1 km | MPC · JPL |
| 358703 | 2008 AL_{78} | — | January 12, 2008 | Kitt Peak | Spacewatch | · | 1.9 km | MPC · JPL |
| 358704 | 2008 AW_{80} | — | January 12, 2008 | Kitt Peak | Spacewatch | · | 1.8 km | MPC · JPL |
| 358705 | 2008 AB_{83} | — | January 15, 2008 | Mount Lemmon | Mount Lemmon Survey | MRX | 1.0 km | MPC · JPL |
| 358706 | 2008 AC_{83} | — | January 15, 2008 | Mount Lemmon | Mount Lemmon Survey | · | 2.8 km | MPC · JPL |
| 358707 | 2008 AU_{92} | — | November 18, 2007 | Mount Lemmon | Mount Lemmon Survey | · | 1.7 km | MPC · JPL |
| 358708 | 2008 AK_{94} | — | January 14, 2008 | Kitt Peak | Spacewatch | · | 1.8 km | MPC · JPL |
| 358709 | 2008 AP_{102} | — | December 31, 2007 | Kitt Peak | Spacewatch | · | 1.7 km | MPC · JPL |
| 358710 | 2008 AP_{104} | — | January 15, 2008 | Kitt Peak | Spacewatch | · | 1.7 km | MPC · JPL |
| 358711 | 2008 AL_{106} | — | January 15, 2008 | Mount Lemmon | Mount Lemmon Survey | · | 1.5 km | MPC · JPL |
| 358712 | 2008 AO_{121} | — | January 6, 2008 | Mauna Kea | P. A. Wiegert | · | 3.3 km | MPC · JPL |
| 358713 | 2008 AU_{129} | — | January 5, 2008 | Lulin | LUSS | WAT | 2.1 km | MPC · JPL |
| 358714 | 2008 AF_{135} | — | January 11, 2008 | Catalina | CSS | GEF | 1.8 km | MPC · JPL |
| 358715 | 2008 BV_{5} | — | January 16, 2008 | Kitt Peak | Spacewatch | · | 2.1 km | MPC · JPL |
| 358716 | 2008 BH_{23} | — | January 31, 2008 | Mount Lemmon | Mount Lemmon Survey | · | 2.4 km | MPC · JPL |
| 358717 | 2008 BF_{26} | — | January 30, 2008 | Catalina | CSS | · | 2.1 km | MPC · JPL |
| 358718 | 2008 BV_{28} | — | January 16, 2008 | Kitt Peak | Spacewatch | · | 1.6 km | MPC · JPL |
| 358719 | 2008 BE_{29} | — | January 30, 2008 | Mount Lemmon | Mount Lemmon Survey | · | 1.8 km | MPC · JPL |
| 358720 | 2008 BE_{36} | — | January 30, 2008 | Kitt Peak | Spacewatch | · | 2.6 km | MPC · JPL |
| 358721 | 2008 BE_{45} | — | January 31, 2008 | Catalina | CSS | DOR | 2.5 km | MPC · JPL |
| 358722 | 2008 BK_{46} | — | January 30, 2008 | Kitt Peak | Spacewatch | · | 2.6 km | MPC · JPL |
| 358723 | 2008 BX_{47} | — | January 31, 2008 | Mount Lemmon | Mount Lemmon Survey | · | 2.4 km | MPC · JPL |
| 358724 | 2008 CD_{1} | — | February 3, 2008 | Altschwendt | W. Ries | · | 3.4 km | MPC · JPL |
| 358725 | 2008 CJ_{2} | — | February 1, 2008 | Kitt Peak | Spacewatch | · | 2.8 km | MPC · JPL |
| 358726 | 2008 CP_{14} | — | February 3, 2008 | Kitt Peak | Spacewatch | · | 2.3 km | MPC · JPL |
| 358727 | 2008 CD_{16} | — | February 3, 2008 | Mount Lemmon | Mount Lemmon Survey | NEM | 2.7 km | MPC · JPL |
| 358728 | 2008 CT_{17} | — | February 3, 2008 | Kitt Peak | Spacewatch | · | 2.0 km | MPC · JPL |
| 358729 | 2008 CE_{20} | — | February 6, 2008 | Anderson Mesa | LONEOS | · | 2.4 km | MPC · JPL |
| 358730 | 2008 CT_{20} | — | February 6, 2008 | Suno | Suno | GEF | 1.3 km | MPC · JPL |
| 358731 | 2008 CM_{30} | — | February 2, 2008 | Kitt Peak | Spacewatch | · | 1.8 km | MPC · JPL |
| 358732 | 2008 CD_{33} | — | February 2, 2008 | Kitt Peak | Spacewatch | · | 2.8 km | MPC · JPL |
| 358733 | 2008 CO_{37} | — | February 2, 2008 | Kitt Peak | Spacewatch | KOR | 1.4 km | MPC · JPL |
| 358734 | 2008 CH_{39} | — | February 2, 2008 | Mount Lemmon | Mount Lemmon Survey | · | 2.3 km | MPC · JPL |
| 358735 | 2008 CK_{41} | — | February 2, 2008 | Kitt Peak | Spacewatch | · | 2.7 km | MPC · JPL |
| 358736 | 2008 CZ_{43} | — | February 2, 2008 | Kitt Peak | Spacewatch | · | 2.4 km | MPC · JPL |
| 358737 | 2008 CM_{45} | — | February 2, 2008 | Kitt Peak | Spacewatch | · | 4.6 km | MPC · JPL |
| 358738 | 2008 CW_{55} | — | February 7, 2008 | Kitt Peak | Spacewatch | · | 1.9 km | MPC · JPL |
| 358739 | 2008 CV_{63} | — | August 21, 2006 | Kitt Peak | Spacewatch | MRX | 980 m | MPC · JPL |
| 358740 | 2008 CE_{83} | — | February 7, 2008 | Kitt Peak | Spacewatch | ADE | 2.4 km | MPC · JPL |
| 358741 | 2008 CO_{89} | — | February 7, 2008 | Kitt Peak | Spacewatch | · | 2.3 km | MPC · JPL |
| 358742 | 2008 CC_{93} | — | February 8, 2008 | Mount Lemmon | Mount Lemmon Survey | NEM | 2.6 km | MPC · JPL |
| 358743 | 2008 CO_{100} | — | February 9, 2008 | Kitt Peak | Spacewatch | · | 1.7 km | MPC · JPL |
| 358744 | 2008 CR_{118} | — | February 10, 2008 | Kitt Peak | Spacewatch | APO · PHA | 570 m | MPC · JPL |
| 358745 | 2008 CG_{120} | — | February 6, 2008 | Catalina | CSS | · | 2.3 km | MPC · JPL |
| 358746 | 2008 CQ_{124} | — | February 7, 2008 | Mount Lemmon | Mount Lemmon Survey | · | 2.6 km | MPC · JPL |
| 358747 | 2008 CG_{126} | — | February 8, 2008 | Kitt Peak | Spacewatch | · | 1.8 km | MPC · JPL |
| 358748 | 2008 CG_{130} | — | February 8, 2008 | Kitt Peak | Spacewatch | · | 2.0 km | MPC · JPL |
| 358749 | 2008 CB_{131} | — | February 8, 2008 | Kitt Peak | Spacewatch | AGN | 1.5 km | MPC · JPL |
| 358750 | 2008 CR_{140} | — | February 8, 2008 | Kitt Peak | Spacewatch | · | 2.2 km | MPC · JPL |
| 358751 | 2008 CL_{141} | — | February 8, 2008 | Kitt Peak | Spacewatch | · | 2.3 km | MPC · JPL |
| 358752 | 2008 CF_{151} | — | February 9, 2008 | Kitt Peak | Spacewatch | · | 2.6 km | MPC · JPL |
| 358753 | 2008 CP_{152} | — | February 9, 2008 | Kitt Peak | Spacewatch | EOS | 1.8 km | MPC · JPL |
| 358754 | 2008 CP_{168} | — | February 12, 2008 | Kitt Peak | Spacewatch | · | 3.6 km | MPC · JPL |
| 358755 | 2008 CJ_{176} | — | February 7, 2008 | Socorro | LINEAR | GEF | 1.5 km | MPC · JPL |
| 358756 | 2008 CZ_{176} | — | January 11, 2008 | Lulin | LUSS | · | 3.0 km | MPC · JPL |
| 358757 | 2008 CJ_{183} | — | November 20, 2007 | Mount Lemmon | Mount Lemmon Survey | · | 2.7 km | MPC · JPL |
| 358758 | 2008 CA_{187} | — | July 29, 2005 | Palomar | NEAT | 615 | 2.0 km | MPC · JPL |
| 358759 | 2008 CO_{189} | — | February 14, 2008 | Catalina | CSS | · | 3.4 km | MPC · JPL |
| 358760 | 2008 CQ_{190} | — | February 12, 2008 | Mount Lemmon | Mount Lemmon Survey | H | 550 m | MPC · JPL |
| 358761 | 2008 CL_{196} | — | February 13, 2008 | Mount Lemmon | Mount Lemmon Survey | · | 2.5 km | MPC · JPL |
| 358762 | 2008 CH_{206} | — | February 8, 2008 | Kitt Peak | Spacewatch | · | 1.8 km | MPC · JPL |
| 358763 | 2008 CJ_{206} | — | February 8, 2008 | Kitt Peak | Spacewatch | EOS | 1.9 km | MPC · JPL |
| 358764 | 2008 CW_{211} | — | February 7, 2008 | Kitt Peak | Spacewatch | · | 2.5 km | MPC · JPL |
| 358765 | 2008 CW_{215} | — | February 14, 2008 | Mount Lemmon | Mount Lemmon Survey | · | 3.8 km | MPC · JPL |
| 358766 | 2008 DF_{4} | — | February 27, 2008 | Piszkéstető | K. Sárneczky | · | 2.0 km | MPC · JPL |
| 358767 | 2008 DB_{7} | — | February 24, 2008 | Kitt Peak | Spacewatch | · | 2.3 km | MPC · JPL |
| 358768 | 2008 DH_{9} | — | February 25, 2008 | Kitt Peak | Spacewatch | · | 2.3 km | MPC · JPL |
| 358769 | 2008 DR_{13} | — | February 26, 2008 | Mount Lemmon | Mount Lemmon Survey | · | 3.7 km | MPC · JPL |
| 358770 | 2008 DD_{18} | — | February 26, 2008 | Mount Lemmon | Mount Lemmon Survey | EOS | 2.2 km | MPC · JPL |
| 358771 | 2008 DG_{18} | — | October 18, 2007 | Mount Lemmon | Mount Lemmon Survey | · | 2.4 km | MPC · JPL |
| 358772 | 2008 DJ_{28} | — | February 25, 2008 | Mount Lemmon | Mount Lemmon Survey | AGN | 1.1 km | MPC · JPL |
| 358773 | 2008 DG_{34} | — | February 27, 2008 | Kitt Peak | Spacewatch | · | 2.4 km | MPC · JPL |
| 358774 | 2008 DK_{38} | — | February 27, 2008 | Kitt Peak | Spacewatch | · | 2.3 km | MPC · JPL |
| 358775 | 2008 DJ_{43} | — | February 28, 2008 | Kitt Peak | Spacewatch | · | 2.1 km | MPC · JPL |
| 358776 | 2008 DW_{43} | — | February 28, 2008 | Mount Lemmon | Mount Lemmon Survey | · | 2.0 km | MPC · JPL |
| 358777 | 2008 DG_{56} | — | February 8, 2008 | Kitt Peak | Spacewatch | · | 4.5 km | MPC · JPL |
| 358778 | 2008 DF_{58} | — | February 29, 2008 | Catalina | CSS | · | 2.8 km | MPC · JPL |
| 358779 | 2008 DA_{63} | — | February 28, 2008 | Mount Lemmon | Mount Lemmon Survey | · | 1.8 km | MPC · JPL |
| 358780 | 2008 DF_{63} | — | February 28, 2008 | Mount Lemmon | Mount Lemmon Survey | · | 1.8 km | MPC · JPL |
| 358781 | 2008 DB_{82} | — | February 28, 2008 | Kitt Peak | Spacewatch | · | 3.0 km | MPC · JPL |
| 358782 | 2008 DA_{83} | — | February 28, 2008 | Mount Lemmon | Mount Lemmon Survey | · | 1.7 km | MPC · JPL |
| 358783 | 2008 DD_{83} | — | February 28, 2008 | Kitt Peak | Spacewatch | EOS | 2.1 km | MPC · JPL |
| 358784 | 2008 DX_{83} | — | February 28, 2008 | Kitt Peak | Spacewatch | · | 3.2 km | MPC · JPL |
| 358785 | 2008 DZ_{84} | — | February 28, 2008 | Kitt Peak | Spacewatch | · | 2.7 km | MPC · JPL |
| 358786 | 2008 DW_{88} | — | February 27, 2008 | Kitt Peak | Spacewatch | H | 610 m | MPC · JPL |
| 358787 | 2008 EL_{5} | — | August 30, 2005 | Kitt Peak | Spacewatch | KOR | 1.6 km | MPC · JPL |
| 358788 | 2008 EJ_{10} | — | March 1, 2008 | Kitt Peak | Spacewatch | · | 2.1 km | MPC · JPL |
| 358789 | 2008 EQ_{10} | — | March 1, 2008 | Kitt Peak | Spacewatch | · | 2.6 km | MPC · JPL |
| 358790 | 2008 EG_{16} | — | March 1, 2008 | Kitt Peak | Spacewatch | EOS | 2.1 km | MPC · JPL |
| 358791 | 2008 EV_{16} | — | March 1, 2008 | Kitt Peak | Spacewatch | · | 1.9 km | MPC · JPL |
| 358792 | 2008 EH_{20} | — | March 2, 2008 | Kitt Peak | Spacewatch | · | 3.4 km | MPC · JPL |
| 358793 | 2008 EE_{25} | — | March 3, 2008 | Purple Mountain | PMO NEO Survey Program | · | 2.4 km | MPC · JPL |
| 358794 | 2008 EK_{25} | — | January 11, 2002 | Kitt Peak | Spacewatch | · | 2.8 km | MPC · JPL |
| 358795 | 2008 EL_{44} | — | March 5, 2008 | Kitt Peak | Spacewatch | · | 2.1 km | MPC · JPL |
| 358796 | 2008 EK_{45} | — | March 5, 2008 | Kitt Peak | Spacewatch | EMA | 3.8 km | MPC · JPL |
| 358797 | 2008 EK_{51} | — | March 6, 2008 | Kitt Peak | Spacewatch | · | 2.3 km | MPC · JPL |
| 358798 | 2008 EW_{51} | — | March 6, 2008 | Mount Lemmon | Mount Lemmon Survey | · | 2.2 km | MPC · JPL |
| 358799 | 2008 EZ_{54} | — | March 6, 2008 | Kitt Peak | Spacewatch | · | 2.6 km | MPC · JPL |
| 358800 | 2008 EX_{56} | — | March 7, 2008 | Catalina | CSS | · | 1.7 km | MPC · JPL |

== 358801–358900 ==
back to top

| Designation | | | Discovery | | | Properties | | Ref |
| Permanent | Provisional | Named after | Date | Site | Discoverer(s) | Category | Diam. | Ref |
|---|---|---|---|---|---|---|---|---|
| 358801 | 2008 EV_{58} | — | August 28, 2005 | Kitt Peak | Spacewatch | KOR | 1.6 km | MPC · JPL |
| 358802 | 2008 EA_{62} | — | March 9, 2008 | Mount Lemmon | Mount Lemmon Survey | · | 2.3 km | MPC · JPL |
| 358803 | 2008 EO_{72} | — | January 11, 2008 | Mount Lemmon | Mount Lemmon Survey | · | 3.0 km | MPC · JPL |
| 358804 | 2008 EB_{77} | — | March 7, 2008 | Kitt Peak | Spacewatch | · | 2.5 km | MPC · JPL |
| 358805 | 2008 EA_{79} | — | March 8, 2008 | Mount Lemmon | Mount Lemmon Survey | · | 2.4 km | MPC · JPL |
| 358806 | 2008 EL_{79} | — | March 8, 2008 | Catalina | CSS | · | 2.7 km | MPC · JPL |
| 358807 | 2008 ED_{80} | — | February 7, 2008 | Mount Lemmon | Mount Lemmon Survey | · | 2.2 km | MPC · JPL |
| 358808 | 2008 EZ_{80} | — | March 10, 2008 | Kitt Peak | Spacewatch | · | 2.3 km | MPC · JPL |
| 358809 | 2008 EF_{83} | — | March 8, 2008 | Socorro | LINEAR | EOS | 2.8 km | MPC · JPL |
| 358810 | 2008 EU_{90} | — | April 28, 2003 | Anderson Mesa | LONEOS | · | 4.0 km | MPC · JPL |
| 358811 | 2008 EZ_{110} | — | March 8, 2008 | Kitt Peak | Spacewatch | · | 2.5 km | MPC · JPL |
| 358812 | 2008 EP_{112} | — | March 8, 2008 | Kitt Peak | Spacewatch | EOS | 1.9 km | MPC · JPL |
| 358813 | 2008 EJ_{116} | — | March 8, 2008 | Kitt Peak | Spacewatch | · | 1.6 km | MPC · JPL |
| 358814 | 2008 EO_{118} | — | March 9, 2008 | Mount Lemmon | Mount Lemmon Survey | · | 2.0 km | MPC · JPL |
| 358815 | 2008 ER_{121} | — | September 11, 2005 | Kitt Peak | Spacewatch | · | 2.8 km | MPC · JPL |
| 358816 | 2008 EU_{122} | — | February 28, 2008 | Kitt Peak | Spacewatch | EOS | 2.1 km | MPC · JPL |
| 358817 | 2008 ES_{123} | — | March 10, 2008 | Kitt Peak | Spacewatch | · | 1.9 km | MPC · JPL |
| 358818 | 2008 ES_{124} | — | March 10, 2008 | Mount Lemmon | Mount Lemmon Survey | · | 2.0 km | MPC · JPL |
| 358819 | 2008 EV_{125} | — | March 10, 2008 | Kitt Peak | Spacewatch | · | 2.2 km | MPC · JPL |
| 358820 | 2008 EZ_{142} | — | March 13, 2008 | Catalina | CSS | · | 2.6 km | MPC · JPL |
| 358821 | 2008 EC_{143} | — | March 6, 2008 | Mount Lemmon | Mount Lemmon Survey | · | 3.1 km | MPC · JPL |
| 358822 | 2008 EV_{148} | — | March 2, 2008 | Kitt Peak | Spacewatch | · | 2.5 km | MPC · JPL |
| 358823 | 2008 EZ_{150} | — | March 5, 2008 | Kitt Peak | Spacewatch | · | 2.5 km | MPC · JPL |
| 358824 | 2008 EQ_{152} | — | March 10, 2008 | Mount Lemmon | Mount Lemmon Survey | EOS | 2.1 km | MPC · JPL |
| 358825 | 2008 EM_{153} | — | March 12, 2008 | Kitt Peak | Spacewatch | · | 1.4 km | MPC · JPL |
| 358826 | 2008 EV_{153} | — | March 13, 2008 | Kitt Peak | Spacewatch | · | 1.8 km | MPC · JPL |
| 358827 | 2008 EH_{156} | — | March 1, 2008 | Kitt Peak | Spacewatch | · | 3.1 km | MPC · JPL |
| 358828 | 2008 EY_{158} | — | March 12, 2008 | Kitt Peak | Spacewatch | · | 1.8 km | MPC · JPL |
| 358829 | 2008 EW_{164} | — | March 1, 2008 | Kitt Peak | Spacewatch | · | 2.0 km | MPC · JPL |
| 358830 | 2008 EZ_{164} | — | March 1, 2008 | Kitt Peak | Spacewatch | KOR | 1.5 km | MPC · JPL |
| 358831 | 2008 EE_{165} | — | March 2, 2008 | Kitt Peak | Spacewatch | · | 2.8 km | MPC · JPL |
| 358832 | 2008 EN_{165} | — | March 2, 2008 | Kitt Peak | Spacewatch | · | 2.5 km | MPC · JPL |
| 358833 | 2008 ED_{168} | — | March 10, 2008 | Kitt Peak | Spacewatch | EOS | 4.8 km | MPC · JPL |
| 358834 | 2008 FC_{3} | — | March 25, 2008 | Kitt Peak | Spacewatch | · | 2.3 km | MPC · JPL |
| 358835 | 2008 FL_{10} | — | March 26, 2008 | Kitt Peak | Spacewatch | · | 2.3 km | MPC · JPL |
| 358836 | 2008 FW_{18} | — | March 27, 2008 | Mount Lemmon | Mount Lemmon Survey | · | 2.3 km | MPC · JPL |
| 358837 | 2008 FA_{26} | — | March 27, 2008 | Kitt Peak | Spacewatch | · | 3.7 km | MPC · JPL |
| 358838 | 2008 FC_{27} | — | March 27, 2008 | Kitt Peak | Spacewatch | · | 4.2 km | MPC · JPL |
| 358839 | 2008 FP_{28} | — | March 28, 2008 | Kitt Peak | Spacewatch | · | 2.4 km | MPC · JPL |
| 358840 | 2008 FF_{31} | — | March 28, 2008 | Mount Lemmon | Mount Lemmon Survey | AGN | 1.1 km | MPC · JPL |
| 358841 | 2008 FD_{53} | — | March 28, 2008 | Mount Lemmon | Mount Lemmon Survey | · | 2.8 km | MPC · JPL |
| 358842 | 2008 FD_{54} | — | March 28, 2008 | Mount Lemmon | Mount Lemmon Survey | · | 2.3 km | MPC · JPL |
| 358843 | 2008 FN_{56} | — | March 28, 2008 | Kitt Peak | Spacewatch | · | 2.5 km | MPC · JPL |
| 358844 | 2008 FY_{57} | — | March 28, 2008 | Mount Lemmon | Mount Lemmon Survey | TIR | 3.5 km | MPC · JPL |
| 358845 | 2008 FV_{61} | — | March 28, 2008 | Mount Lemmon | Mount Lemmon Survey | KOR | 1.4 km | MPC · JPL |
| 358846 | 2008 FL_{62} | — | March 27, 2008 | Kitt Peak | Spacewatch | KOR | 1.3 km | MPC · JPL |
| 358847 | 2008 FS_{62} | — | March 27, 2008 | Kitt Peak | Spacewatch | · | 1.5 km | MPC · JPL |
| 358848 | 2008 FW_{63} | — | March 27, 2008 | Lulin | LUSS | · | 3.0 km | MPC · JPL |
| 358849 | 2008 FG_{64} | — | March 28, 2008 | Kitt Peak | Spacewatch | H | 530 m | MPC · JPL |
| 358850 | 2008 FM_{65} | — | March 28, 2008 | Kitt Peak | Spacewatch | · | 3.1 km | MPC · JPL |
| 358851 | 2008 FR_{73} | — | March 30, 2008 | Kitt Peak | Spacewatch | EOS | 1.9 km | MPC · JPL |
| 358852 | 2008 FX_{75} | — | March 30, 2008 | Socorro | LINEAR | · | 2.6 km | MPC · JPL |
| 358853 | 2008 FC_{77} | — | March 27, 2008 | Mount Lemmon | Mount Lemmon Survey | · | 1.8 km | MPC · JPL |
| 358854 | 2008 FZ_{77} | — | March 27, 2008 | Mount Lemmon | Mount Lemmon Survey | · | 3.4 km | MPC · JPL |
| 358855 | 2008 FS_{81} | — | March 27, 2008 | Mount Lemmon | Mount Lemmon Survey | · | 1.6 km | MPC · JPL |
| 358856 | 2008 FR_{85} | — | March 28, 2008 | Mount Lemmon | Mount Lemmon Survey | · | 2.0 km | MPC · JPL |
| 358857 | 2008 FT_{87} | — | March 28, 2008 | Mount Lemmon | Mount Lemmon Survey | · | 3.0 km | MPC · JPL |
| 358858 | 2008 FZ_{88} | — | March 28, 2008 | Mount Lemmon | Mount Lemmon Survey | · | 2.2 km | MPC · JPL |
| 358859 | 2008 FN_{100} | — | March 30, 2008 | Kitt Peak | Spacewatch | · | 2.6 km | MPC · JPL |
| 358860 | 2008 FY_{101} | — | March 30, 2008 | Kitt Peak | Spacewatch | · | 2.7 km | MPC · JPL |
| 358861 | 2008 FC_{102} | — | March 30, 2008 | Kitt Peak | Spacewatch | · | 4.2 km | MPC · JPL |
| 358862 | 2008 FN_{103} | — | March 30, 2008 | Kitt Peak | Spacewatch | · | 3.1 km | MPC · JPL |
| 358863 | 2008 FY_{103} | — | March 30, 2008 | Kitt Peak | Spacewatch | EOS | 1.9 km | MPC · JPL |
| 358864 | 2008 FS_{105} | — | March 31, 2008 | Kitt Peak | Spacewatch | · | 2.4 km | MPC · JPL |
| 358865 | 2008 FF_{107} | — | March 31, 2008 | Kitt Peak | Spacewatch | · | 2.0 km | MPC · JPL |
| 358866 | 2008 FG_{107} | — | March 31, 2008 | Kitt Peak | Spacewatch | · | 2.8 km | MPC · JPL |
| 358867 | 2008 FY_{109} | — | March 31, 2008 | Mount Lemmon | Mount Lemmon Survey | · | 2.4 km | MPC · JPL |
| 358868 | 2008 FE_{111} | — | February 13, 2008 | Mount Lemmon | Mount Lemmon Survey | · | 4.0 km | MPC · JPL |
| 358869 | 2008 FQ_{116} | — | March 31, 2008 | Kitt Peak | Spacewatch | VER | 3.3 km | MPC · JPL |
| 358870 | 2008 FE_{119} | — | March 31, 2008 | Mount Lemmon | Mount Lemmon Survey | · | 3.4 km | MPC · JPL |
| 358871 | 2008 FG_{123} | — | March 28, 2008 | Mount Lemmon | Mount Lemmon Survey | · | 4.4 km | MPC · JPL |
| 358872 | 2008 FJ_{123} | — | March 28, 2008 | Kitt Peak | Spacewatch | · | 2.6 km | MPC · JPL |
| 358873 | 2008 FR_{123} | — | March 29, 2008 | Kitt Peak | Spacewatch | · | 4.0 km | MPC · JPL |
| 358874 | 2008 FM_{125} | — | March 31, 2008 | Kitt Peak | Spacewatch | · | 3.2 km | MPC · JPL |
| 358875 | 2008 FR_{126} | — | March 29, 2008 | Kitt Peak | Spacewatch | · | 3.3 km | MPC · JPL |
| 358876 | 2008 FU_{126} | — | March 30, 2008 | Kitt Peak | Spacewatch | · | 2.0 km | MPC · JPL |
| 358877 | 2008 FB_{127} | — | March 28, 2008 | Kitt Peak | Spacewatch | · | 4.5 km | MPC · JPL |
| 358878 | 2008 FW_{127} | — | October 6, 2000 | Kitt Peak | Spacewatch | · | 2.0 km | MPC · JPL |
| 358879 | 2008 FW_{133} | — | March 28, 2008 | Mount Lemmon | Mount Lemmon Survey | · | 2.5 km | MPC · JPL |
| 358880 | 2008 FK_{137} | — | March 30, 2008 | Kitt Peak | Spacewatch | · | 2.8 km | MPC · JPL |
| 358881 | 2008 GK_{4} | — | April 8, 2008 | Mayhill | Lowe, A. | · | 3.8 km | MPC · JPL |
| 358882 | 2008 GL_{11} | — | April 1, 2008 | Kitt Peak | Spacewatch | · | 5.0 km | MPC · JPL |
| 358883 | 2008 GO_{17} | — | April 4, 2008 | Kitt Peak | Spacewatch | KOR | 1.7 km | MPC · JPL |
| 358884 | 2008 GJ_{19} | — | April 4, 2008 | Mount Lemmon | Mount Lemmon Survey | · | 2.9 km | MPC · JPL |
| 358885 | 2008 GK_{21} | — | October 30, 2005 | Kitt Peak | Spacewatch | · | 3.5 km | MPC · JPL |
| 358886 | 2008 GX_{25} | — | April 1, 2008 | Mount Lemmon | Mount Lemmon Survey | · | 2.3 km | MPC · JPL |
| 358887 | 2008 GB_{28} | — | April 3, 2008 | Kitt Peak | Spacewatch | · | 3.1 km | MPC · JPL |
| 358888 | 2008 GE_{33} | — | April 3, 2008 | Mount Lemmon | Mount Lemmon Survey | · | 2.9 km | MPC · JPL |
| 358889 | 2008 GL_{36} | — | April 3, 2008 | Kitt Peak | Spacewatch | · | 3.8 km | MPC · JPL |
| 358890 | 2008 GL_{37} | — | April 3, 2008 | Kitt Peak | Spacewatch | · | 3.5 km | MPC · JPL |
| 358891 | 2008 GT_{38} | — | April 3, 2008 | Mount Lemmon | Mount Lemmon Survey | · | 3.0 km | MPC · JPL |
| 358892 | 2008 GA_{41} | — | April 4, 2008 | Kitt Peak | Spacewatch | TIR | 3.8 km | MPC · JPL |
| 358893 | 2008 GL_{41} | — | April 4, 2008 | Kitt Peak | Spacewatch | HYG | 2.6 km | MPC · JPL |
| 358894 Demetrescu | 2008 GD_{44} | Demetrescu | April 4, 2008 | Kitt Peak | Spacewatch | EOS | 2.1 km | MPC · JPL |
| 358895 | 2008 GN_{46} | — | April 4, 2008 | Kitt Peak | Spacewatch | · | 2.6 km | MPC · JPL |
| 358896 | 2008 GD_{47} | — | March 6, 2008 | Mount Lemmon | Mount Lemmon Survey | · | 3.8 km | MPC · JPL |
| 358897 | 2008 GA_{50} | — | April 5, 2008 | Kitt Peak | Spacewatch | · | 3.7 km | MPC · JPL |
| 358898 | 2008 GC_{50} | — | April 5, 2008 | Kitt Peak | Spacewatch | · | 2.6 km | MPC · JPL |
| 358899 | 2008 GM_{52} | — | March 10, 2008 | Kitt Peak | Spacewatch | · | 2.0 km | MPC · JPL |
| 358900 | 2008 GY_{56} | — | April 5, 2008 | Mount Lemmon | Mount Lemmon Survey | · | 1.9 km | MPC · JPL |

== 358901–359000 ==
back to top

| Designation | | | Discovery | | | Properties | | Ref |
| Permanent | Provisional | Named after | Date | Site | Discoverer(s) | Category | Diam. | Ref |
|---|---|---|---|---|---|---|---|---|
| 358901 | 2008 GZ_{62} | — | March 12, 2008 | Kitt Peak | Spacewatch | · | 2.2 km | MPC · JPL |
| 358902 | 2008 GR_{80} | — | March 10, 2008 | Mount Lemmon | Mount Lemmon Survey | EOS | 1.8 km | MPC · JPL |
| 358903 | 2008 GG_{88} | — | March 4, 2008 | Mount Lemmon | Mount Lemmon Survey | · | 3.2 km | MPC · JPL |
| 358904 | 2008 GJ_{89} | — | April 6, 2008 | Kitt Peak | Spacewatch | · | 2.5 km | MPC · JPL |
| 358905 | 2008 GW_{93} | — | December 13, 2006 | Mount Lemmon | Mount Lemmon Survey | · | 1.8 km | MPC · JPL |
| 358906 | 2008 GQ_{94} | — | April 7, 2008 | Mount Lemmon | Mount Lemmon Survey | · | 3.2 km | MPC · JPL |
| 358907 | 2008 GH_{96} | — | April 8, 2008 | Kitt Peak | Spacewatch | · | 2.2 km | MPC · JPL |
| 358908 | 2008 GG_{100} | — | April 9, 2008 | Kitt Peak | Spacewatch | THM | 2.4 km | MPC · JPL |
| 358909 | 2008 GT_{100} | — | April 9, 2008 | Kitt Peak | Spacewatch | EOS | 1.6 km | MPC · JPL |
| 358910 | 2008 GD_{103} | — | April 10, 2008 | Kitt Peak | Spacewatch | · | 3.4 km | MPC · JPL |
| 358911 | 2008 GZ_{114} | — | April 11, 2008 | Kitt Peak | Spacewatch | · | 1.7 km | MPC · JPL |
| 358912 | 2008 GR_{122} | — | April 13, 2008 | Kitt Peak | Spacewatch | · | 3.0 km | MPC · JPL |
| 358913 | 2008 GB_{128} | — | April 13, 2008 | Modra | Gajdoš, S., Világi, J. | · | 2.4 km | MPC · JPL |
| 358914 | 2008 GT_{128} | — | April 15, 2008 | Catalina | CSS | EUP | 6.9 km | MPC · JPL |
| 358915 | 2008 GT_{129} | — | April 4, 2008 | Mount Lemmon | Mount Lemmon Survey | · | 2.7 km | MPC · JPL |
| 358916 | 2008 GX_{130} | — | April 7, 2008 | Kitt Peak | Spacewatch | · | 2.5 km | MPC · JPL |
| 358917 | 2008 GH_{131} | — | April 9, 2008 | Kitt Peak | Spacewatch | · | 3.4 km | MPC · JPL |
| 358918 | 2008 GQ_{139} | — | April 6, 2008 | Kitt Peak | Spacewatch | THM | 2.3 km | MPC · JPL |
| 358919 | 2008 HK_{1} | — | April 6, 2008 | Mount Lemmon | Mount Lemmon Survey | VER | 3.4 km | MPC · JPL |
| 358920 | 2008 HD_{8} | — | April 3, 2008 | Mount Lemmon | Mount Lemmon Survey | EOS | 2.1 km | MPC · JPL |
| 358921 | 2008 HU_{9} | — | April 24, 2008 | Mount Lemmon | Mount Lemmon Survey | EOS | 2.2 km | MPC · JPL |
| 358922 | 2008 HT_{10} | — | April 24, 2008 | Kitt Peak | Spacewatch | · | 3.1 km | MPC · JPL |
| 358923 | 2008 HA_{12} | — | February 21, 2002 | Kitt Peak | Spacewatch | HYG | 4.0 km | MPC · JPL |
| 358924 | 2008 HR_{15} | — | April 25, 2008 | Kitt Peak | Spacewatch | · | 3.4 km | MPC · JPL |
| 358925 | 2008 HJ_{16} | — | April 25, 2008 | Kitt Peak | Spacewatch | · | 2.7 km | MPC · JPL |
| 358926 | 2008 HV_{17} | — | April 26, 2008 | Kitt Peak | Spacewatch | · | 2.9 km | MPC · JPL |
| 358927 | 2008 HR_{25} | — | April 14, 2008 | Mount Lemmon | Mount Lemmon Survey | THM | 1.9 km | MPC · JPL |
| 358928 | 2008 HV_{33} | — | April 26, 2008 | Kitt Peak | Spacewatch | TIR | 3.9 km | MPC · JPL |
| 358929 | 2008 HX_{34} | — | April 27, 2008 | Kitt Peak | Spacewatch | · | 3.5 km | MPC · JPL |
| 358930 | 2008 HW_{36} | — | April 30, 2008 | Kitt Peak | Spacewatch | · | 3.3 km | MPC · JPL |
| 358931 | 2008 HM_{43} | — | April 27, 2008 | Mount Lemmon | Mount Lemmon Survey | · | 2.8 km | MPC · JPL |
| 358932 | 2008 HL_{46} | — | April 28, 2008 | Kitt Peak | Spacewatch | · | 3.3 km | MPC · JPL |
| 358933 | 2008 HD_{50} | — | April 29, 2008 | Kitt Peak | Spacewatch | THM | 2.3 km | MPC · JPL |
| 358934 | 2008 HJ_{53} | — | April 29, 2008 | Kitt Peak | Spacewatch | VER | 2.7 km | MPC · JPL |
| 358935 | 2008 HO_{53} | — | April 29, 2008 | Kitt Peak | Spacewatch | EOS | 2.3 km | MPC · JPL |
| 358936 | 2008 HB_{56} | — | April 29, 2008 | Kitt Peak | Spacewatch | TIR | 3.3 km | MPC · JPL |
| 358937 | 2008 HT_{60} | — | April 29, 2008 | Mount Lemmon | Mount Lemmon Survey | · | 3.8 km | MPC · JPL |
| 358938 | 2008 HL_{61} | — | April 30, 2008 | Mount Lemmon | Mount Lemmon Survey | · | 2.7 km | MPC · JPL |
| 358939 | 2008 HS_{62} | — | April 26, 2008 | Catalina | CSS | T_{j} (2.99) · EUP | 5.5 km | MPC · JPL |
| 358940 | 2008 JS_{3} | — | May 1, 2008 | Kitt Peak | Spacewatch | · | 3.2 km | MPC · JPL |
| 358941 | 2008 JH_{6} | — | May 2, 2008 | Kitt Peak | Spacewatch | · | 3.2 km | MPC · JPL |
| 358942 | 2008 JM_{6} | — | May 2, 2008 | Kitt Peak | Spacewatch | EOS | 2.4 km | MPC · JPL |
| 358943 | 2008 JS_{9} | — | May 3, 2008 | Kitt Peak | Spacewatch | · | 1.8 km | MPC · JPL |
| 358944 | 2008 JR_{22} | — | May 7, 2008 | Kitt Peak | Spacewatch | · | 4.0 km | MPC · JPL |
| 358945 | 2008 JN_{25} | — | May 6, 2008 | Kitt Peak | Spacewatch | · | 3.7 km | MPC · JPL |
| 358946 | 2008 JY_{26} | — | May 7, 2008 | Kitt Peak | Spacewatch | · | 2.7 km | MPC · JPL |
| 358947 | 2008 JS_{27} | — | May 8, 2008 | Kitt Peak | Spacewatch | HYG | 2.3 km | MPC · JPL |
| 358948 | 2008 JA_{29} | — | May 11, 2008 | Mount Lemmon | Mount Lemmon Survey | · | 2.7 km | MPC · JPL |
| 358949 | 2008 JD_{29} | — | May 11, 2008 | Catalina | CSS | · | 3.6 km | MPC · JPL |
| 358950 | 2008 JD_{31} | — | May 5, 2008 | Catalina | CSS | · | 2.1 km | MPC · JPL |
| 358951 | 2008 KJ_{3} | — | May 27, 2008 | Kitt Peak | Spacewatch | · | 3.0 km | MPC · JPL |
| 358952 | 2008 KR_{7} | — | May 27, 2008 | Mount Lemmon | Mount Lemmon Survey | · | 3.3 km | MPC · JPL |
| 358953 | 2008 KE_{8} | — | May 27, 2008 | Kitt Peak | Spacewatch | · | 3.0 km | MPC · JPL |
| 358954 | 2008 KE_{9} | — | May 3, 2008 | Kitt Peak | Spacewatch | · | 3.3 km | MPC · JPL |
| 358955 | 2008 KS_{26} | — | May 29, 2008 | Kitt Peak | Spacewatch | · | 2.9 km | MPC · JPL |
| 358956 | 2008 KJ_{28} | — | March 28, 2008 | Mount Lemmon | Mount Lemmon Survey | · | 3.6 km | MPC · JPL |
| 358957 | 2008 KL_{36} | — | May 29, 2008 | Mount Lemmon | Mount Lemmon Survey | · | 2.8 km | MPC · JPL |
| 358958 | 2008 KP_{36} | — | May 29, 2008 | Kitt Peak | Spacewatch | · | 3.0 km | MPC · JPL |
| 358959 | 2008 KF_{42} | — | May 31, 2008 | Kitt Peak | Spacewatch | VER | 4.6 km | MPC · JPL |
| 358960 | 2008 LS_{1} | — | June 2, 2008 | Mount Lemmon | Mount Lemmon Survey | · | 3.3 km | MPC · JPL |
| 358961 | 2008 LQ_{14} | — | June 8, 2008 | Kitt Peak | Spacewatch | · | 3.6 km | MPC · JPL |
| 358962 | 2008 LA_{16} | — | February 20, 2002 | Kitt Peak | Spacewatch | EOS | 4.4 km | MPC · JPL |
| 358963 | 2008 NA_{1} | — | July 2, 2008 | La Sagra | OAM | · | 5.5 km | MPC · JPL |
| 358964 | 2008 QD_{14} | — | August 21, 2008 | Kitt Peak | Spacewatch | · | 550 m | MPC · JPL |
| 358965 | 2008 RU_{9} | — | September 3, 2008 | Kitt Peak | Spacewatch | · | 720 m | MPC · JPL |
| 358966 | 2008 RY_{16} | — | September 4, 2008 | Kitt Peak | Spacewatch | L4 | 7.6 km | MPC · JPL |
| 358967 | 2008 RE_{26} | — | September 8, 2008 | Dauban | Kugel, F. | · | 660 m | MPC · JPL |
| 358968 | 2008 RM_{94} | — | September 6, 2008 | Kitt Peak | Spacewatch | L4 | 7.7 km | MPC · JPL |
| 358969 | 2008 RA_{98} | — | September 7, 2008 | Mount Lemmon | Mount Lemmon Survey | · | 900 m | MPC · JPL |
| 358970 | 2008 RD_{101} | — | September 6, 2008 | Mount Lemmon | Mount Lemmon Survey | · | 720 m | MPC · JPL |
| 358971 | 2008 RQ_{112} | — | September 5, 2008 | Kitt Peak | Spacewatch | L4 | 8.5 km | MPC · JPL |
| 358972 | 2008 RY_{126} | — | September 5, 2008 | Kitt Peak | Spacewatch | 3:2 | 7.9 km | MPC · JPL |
| 358973 | 2008 RS_{146} | — | September 6, 2008 | Mount Lemmon | Mount Lemmon Survey | · | 1.1 km | MPC · JPL |
| 358974 | 2008 SN_{7} | — | September 23, 2008 | Goodricke-Pigott | R. A. Tucker | · | 780 m | MPC · JPL |
| 358975 | 2008 SY_{16} | — | September 19, 2008 | Kitt Peak | Spacewatch | L4 | 7.9 km | MPC · JPL |
| 358976 | 2008 SZ_{38} | — | September 20, 2008 | Kitt Peak | Spacewatch | L4 | 12 km | MPC · JPL |
| 358977 | 2008 SA_{77} | — | September 23, 2008 | Mount Lemmon | Mount Lemmon Survey | L4 | 8.6 km | MPC · JPL |
| 358978 | 2008 SO_{83} | — | September 27, 2008 | Altschwendt | W. Ries | · | 680 m | MPC · JPL |
| 358979 | 2008 SK_{88} | — | September 20, 2008 | Mount Lemmon | Mount Lemmon Survey | · | 820 m | MPC · JPL |
| 358980 | 2008 SX_{109} | — | September 22, 2008 | Kitt Peak | Spacewatch | MAS | 730 m | MPC · JPL |
| 358981 | 2008 SK_{113} | — | September 8, 2008 | Kitt Peak | Spacewatch | L4 | 8.7 km | MPC · JPL |
| 358982 | 2008 SO_{118} | — | September 22, 2008 | Mount Lemmon | Mount Lemmon Survey | · | 670 m | MPC · JPL |
| 358983 | 2008 SZ_{124} | — | September 22, 2008 | Mount Lemmon | Mount Lemmon Survey | · | 710 m | MPC · JPL |
| 358984 | 2008 SK_{127} | — | September 22, 2008 | Kitt Peak | Spacewatch | · | 550 m | MPC · JPL |
| 358985 | 2008 SB_{140} | — | September 24, 2008 | Kitt Peak | Spacewatch | · | 820 m | MPC · JPL |
| 358986 | 2008 SM_{155} | — | September 23, 2008 | Socorro | LINEAR | · | 800 m | MPC · JPL |
| 358987 | 2008 SW_{165} | — | September 3, 2008 | Kitt Peak | Spacewatch | · | 790 m | MPC · JPL |
| 358988 | 2008 SC_{216} | — | September 29, 2008 | Mount Lemmon | Mount Lemmon Survey | L4 | 7.4 km | MPC · JPL |
| 358989 | 2008 SG_{229} | — | September 28, 2008 | Mount Lemmon | Mount Lemmon Survey | L4 | 9.6 km | MPC · JPL |
| 358990 | 2008 SF_{255} | — | September 23, 2008 | Mount Lemmon | Mount Lemmon Survey | · | 810 m | MPC · JPL |
| 358991 | 2008 SS_{255} | — | September 25, 2008 | Kitt Peak | Spacewatch | · | 690 m | MPC · JPL |
| 358992 | 2008 SG_{275} | — | September 23, 2008 | Kitt Peak | Spacewatch | L4 | 7.7 km | MPC · JPL |
| 358993 | 2008 SQ_{275} | — | September 23, 2008 | Kitt Peak | Spacewatch | L4 | 7.3 km | MPC · JPL |
| 358994 | 2008 SN_{279} | — | September 22, 2008 | Mount Lemmon | Mount Lemmon Survey | L4 | 8.0 km | MPC · JPL |
| 358995 | 2008 SW_{287} | — | September 23, 2008 | Kitt Peak | Spacewatch | · | 870 m | MPC · JPL |
| 358996 | 2008 SN_{289} | — | September 26, 2008 | Kitt Peak | Spacewatch | · | 600 m | MPC · JPL |
| 358997 | 2008 TQ_{3} | — | October 3, 2008 | Socorro | LINEAR | · | 1.5 km | MPC · JPL |
| 358998 | 2008 TH_{89} | — | October 3, 2008 | Kitt Peak | Spacewatch | · | 630 m | MPC · JPL |
| 358999 | 2008 TC_{94} | — | October 5, 2008 | La Sagra | OAM | · | 670 m | MPC · JPL |
| 359000 | 2008 TP_{108} | — | October 6, 2008 | Mount Lemmon | Mount Lemmon Survey | L4 | 8.9 km | MPC · JPL |

back to top

== See also ==
- Meanings of minor-planet names: 358001–359000
