= Hektor family =

Family of Jupiter trojans

The Hektor family (004) is a small collisional asteroid family of at least 12 known asteroids, named for its largest member, the 225-kilometre (140 mi)-across asteroid 624 Hektor. It lies within the larger dynamical group of Jupiter trojans, a group of asteroids in an orbital resonance with Jupiter such that they stay about 60 degrees ahead of/behind the planet in its orbit at all times in the Lagrange points L4 and L5, with the Hektor family being part of the leading cloud around L4, also known as the Greek camp. All members of the family are dark D-type asteroids with albedos of around 0.03-0.04.

An asteroid family is a group of physically related asteroids usually created by a collision with an original larger asteroid, with the fragments continuing on similar orbits to the original. This is distinct from a dynamical group in that the members of a dynamical group only share similar orbits because of gravitational interactions with planets, which concentrate asteroids in a particular orbital range. Members of the Hektor family are both part of the wider Trojan dynamical group, and fragments of 624 Hektor. The family is considered a non-catastrophic asteroid family because 624 Hektor, its largest member, makes up nearly all of the family's total mass, rather than simply being the largest of a number of fragments each making up a small fraction of the original destroyed asteroid.

The age of the family is very poorly constrained due to the lack of known small members to model, with different methods of analysis suggesting ages of 1-4 billion and 0.1-2.5 billion years.

== Large members ==

- 624 Hektor: 127 (99.6%)
- all other members: 0.519 (0.4%)
Mass distribution of the Hektor family (assuming similar densities)

The 10 brightest Hektor family members
Name	Abs. Mag	Size (km)	proper a (AU)	proper e	proper i
624 Hektor	7.39	225	5.2963	0.054	19.021
(253382) 2003 JG8	12.60	21	5.2879	0.056	18.960
(252159) 2001 CN10	12.61	21	5.2875	0.052	18.994
(191028) 2002 AS168	12.73	20	5.3002	0.056	18.944
(321570) 2009 SE361	13.00	17	5.2859	0.055	18.931
(231623) 2009 SR207	13.08	17	5.2912	0.055	18.949
(325374) 2008 RR85	13.21	16	5.2879	0.055	18.925
(398095) 2009 QJ65	13.35	15	5.2929	0.056	18.931
356217 Clymene	13.65	13	5.2941	0.054	18.951
(356276) 2010 AJ107	13.70	13	5.2886	0.055	18.903
