= List of minor planets: 356001–357000 =

The following is a partial list of minor planets, running from minor-planet number 356001 through 357000, inclusive. The primary data for this and other partial lists is based on JPL's "Small-Body Orbital Elements" and data available from the Minor Planet Center. Critical list information is also provided by the MPC, unless otherwise specified from Lowell Observatory. A detailed description of the table's columns and additional sources are given on the main page including a complete list of every page in this series, and a statistical break-up on the dynamical classification of minor planets.

Also see the summary list of all named bodies in numerical and alphabetical order, and the corresponding naming citations for the number range of this particular list. New namings may only be added to this list after official publication, as the preannouncement of names is condemned by the Working Group for Small Bodies Nomenclature of the International Astronomical Union.

Near-Earth obj.	MBA (inner)	MBA (outer)	Centaur
Mars-crosser	MBA (middle)	Jupiter trojan	Trans-Neptunian obj.
Unclassified

== 356001–356100 ==
Designation			Discovery			Properties		Ref
Permanent	Provisional	Named after	Date	Site	Discoverer(s)	Category	Diam.	Ref
356001	2009 BO_{57}	—	January 20, 2009	Kitt Peak	Spacewatch	NYS	1.5 km	MPC · JPL
356002	2009 BA_{62}	—	January 18, 2009	Mount Lemmon	Mount Lemmon Survey	·	1.1 km	MPC · JPL
356003	2009 BM_{64}	—	January 20, 2009	Kitt Peak	Spacewatch	·	1.4 km	MPC · JPL
356004	2009 BP_{70}	—	January 25, 2009	Catalina	CSS	·	1.5 km	MPC · JPL
356005	2009 BK_{72}	—	January 28, 2009	Dauban	Kugel, F.	·	1.7 km	MPC · JPL
356006	2009 BR_{75}	—	January 24, 2009	Purple Mountain	PMO NEO Survey Program	·	1.2 km	MPC · JPL
356007	2009 BH_{76}	—	January 26, 2009	Catalina	CSS	·	1.3 km	MPC · JPL
356008	2009 BL_{79}	—	January 30, 2009	Socorro	LINEAR	·	1.7 km	MPC · JPL
356009	2009 BD_{95}	—	January 26, 2009	Catalina	CSS	·	2.0 km	MPC · JPL
356010	2009 BX_{101}	—	January 29, 2009	Mount Lemmon	Mount Lemmon Survey	·	2.0 km	MPC · JPL
356011	2009 BZ_{103}	—	January 25, 2009	Kitt Peak	Spacewatch	EUN	1.2 km	MPC · JPL
356012	2009 BQ_{107}	—	January 29, 2009	Kitt Peak	Spacewatch	·	950 m	MPC · JPL
356013	2009 BC_{108}	—	January 29, 2009	Mount Lemmon	Mount Lemmon Survey	·	970 m	MPC · JPL
356014	2009 BO_{110}	—	January 31, 2009	Mount Lemmon	Mount Lemmon Survey	·	1.0 km	MPC · JPL
356015	2009 BF_{111}	—	January 26, 2009	Purple Mountain	PMO NEO Survey Program	·	1.7 km	MPC · JPL
356016	2009 BM_{111}	—	January 28, 2009	Catalina	CSS	·	1.6 km	MPC · JPL
356017	2009 BS_{112}	—	January 31, 2009	Mount Lemmon	Mount Lemmon Survey	·	2.5 km	MPC · JPL
356018	2009 BZ_{112}	—	January 31, 2009	Mount Lemmon	Mount Lemmon Survey	·	1.0 km	MPC · JPL
356019	2009 BX_{116}	—	January 29, 2009	Mount Lemmon	Mount Lemmon Survey	·	1.3 km	MPC · JPL
356020	2009 BY_{122}	—	January 31, 2009	Kitt Peak	Spacewatch	·	1.4 km	MPC · JPL
356021	2009 BL_{134}	—	January 29, 2009	Kitt Peak	Spacewatch	·	1.9 km	MPC · JPL
356022	2009 BS_{136}	—	January 29, 2009	Kitt Peak	Spacewatch	·	1.4 km	MPC · JPL
356023	2009 BH_{140}	—	January 29, 2009	Kitt Peak	Spacewatch	·	1.1 km	MPC · JPL
356024	2009 BG_{145}	—	January 30, 2009	Kitt Peak	Spacewatch	·	1.5 km	MPC · JPL
356025	2009 BF_{147}	—	January 30, 2009	Mount Lemmon	Mount Lemmon Survey	ADE	1.8 km	MPC · JPL
356026	2009 BE_{150}	—	January 31, 2009	Kitt Peak	Spacewatch	·	730 m	MPC · JPL
356027	2009 BY_{150}	—	January 28, 2009	Catalina	CSS	(5)	1.6 km	MPC · JPL
356028	2009 BK_{157}	—	January 25, 2009	Kitt Peak	Spacewatch	·	2.0 km	MPC · JPL
356029	2009 BA_{158}	—	January 31, 2009	Kitt Peak	Spacewatch	·	1.1 km	MPC · JPL
356030	2009 BF_{162}	—	January 29, 2009	Catalina	CSS	·	1.6 km	MPC · JPL
356031	2009 BL_{163}	—	December 3, 2008	Mount Lemmon	Mount Lemmon Survey	·	1.1 km	MPC · JPL
356032	2009 BO_{163}	—	January 31, 2009	Kitt Peak	Spacewatch	(5)	900 m	MPC · JPL
356033	2009 BW_{165}	—	January 31, 2009	Kitt Peak	Spacewatch	·	1.2 km	MPC · JPL
356034	2009 BE_{177}	—	January 25, 2009	Kitt Peak	Spacewatch	·	1.4 km	MPC · JPL
356035	2009 BT_{182}	—	January 18, 2009	Mount Lemmon	Mount Lemmon Survey	ADE	2.2 km	MPC · JPL
356036	2009 BV_{185}	—	January 20, 2009	Catalina	CSS	·	1.6 km	MPC · JPL
356037	2009 BM_{186}	—	January 18, 2009	Kitt Peak	Spacewatch	·	1.0 km	MPC · JPL
356038	2009 BY_{187}	—	January 20, 2009	Mount Lemmon	Mount Lemmon Survey	·	950 m	MPC · JPL
356039	2009 BX_{188}	—	January 17, 2009	Mount Lemmon	Mount Lemmon Survey	·	1.2 km	MPC · JPL
356040	2009 BP_{189}	—	January 18, 2009	Socorro	LINEAR	·	1.4 km	MPC · JPL
356041	2009 CV_{14}	—	February 1, 2009	Kitt Peak	Spacewatch	·	920 m	MPC · JPL
356042	2009 CR_{18}	—	February 3, 2009	Mount Lemmon	Mount Lemmon Survey	·	2.0 km	MPC · JPL
356043	2009 CT_{29}	—	February 1, 2009	Kitt Peak	Spacewatch	·	1.2 km	MPC · JPL
356044	2009 CZ_{38}	—	February 13, 2009	Kitt Peak	Spacewatch	·	1.2 km	MPC · JPL
356045	2009 CS_{40}	—	February 13, 2009	Kitt Peak	Spacewatch	·	1.6 km	MPC · JPL
356046	2009 CL_{47}	—	February 14, 2009	Kitt Peak	Spacewatch	EUN	1.5 km	MPC · JPL
356047	2009 CW_{51}	—	February 14, 2009	Mount Lemmon	Mount Lemmon Survey	·	1.7 km	MPC · JPL
356048	2009 CM_{57}	—	February 1, 2009	Kitt Peak	Spacewatch	·	1.5 km	MPC · JPL
356049	2009 CY_{57}	—	February 3, 2009	Kitt Peak	Spacewatch	NYS	1.4 km	MPC · JPL
356050	2009 CM_{62}	—	February 5, 2009	Mount Lemmon	Mount Lemmon Survey	·	1.6 km	MPC · JPL
356051	2009 CW_{62}	—	February 3, 2009	Kitt Peak	Spacewatch	·	1.4 km	MPC · JPL
356052	2009 DC_{5}	—	February 4, 2009	Mount Lemmon	Mount Lemmon Survey	·	1.9 km	MPC · JPL
356053	2009 DQ_{5}	—	February 20, 2009	Cordell-Lorenz	D. T. Durig	·	1.1 km	MPC · JPL
356054	2009 DS_{5}	—	February 20, 2009	Cordell-Lorenz	D. T. Durig	·	1.1 km	MPC · JPL
356055	2009 DX_{9}	—	February 1, 2009	Catalina	CSS	ADE	2.3 km	MPC · JPL
356056	2009 DE_{13}	—	February 16, 2009	Kitt Peak	Spacewatch	·	930 m	MPC · JPL
356057	2009 DS_{25}	—	February 21, 2009	Mount Lemmon	Mount Lemmon Survey	·	1.2 km	MPC · JPL
356058	2009 DK_{27}	—	February 22, 2009	Calar Alto	F. Hormuth	·	2.0 km	MPC · JPL
356059	2009 DB_{34}	—	February 1, 2009	Mount Lemmon	Mount Lemmon Survey	·	1.9 km	MPC · JPL
356060	2009 DD_{35}	—	February 20, 2009	Kitt Peak	Spacewatch	·	2.5 km	MPC · JPL
356061	2009 DV_{38}	—	February 1, 2009	Kitt Peak	Spacewatch	·	1.4 km	MPC · JPL
356062	2009 DV_{41}	—	February 26, 2009	Catalina	CSS	·	1.7 km	MPC · JPL
356063	2009 DF_{50}	—	February 19, 2009	Kitt Peak	Spacewatch	·	1.7 km	MPC · JPL
356064	2009 DS_{50}	—	January 31, 2009	Mount Lemmon	Mount Lemmon Survey	EUN	1.3 km	MPC · JPL
356065	2009 DP_{51}	—	February 21, 2009	Mount Lemmon	Mount Lemmon Survey	MAR	980 m	MPC · JPL
356066	2009 DJ_{61}	—	February 22, 2009	Kitt Peak	Spacewatch	(5)	1.5 km	MPC · JPL
356067	2009 DH_{62}	—	February 22, 2009	Mount Lemmon	Mount Lemmon Survey	·	1.2 km	MPC · JPL
356068	2009 DD_{64}	—	February 22, 2009	Kitt Peak	Spacewatch	EUN	1.7 km	MPC · JPL
356069	2009 DE_{70}	—	March 8, 2005	Mount Lemmon	Mount Lemmon Survey	·	1.6 km	MPC · JPL
356070	2009 DD_{75}	—	February 19, 2009	Kitt Peak	Spacewatch	·	1.4 km	MPC · JPL
356071	2009 DO_{77}	—	February 23, 2009	La Sagra	OAM	·	1.3 km	MPC · JPL
356072	2009 DC_{78}	—	February 25, 2009	Catalina	CSS	·	1.2 km	MPC · JPL
356073	2009 DZ_{81}	—	February 24, 2009	Kitt Peak	Spacewatch	·	2.1 km	MPC · JPL
356074	2009 DD_{85}	—	February 27, 2009	Kitt Peak	Spacewatch	·	1.3 km	MPC · JPL
356075	2009 DV_{92}	—	February 28, 2009	Mount Lemmon	Mount Lemmon Survey	·	1.6 km	MPC · JPL
356076	2009 DD_{97}	—	February 26, 2009	Kitt Peak	Spacewatch	·	2.8 km	MPC · JPL
356077	2009 DP_{97}	—	February 26, 2009	Kitt Peak	Spacewatch	·	1.2 km	MPC · JPL
356078	2009 DM_{99}	—	February 26, 2009	Kitt Peak	Spacewatch	·	1.4 km	MPC · JPL
356079	2009 DF_{100}	—	February 22, 2009	Kitt Peak	Spacewatch	·	1.2 km	MPC · JPL
356080	2009 DE_{103}	—	November 20, 2003	Catalina	CSS	·	2.0 km	MPC · JPL
356081	2009 DV_{105}	—	February 26, 2009	Kitt Peak	Spacewatch	·	2.0 km	MPC · JPL
356082	2009 DJ_{111}	—	March 1, 2005	Catalina	CSS	·	1.7 km	MPC · JPL
356083	2009 DJ_{113}	—	February 27, 2009	Kitt Peak	Spacewatch	·	1.3 km	MPC · JPL
356084	2009 DP_{117}	—	February 27, 2009	Kitt Peak	Spacewatch	·	2.1 km	MPC · JPL
356085	2009 DK_{120}	—	February 13, 2009	Kitt Peak	Spacewatch	·	1.9 km	MPC · JPL
356086	2009 DG_{128}	—	February 21, 2009	Kitt Peak	Spacewatch	EUN	1.6 km	MPC · JPL
356087	2009 DY_{131}	—	February 20, 2009	Mount Lemmon	Mount Lemmon Survey	·	1.7 km	MPC · JPL
356088	2009 DL_{133}	—	February 27, 2009	Kitt Peak	Spacewatch	·	1.4 km	MPC · JPL
356089	2009 DQ_{134}	—	February 27, 2009	Kitt Peak	Spacewatch	·	2.2 km	MPC · JPL
356090	2009 DM_{136}	—	February 19, 2009	Catalina	CSS	·	1.2 km	MPC · JPL
356091	2009 DX_{137}	—	February 19, 2009	Kitt Peak	Spacewatch	·	1.4 km	MPC · JPL
356092	2009 DS_{140}	—	February 19, 2009	Catalina	CSS	·	1.1 km	MPC · JPL
356093	2009 DM_{142}	—	February 20, 2009	Kitt Peak	Spacewatch	·	1.9 km	MPC · JPL
356094	2009 DQ_{142}	—	February 20, 2009	Kitt Peak	Spacewatch	AGN	1.1 km	MPC · JPL
356095	2009 DU_{142}	—	February 27, 2009	Kitt Peak	Spacewatch	MRX	1.2 km	MPC · JPL
356096	2009 EE_{4}	—	March 15, 2009	La Sagra	OAM	·	2.4 km	MPC · JPL
356097	2009 EO_{4}	—	March 15, 2009	La Sagra	OAM	·	2.3 km	MPC · JPL
356098	2009 EP_{16}	—	February 19, 2009	La Sagra	OAM	·	1.7 km	MPC · JPL
356099	2009 EZ_{25}	—	March 8, 2009	Mount Lemmon	Mount Lemmon Survey	·	1.8 km	MPC · JPL
356100	2009 ED_{27}	—	March 15, 2009	Kitt Peak	Spacewatch	·	1.7 km	MPC · JPL

== 356101–356200 ==
back to top

Designation			Discovery			Properties		Ref
Permanent	Provisional	Named after	Date	Site	Discoverer(s)	Category	Diam.	Ref
356101	2009 ER_{27}	—	March 5, 2009	Siding Spring	SSS	·	1.4 km	MPC · JPL
356102	2009 EK_{30}	—	March 3, 2009	Kitt Peak	Spacewatch	·	1.8 km	MPC · JPL
356103	2009 EV_{30}	—	March 3, 2009	Kitt Peak	Spacewatch	·	2.6 km	MPC · JPL
356104	2009 FC_{4}	—	March 18, 2009	Taunus	Karge, S., E. Schwab	·	1.2 km	MPC · JPL
356105	2009 FT_{7}	—	March 16, 2009	Kitt Peak	Spacewatch	·	1.7 km	MPC · JPL
356106	2009 FW_{8}	—	February 24, 2009	Kitt Peak	Spacewatch	AGN	1.3 km	MPC · JPL
356107	2009 FC_{11}	—	December 30, 2008	Mount Lemmon	Mount Lemmon Survey	MAR	1.0 km	MPC · JPL
356108	2009 FU_{14}	—	March 16, 2009	Kitt Peak	Spacewatch	·	1.9 km	MPC · JPL
356109	2009 FT_{17}	—	March 18, 2009	La Sagra	OAM	·	1.3 km	MPC · JPL
356110	2009 FS_{19}	—	March 21, 2009	Dauban	Kugel, F.	·	1.6 km	MPC · JPL
356111	2009 FE_{20}	—	March 17, 2009	Bergisch Gladbach	W. Bickel	·	1.2 km	MPC · JPL
356112	2009 FY_{21}	—	March 18, 2009	Kitt Peak	Spacewatch	·	2.1 km	MPC · JPL
356113	2009 FQ_{22}	—	March 19, 2009	Catalina	CSS	JUN	1.2 km	MPC · JPL
356114	2009 FP_{23}	—	March 21, 2009	Mount Lemmon	Mount Lemmon Survey	·	1.8 km	MPC · JPL
356115	2009 FO_{27}	—	March 21, 2009	Mount Lemmon	Mount Lemmon Survey	·	1 km	MPC · JPL
356116	2009 FJ_{28}	—	March 22, 2009	La Sagra	OAM	·	2.0 km	MPC · JPL
356117	2009 FR_{28}	—	March 18, 2009	Catalina	CSS	(5)	1.3 km	MPC · JPL
356118	2009 FL_{29}	—	June 4, 2005	Kitt Peak	Spacewatch	HOF	2.9 km	MPC · JPL
356119	2009 FW_{30}	—	March 19, 2009	La Sagra	OAM	·	1.8 km	MPC · JPL
356120	2009 FX_{31}	—	March 25, 2009	La Sagra	OAM	JUN	1.1 km	MPC · JPL
356121	2009 FM_{32}	—	March 21, 2009	Catalina	CSS	·	1.3 km	MPC · JPL
356122	2009 FS_{35}	—	March 22, 2009	Mount Lemmon	Mount Lemmon Survey	·	1.1 km	MPC · JPL
356123	2009 FR_{37}	—	March 24, 2009	Mount Lemmon	Mount Lemmon Survey	·	2.5 km	MPC · JPL
356124	2009 FD_{39}	—	March 22, 2009	Catalina	CSS	JUN	1.4 km	MPC · JPL
356125	2009 FE_{42}	—	March 28, 2009	Kitt Peak	Spacewatch	·	1.7 km	MPC · JPL
356126	2009 FR_{42}	—	March 1, 2009	Kitt Peak	Spacewatch	AGN	1.4 km	MPC · JPL
356127	2009 FZ_{45}	—	February 1, 2009	Mount Lemmon	Mount Lemmon Survey	·	2.1 km	MPC · JPL
356128	2009 FN_{46}	—	March 27, 2009	Kitt Peak	Spacewatch	·	1.7 km	MPC · JPL
356129	2009 FM_{47}	—	March 28, 2009	Kitt Peak	Spacewatch	AEO	1.5 km	MPC · JPL
356130	2009 FV_{47}	—	March 16, 2009	Mount Lemmon	Mount Lemmon Survey	·	1.3 km	MPC · JPL
356131	2009 FM_{55}	—	March 31, 2009	Kitt Peak	Spacewatch	·	1.7 km	MPC · JPL
356132	2009 FS_{55}	—	March 26, 2009	La Sagra	OAM	JUN	1.3 km	MPC · JPL
356133	2009 FE_{56}	—	March 19, 2009	Catalina	CSS	·	2.4 km	MPC · JPL
356134	2009 FS_{58}	—	August 27, 2006	Kitt Peak	Spacewatch	·	1.8 km	MPC · JPL
356135	2009 FL_{59}	—	March 17, 2009	Kitt Peak	Spacewatch	·	2.0 km	MPC · JPL
356136	2009 FC_{60}	—	March 16, 2009	Mount Lemmon	Mount Lemmon Survey	·	2.2 km	MPC · JPL
356137	2009 FQ_{60}	—	October 8, 2007	Mount Lemmon	Mount Lemmon Survey	JUN	900 m	MPC · JPL
356138	2009 FX_{63}	—	October 9, 2007	Kitt Peak	Spacewatch	·	1.8 km	MPC · JPL
356139	2009 FD_{66}	—	March 19, 2009	Mount Lemmon	Mount Lemmon Survey	·	1.4 km	MPC · JPL
356140	2009 FF_{66}	—	March 21, 2009	Kitt Peak	Spacewatch	·	1.4 km	MPC · JPL
356141	2009 FR_{69}	—	March 18, 2009	Kitt Peak	Spacewatch	·	1.9 km	MPC · JPL
356142	2009 FX_{70}	—	March 25, 2009	Mount Lemmon	Mount Lemmon Survey	EOS	2.2 km	MPC · JPL
356143	2009 FR_{72}	—	March 18, 2009	Catalina	CSS	JUN	1.3 km	MPC · JPL
356144	2009 FK_{73}	—	March 24, 2009	Mount Lemmon	Mount Lemmon Survey	(5)	1.5 km	MPC · JPL
356145	2009 FD_{75}	—	March 16, 2009	Kitt Peak	Spacewatch	·	2.2 km	MPC · JPL
356146	2009 GV_{1}	—	April 12, 2009	Altschwendt	W. Ries	·	1.8 km	MPC · JPL
356147	2009 GW_{3}	—	April 3, 2009	Cerro Burek	Burek, Cerro	·	2.9 km	MPC · JPL
356148	2009 GT_{5}	—	November 11, 2007	Mount Lemmon	Mount Lemmon Survey	·	1.9 km	MPC · JPL
356149	2009 HA_{3}	—	April 16, 2009	Catalina	CSS	EUN	1.6 km	MPC · JPL
356150	2009 HH_{4}	—	March 29, 2009	Mount Lemmon	Mount Lemmon Survey	·	2.8 km	MPC · JPL
356151	2009 HW_{4}	—	March 17, 2009	Kitt Peak	Spacewatch	·	2.2 km	MPC · JPL
356152	2009 HO_{11}	—	April 18, 2009	Catalina	CSS	TIR	3.4 km	MPC · JPL
356153	2009 HD_{12}	—	April 16, 2009	Piszkéstető	K. Sárneczky	·	1.6 km	MPC · JPL
356154	2009 HO_{12}	—	April 18, 2009	Piszkéstető	K. Sárneczky	·	1.3 km	MPC · JPL
356155	2009 HZ_{12}	—	April 17, 2009	Kitt Peak	Spacewatch	·	3.5 km	MPC · JPL
356156	2009 HV_{13}	—	March 21, 2009	Catalina	CSS	·	2.6 km	MPC · JPL
356157	2009 HU_{20}	—	April 20, 2009	Tzec Maun	Tozzi, F.	·	2.2 km	MPC · JPL
356158	2009 HA_{29}	—	April 19, 2009	Kitt Peak	Spacewatch	·	1.7 km	MPC · JPL
356159	2009 HC_{29}	—	April 19, 2009	Kitt Peak	Spacewatch	·	1.2 km	MPC · JPL
356160	2009 HH_{30}	—	April 19, 2009	Kitt Peak	Spacewatch	HNS	1.3 km	MPC · JPL
356161	2009 HE_{35}	—	April 20, 2009	Mount Lemmon	Mount Lemmon Survey	·	2.0 km	MPC · JPL
356162	2009 HU_{36}	—	April 21, 2009	La Sagra	OAM	·	1.9 km	MPC · JPL
356163	2009 HH_{37}	—	April 17, 2009	Catalina	CSS	·	3.0 km	MPC · JPL
356164	2009 HL_{42}	—	April 20, 2009	Kitt Peak	Spacewatch	·	2.6 km	MPC · JPL
356165	2009 HU_{45}	—	April 21, 2009	La Sagra	OAM	·	2.2 km	MPC · JPL
356166	2009 HN_{47}	—	April 19, 2009	Kitt Peak	Spacewatch	JUN	1.1 km	MPC · JPL
356167	2009 HO_{48}	—	April 19, 2009	Kitt Peak	Spacewatch	·	3.3 km	MPC · JPL
356168	2009 HR_{56}	—	April 22, 2009	Kitt Peak	Spacewatch	·	2.0 km	MPC · JPL
356169	2009 HT_{59}	—	April 20, 2009	Catalina	CSS	·	2.3 km	MPC · JPL
356170	2009 HH_{70}	—	April 22, 2009	Mount Lemmon	Mount Lemmon Survey	KOR	1.5 km	MPC · JPL
356171	2009 HS_{73}	—	April 18, 2009	Catalina	CSS	·	2.2 km	MPC · JPL
356172	2009 HC_{74}	—	April 20, 2009	Catalina	CSS	·	2.3 km	MPC · JPL
356173	2009 HQ_{74}	—	April 25, 2009	Purple Mountain	PMO NEO Survey Program	·	2.0 km	MPC · JPL
356174	2009 HH_{75}	—	April 28, 2009	Catalina	CSS	·	2.3 km	MPC · JPL
356175	2009 HK_{76}	—	April 26, 2009	Kitt Peak	Spacewatch	·	1.9 km	MPC · JPL
356176	2009 HH_{83}	—	March 25, 2009	Mount Lemmon	Mount Lemmon Survey	·	2.0 km	MPC · JPL
356177	2009 HF_{84}	—	April 27, 2009	Catalina	CSS	·	2.1 km	MPC · JPL
356178	2009 HR_{85}	—	March 16, 2009	Kitt Peak	Spacewatch	·	1.4 km	MPC · JPL
356179	2009 HS_{95}	—	April 18, 2009	Kitt Peak	Spacewatch	·	2.4 km	MPC · JPL
356180	2009 HM_{96}	—	April 23, 2009	Kitt Peak	Spacewatch	·	1.9 km	MPC · JPL
356181	2009 HS_{96}	—	April 27, 2009	Kitt Peak	Spacewatch	·	1.8 km	MPC · JPL
356182	2009 HC_{100}	—	November 15, 2006	Kitt Peak	Spacewatch	·	2.9 km	MPC · JPL
356183	2009 HU_{101}	—	April 17, 2009	Kitt Peak	Spacewatch	EOS	1.9 km	MPC · JPL
356184	2009 HO_{105}	—	April 26, 2009	Kitt Peak	Spacewatch	·	2.1 km	MPC · JPL
356185	2009 JE_{8}	—	May 13, 2009	Kitt Peak	Spacewatch	·	2.1 km	MPC · JPL
356186	2009 JX_{9}	—	May 14, 2009	Kitt Peak	Spacewatch	·	2.2 km	MPC · JPL
356187	2009 JE_{12}	—	May 15, 2009	Catalina	CSS	·	2.1 km	MPC · JPL
356188	2009 JF_{17}	—	May 6, 2009	Siding Spring	SSS	·	2.2 km	MPC · JPL
356189	2009 KE_{7}	—	May 26, 2009	La Sagra	OAM	·	4.5 km	MPC · JPL
356190	2009 KV_{12}	—	May 25, 2009	Kitt Peak	Spacewatch	·	2.4 km	MPC · JPL
356191	2009 KO_{22}	—	May 16, 2009	Mount Lemmon	Mount Lemmon Survey	·	2.4 km	MPC · JPL
356192	2009 KE_{36}	—	May 17, 2009	Mount Lemmon	Mount Lemmon Survey	·	4.0 km	MPC · JPL
356193	2009 LG_{2}	—	February 12, 2008	Mount Lemmon	Mount Lemmon Survey	·	3.5 km	MPC · JPL
356194	2009 LA_{5}	—	June 14, 2009	Kitt Peak	Spacewatch	·	2.4 km	MPC · JPL
356195	2009 MD_{10}	—	June 24, 2009	Mount Lemmon	Mount Lemmon Survey	·	3.6 km	MPC · JPL
356196	2009 OX	—	July 18, 2009	Hibiscus	Teamo, N.	·	3.6 km	MPC · JPL
356197	2009 OB_{1}	—	July 16, 2009	La Sagra	OAM	·	3.9 km	MPC · JPL
356198	2009 OJ_{6}	—	July 23, 2009	La Sagra	OAM	LUT	5.4 km	MPC · JPL
356199	2009 OO_{24}	—	January 26, 2007	Kitt Peak	Spacewatch	LIX	4.2 km	MPC · JPL
356200	2009 OO_{25}	—	February 13, 2001	Kitt Peak	Spacewatch	·	5.0 km	MPC · JPL

== 356201–356300 ==
back to top

Designation			Discovery			Properties		Ref
Permanent	Provisional	Named after	Date	Site	Discoverer(s)	Category	Diam.	Ref
356201	2009 PF_{11}	—	August 15, 2009	Kitt Peak	Spacewatch	·	2.4 km	MPC · JPL
356202	2009 PH_{15}	—	August 15, 2009	Catalina	CSS	·	4.1 km	MPC · JPL
356203	2009 QX_{32}	—	August 24, 2009	Črni Vrh	Matičič, S.	T_{j} (2.99) · EUP	4.7 km	MPC · JPL
356204	2009 QJ_{52}	—	August 16, 2009	Catalina	CSS	·	4.2 km	MPC · JPL
356205	2009 QF_{65}	—	January 16, 2012	Les Engarouines	L. Bernasconi	L4	10 km	MPC · JPL
356206	2009 RN_{13}	—	September 12, 2009	Kitt Peak	Spacewatch	L4	9.5 km	MPC · JPL
356207	2009 RT_{20}	—	September 14, 2009	Kitt Peak	Spacewatch	L4	8.8 km	MPC · JPL
356208	2009 RK_{25}	—	June 22, 2007	Kitt Peak	Spacewatch	L4	10 km	MPC · JPL
356209	2009 RS_{31}	—	September 14, 2009	Kitt Peak	Spacewatch	L4	10 km	MPC · JPL
356210	2009 RY_{31}	—	September 14, 2009	Kitt Peak	Spacewatch	L4	9.2 km	MPC · JPL
356211	2009 RB_{63}	—	September 12, 2009	Kitt Peak	Spacewatch	L4	8.0 km	MPC · JPL
356212	2009 RP_{64}	—	September 15, 2009	Kitt Peak	Spacewatch	L4	8.3 km	MPC · JPL
356213	2009 RX_{64}	—	September 15, 2009	Kitt Peak	Spacewatch	L4	7.4 km	MPC · JPL
356214	2009 RN_{73}	—	February 14, 2001	Cima Ekar	ADAS	L4	10 km	MPC · JPL
356215	2009 SX_{40}	—	September 16, 2009	Kitt Peak	Spacewatch	L4	8.3 km	MPC · JPL
356216	2009 SH_{69}	—	September 17, 2009	Kitt Peak	Spacewatch	L4	7.8 km	MPC · JPL
356217 Clymene	2009 SA_{101}	Clymene	September 23, 2009	Zelenchukskaya Stn108698	T. V. Krjačko	L4 · HEK	10 km	MPC · JPL
356218	2009 SZ_{117}	—	September 18, 2009	Kitt Peak	Spacewatch	L4	6.5 km	MPC · JPL
356219	2009 SJ_{121}	—	September 18, 2009	Kitt Peak	Spacewatch	L4	7.2 km	MPC · JPL
356220	2009 SM_{123}	—	September 5, 2008	Kitt Peak	Spacewatch	L4	8.8 km	MPC · JPL
356221	2009 SF_{178}	—	September 20, 2009	Kitt Peak	Spacewatch	L4	7.8 km	MPC · JPL
356222	2009 SF_{194}	—	July 29, 2008	Mount Lemmon	Mount Lemmon Survey	L4 · ERY	8.1 km	MPC · JPL
356223	2009 SH_{197}	—	September 18, 2009	Kitt Peak	Spacewatch	L4	9.9 km	MPC · JPL
356224	2009 SW_{199}	—	September 22, 2009	Kitt Peak	Spacewatch	L4	7.4 km	MPC · JPL
356225	2009 SY_{208}	—	September 15, 2009	Kitt Peak	Spacewatch	L4	7.8 km	MPC · JPL
356226	2009 SF_{246}	—	September 17, 2009	Kitt Peak	Spacewatch	L4	9.2 km	MPC · JPL
356227	2009 SE_{248}	—	September 22, 2009	Kitt Peak	Spacewatch	L4	7.4 km	MPC · JPL
356228	2009 SJ_{248}	—	September 23, 2009	Kitt Peak	Spacewatch	L4	7.9 km	MPC · JPL
356229	2009 SW_{273}	—	September 25, 2009	Kitt Peak	Spacewatch	L4	6.7 km	MPC · JPL
356230	2009 SK_{277}	—	September 25, 2009	Kitt Peak	Spacewatch	·	3.8 km	MPC · JPL
356231	2009 SS_{293}	—	September 19, 2009	Kitt Peak	Spacewatch	L4	8.9 km	MPC · JPL
356232	2009 SZ_{297}	—	September 17, 2009	Kitt Peak	Spacewatch	L4	8.9 km	MPC · JPL
356233	2009 SG_{299}	—	February 12, 2002	Kitt Peak	Spacewatch	L4	10 km	MPC · JPL
356234	2009 SA_{300}	—	September 17, 2009	Kitt Peak	Spacewatch	L4	7.1 km	MPC · JPL
356235	2009 SJ_{317}	—	September 19, 2009	Kitt Peak	Spacewatch	L4	6.7 km	MPC · JPL
356236	2009 ST_{323}	—	September 23, 2009	Mount Lemmon	Mount Lemmon Survey	L4	9.9 km	MPC · JPL
356237	2009 SA_{328}	—	September 18, 2009	Kitt Peak	Spacewatch	L4	9.2 km	MPC · JPL
356238	2009 SY_{353}	—	September 17, 2009	Mount Lemmon	Mount Lemmon Survey	L4	10 km	MPC · JPL
356239	2009 SA_{354}	—	November 17, 1998	Kitt Peak	Spacewatch	L4	7.5 km	MPC · JPL
356240	2009 SB_{354}	—	September 28, 2009	Mount Lemmon	Mount Lemmon Survey	L4	8.9 km	MPC · JPL
356241	2009 SS_{354}	—	September 17, 2009	Kitt Peak	Spacewatch	L4	10 km	MPC · JPL
356242	2009 SU_{354}	—	September 26, 2009	Kitt Peak	Spacewatch	L4	7.4 km	MPC · JPL
356243	2009 SE_{355}	—	September 23, 2009	Mount Lemmon	Mount Lemmon Survey	L4	9.1 km	MPC · JPL
356244	2009 SL_{357}	—	September 22, 2009	Kitt Peak	Spacewatch	L4	8.1 km	MPC · JPL
356245	2009 TR_{15}	—	October 1, 2009	Mount Lemmon	Mount Lemmon Survey	L4	12 km	MPC · JPL
356246	2009 TE_{25}	—	October 14, 2009	Catalina	CSS	H	600 m	MPC · JPL
356247	2009 UP_{7}	—	October 16, 2009	Mount Lemmon	Mount Lemmon Survey	L4	7.1 km	MPC · JPL
356248	2009 UO_{12}	—	August 17, 2009	Kitt Peak	Spacewatch	L4	7.5 km	MPC · JPL
356249	2009 UT_{48}	—	September 15, 2009	Kitt Peak	Spacewatch	L4	7.3 km	MPC · JPL
356250	2009 UB_{49}	—	April 5, 2003	Kitt Peak	Spacewatch	L4	7.7 km	MPC · JPL
356251	2009 UZ_{50}	—	September 22, 2009	Kitt Peak	Spacewatch	L4	7.4 km	MPC · JPL
356252	2009 UT_{53}	—	October 23, 2009	Mount Lemmon	Mount Lemmon Survey	L4	9.6 km	MPC · JPL
356253	2009 UK_{77}	—	October 21, 2009	Mount Lemmon	Mount Lemmon Survey	L4	6.5 km	MPC · JPL
356254	2009 US_{78}	—	November 15, 1998	Kitt Peak	Spacewatch	L4	8.2 km	MPC · JPL
356255	2009 UP_{120}	—	September 22, 2009	Kitt Peak	Spacewatch	L4	7.6 km	MPC · JPL
356256	2009 UK_{130}	—	September 20, 2009	Catalina	CSS	H	560 m	MPC · JPL
356257	2009 UL_{140}	—	October 23, 2009	Mount Lemmon	Mount Lemmon Survey	L4 · ERY	11 km	MPC · JPL
356258	2009 UN_{147}	—	October 16, 2009	Mount Lemmon	Mount Lemmon Survey	L4	6.8 km	MPC · JPL
356259	2009 UV_{148}	—	October 16, 2009	Mount Lemmon	Mount Lemmon Survey	L4 · ERY	11 km	MPC · JPL
356260	2009 US_{153}	—	October 21, 2009	Siding Spring	SSS	H	790 m	MPC · JPL
356261	2009 VB_{3}	—	November 8, 2009	Mayhill	Shurpakov, S.	L4	18 km	MPC · JPL
356262	2009 VL_{15}	—	September 12, 2007	Mount Lemmon	Mount Lemmon Survey	L4	7.4 km	MPC · JPL
356263	2009 VO_{21}	—	October 25, 2009	Kitt Peak	Spacewatch	L4	10 km	MPC · JPL
356264	2009 VE_{25}	—	October 2, 2009	Mount Lemmon	Mount Lemmon Survey	L4	12 km	MPC · JPL
356265	2009 VQ_{26}	—	November 8, 2009	Kitt Peak	Spacewatch	L4	10 km	MPC · JPL
356266	2009 VY_{45}	—	November 9, 2009	Kitt Peak	Spacewatch	L4	10 km	MPC · JPL
356267	2009 VS_{72}	—	November 15, 2009	Socorro	LINEAR	H	610 m	MPC · JPL
356268	2009 WW_{2}	—	October 26, 2009	Kitt Peak	Spacewatch	L4	9.4 km	MPC · JPL
356269	2009 WR_{18}	—	November 17, 2009	Mount Lemmon	Mount Lemmon Survey	3:2	6.1 km	MPC · JPL
356270	2009 WJ_{107}	—	November 17, 2009	Mount Lemmon	Mount Lemmon Survey	L4 · ERY	8.9 km	MPC · JPL
356271	2009 WN_{113}	—	November 18, 2009	Mount Lemmon	Mount Lemmon Survey	L4	8.1 km	MPC · JPL
356272	2009 WJ_{135}	—	October 8, 2008	Mount Lemmon	Mount Lemmon Survey	L4	7.3 km	MPC · JPL
356273	2009 WL_{152}	—	November 19, 2009	Mount Lemmon	Mount Lemmon Survey	L4	8.9 km	MPC · JPL
356274	2009 YC_{7}	—	December 16, 2009	Gnosca	S. Sposetti	H	810 m	MPC · JPL
356275	2010 AU_{92}	—	January 8, 2010	WISE	WISE	L4	14 km	MPC · JPL
356276	2010 AJ_{107}	—	September 7, 2008	Mount Lemmon	Mount Lemmon Survey	L4 · HEK	9.9 km	MPC · JPL
356277	2010 BL_{5}	—	January 4, 2001	Haleakala	NEAT	L4	10 km	MPC · JPL
356278	2010 BG_{28}	—	January 18, 2010	WISE	WISE	·	2.8 km	MPC · JPL
356279	2010 BD_{41}	—	August 23, 2007	Kitt Peak	Spacewatch	L4	16 km	MPC · JPL
356280	2010 BK_{89}	—	August 31, 2007	Siding Spring	K. Sárneczky, L. Kiss	L4	9.2 km	MPC · JPL
356281	2010 CO_{107}	—	February 14, 2010	Kitt Peak	Spacewatch	·	930 m	MPC · JPL
356282	2010 CB_{170}	—	February 10, 2010	Kitt Peak	Spacewatch	·	650 m	MPC · JPL
356283	2010 CY_{217}	—	February 3, 2006	Mount Lemmon	Mount Lemmon Survey	·	700 m	MPC · JPL
356284	2010 CH_{242}	—	September 23, 2008	Mount Lemmon	Mount Lemmon Survey	L4 · ERY	12 km	MPC · JPL
356285	2010 DE	—	February 16, 2010	Mount Lemmon	Mount Lemmon Survey	AMO +1km	1.2 km	MPC · JPL
356286	2010 DO_{26}	—	February 20, 2010	WISE	WISE	·	2.9 km	MPC · JPL
356287	2010 DG_{43}	—	February 17, 2010	Kitt Peak	Spacewatch	·	750 m	MPC · JPL
356288	2010 DP_{75}	—	February 17, 2010	Kitt Peak	Spacewatch	·	1.2 km	MPC · JPL
356289	2010 EU_{37}	—	March 12, 2010	Mount Lemmon	Mount Lemmon Survey	·	840 m	MPC · JPL
356290	2010 EL_{70}	—	March 12, 2010	Kitt Peak	Spacewatch	·	980 m	MPC · JPL
356291	2010 ET_{98}	—	March 14, 2010	Kitt Peak	Spacewatch	·	2.6 km	MPC · JPL
356292	2010 EJ_{123}	—	March 15, 2010	Kitt Peak	Spacewatch	·	1.1 km	MPC · JPL
356293	2010 EH_{125}	—	October 15, 2004	Mount Lemmon	Mount Lemmon Survey	·	1.1 km	MPC · JPL
356294	2010 EQ_{128}	—	March 12, 2010	Kitt Peak	Spacewatch	·	680 m	MPC · JPL
356295	2010 EW_{137}	—	March 13, 2010	Kitt Peak	Spacewatch	·	820 m	MPC · JPL
356296	2010 FQ_{13}	—	March 5, 1997	Kitt Peak	Spacewatch	·	560 m	MPC · JPL
356297	2010 FY_{20}	—	August 12, 2004	Cerro Tololo	Deep Ecliptic Survey	·	1.8 km	MPC · JPL
356298	2010 FT_{47}	—	March 22, 2010	ESA OGS	ESA OGS	·	1.4 km	MPC · JPL
356299	2010 FN_{88}	—	March 16, 2010	Kitt Peak	Spacewatch	·	960 m	MPC · JPL
356300	2010 GF_{27}	—	April 5, 2010	Kitt Peak	Spacewatch	V	850 m	MPC · JPL

== 356301–356400 ==
back to top

Designation			Discovery			Properties		Ref
Permanent	Provisional	Named after	Date	Site	Discoverer(s)	Category	Diam.	Ref
356301	2010 GH_{27}	—	April 5, 2010	Kitt Peak	Spacewatch	·	1.6 km	MPC · JPL
356302	2010 GB_{28}	—	April 6, 2010	Kitt Peak	Spacewatch	V	710 m	MPC · JPL
356303	2010 GL_{72}	—	April 13, 2010	WISE	WISE	·	2.7 km	MPC · JPL
356304	2010 GH_{100}	—	March 26, 1995	Kitt Peak	Spacewatch	·	1.6 km	MPC · JPL
356305	2010 GS_{109}	—	April 9, 2010	Kitt Peak	Spacewatch	·	1.2 km	MPC · JPL
356306	2010 GQ_{116}	—	February 3, 2006	Anderson Mesa	LONEOS	·	1.3 km	MPC · JPL
356307	2010 GO_{124}	—	November 12, 2001	Apache Point	SDSS	·	780 m	MPC · JPL
356308	2010 GW_{144}	—	March 26, 2003	Kitt Peak	Spacewatch	·	600 m	MPC · JPL
356309	2010 GD_{158}	—	April 13, 2010	Mount Lemmon	Mount Lemmon Survey	·	800 m	MPC · JPL
356310	2010 GD_{161}	—	April 7, 2010	Kitt Peak	Spacewatch	·	800 m	MPC · JPL
356311	2010 GF_{161}	—	October 28, 2008	Kitt Peak	Spacewatch	·	880 m	MPC · JPL
356312	2010 HY_{54}	—	April 25, 2010	WISE	WISE	·	3.5 km	MPC · JPL
356313	2010 HB_{73}	—	April 27, 2010	WISE	WISE	T_{j} (2.98)	4.3 km	MPC · JPL
356314	2010 HR_{77}	—	November 25, 2005	Kitt Peak	Spacewatch	·	720 m	MPC · JPL
356315	2010 HY_{78}	—	April 26, 2010	Mount Lemmon	Mount Lemmon Survey	·	1.2 km	MPC · JPL
356316	2010 HV_{79}	—	January 23, 2006	Kitt Peak	Spacewatch	MAS	740 m	MPC · JPL
356317	2010 HW_{103}	—	April 26, 2010	Mount Lemmon	Mount Lemmon Survey	·	710 m	MPC · JPL
356318	2010 HT_{104}	—	April 20, 2010	Siding Spring	SSS	·	830 m	MPC · JPL
356319	2010 HW_{105}	—	April 20, 2010	Kitt Peak	Spacewatch	·	870 m	MPC · JPL
356320	2010 JK_{8}	—	May 1, 2010	WISE	WISE	·	3.7 km	MPC · JPL
356321	2010 JZ_{37}	—	May 3, 2010	Kitt Peak	Spacewatch	·	1.5 km	MPC · JPL
356322	2010 JD_{45}	—	November 20, 2008	Mount Lemmon	Mount Lemmon Survey	PHO	1.0 km	MPC · JPL
356323	2010 JJ_{45}	—	May 7, 2010	Kitt Peak	Spacewatch	·	1.2 km	MPC · JPL
356324	2010 JZ_{58}	—	May 7, 2010	WISE	WISE	DOR	3.4 km	MPC · JPL
356325	2010 JK_{64}	—	April 24, 2009	Kitt Peak	Spacewatch	·	4.6 km	MPC · JPL
356326	2010 JG_{72}	—	January 23, 2006	Kitt Peak	Spacewatch	·	810 m	MPC · JPL
356327	2010 JV_{73}	—	May 8, 2010	Mount Lemmon	Mount Lemmon Survey	NYS	1.3 km	MPC · JPL
356328	2010 JL_{75}	—	May 3, 2010	Kitt Peak	Spacewatch	·	1.5 km	MPC · JPL
356329	2010 JM_{75}	—	January 23, 2006	Kitt Peak	Spacewatch	NYS	970 m	MPC · JPL
356330	2010 JU_{94}	—	May 10, 2010	WISE	WISE	·	2.7 km	MPC · JPL
356331	2010 JU_{99}	—	May 11, 2010	WISE	WISE	·	4.5 km	MPC · JPL
356332	2010 JV_{131}	—	May 13, 2010	WISE	WISE	·	3.3 km	MPC · JPL
356333	2010 JS_{147}	—	May 11, 2010	Kitt Peak	Spacewatch	·	1.8 km	MPC · JPL
356334	2010 JV_{151}	—	December 7, 2005	Kitt Peak	Spacewatch	·	710 m	MPC · JPL
356335	2010 JZ_{172}	—	March 21, 1999	Apache Point	SDSS	·	890 m	MPC · JPL
356336	2010 KK_{38}	—	May 17, 2010	Kitt Peak	Spacewatch	·	840 m	MPC · JPL
356337	2010 KA_{62}	—	May 22, 2010	Siding Spring	SSS	ERI	2.2 km	MPC · JPL
356338	2010 KO_{77}	—	May 25, 2010	WISE	WISE	EOS	2.7 km	MPC · JPL
356339	2010 KT_{96}	—	May 28, 2010	WISE	WISE	·	4.1 km	MPC · JPL
356340	2010 KS_{102}	—	May 28, 2010	WISE	WISE	·	4.2 km	MPC · JPL
356341	2010 KL_{111}	—	May 30, 2010	WISE	WISE	·	2.4 km	MPC · JPL
356342	2010 KX_{117}	—	May 19, 2010	Mount Lemmon	Mount Lemmon Survey	·	1.5 km	MPC · JPL
356343	2010 KP_{122}	—	December 14, 2001	Socorro	LINEAR	PHO	1.5 km	MPC · JPL
356344	2010 KN_{125}	—	May 31, 2010	WISE	WISE	·	4.2 km	MPC · JPL
356345	2010 LU_{2}	—	June 1, 2010	WISE	WISE	·	4.7 km	MPC · JPL
356346	2010 LN_{4}	—	June 1, 2010	WISE	WISE	·	3.0 km	MPC · JPL
356347	2010 LF_{31}	—	October 23, 2005	Catalina	CSS	·	5.5 km	MPC · JPL
356348	2010 LP_{34}	—	June 3, 2010	Kitt Peak	Spacewatch	V	750 m	MPC · JPL
356349	2010 LG_{60}	—	June 9, 2010	WISE	WISE	·	4.1 km	MPC · JPL
356350	2010 LX_{61}	—	June 5, 2010	Kitt Peak	Spacewatch	V	680 m	MPC · JPL
356351	2010 LO_{63}	—	April 3, 2006	Catalina	CSS	·	1.2 km	MPC · JPL
356352	2010 LV_{68}	—	June 9, 2010	WISE	WISE	·	4.8 km	MPC · JPL
356353	2010 LJ_{88}	—	June 12, 2010	WISE	WISE	·	3.5 km	MPC · JPL
356354	2010 LV_{90}	—	June 12, 2010	WISE	WISE	VER	4.6 km	MPC · JPL
356355	2010 LW_{101}	—	June 13, 2010	WISE	WISE	·	4.2 km	MPC · JPL
356356	2010 LZ_{102}	—	June 13, 2010	WISE	WISE	·	4.3 km	MPC · JPL
356357	2010 LO_{103}	—	June 13, 2010	WISE	WISE	HYG	2.8 km	MPC · JPL
356358	2010 LJ_{119}	—	June 14, 2010	WISE	WISE	·	4.3 km	MPC · JPL
356359	2010 LZ_{121}	—	June 14, 2010	WISE	WISE	·	5.0 km	MPC · JPL
356360	2010 LF_{125}	—	June 15, 2010	WISE	WISE	·	2.8 km	MPC · JPL
356361	2010 LO_{128}	—	June 16, 2004	Kitt Peak	Spacewatch	·	3.8 km	MPC · JPL
356362	2010 LZ_{129}	—	March 24, 2003	Kitt Peak	Spacewatch	·	4.6 km	MPC · JPL
356363	2010 ME_{18}	—	June 17, 2010	WISE	WISE	·	5.0 km	MPC · JPL
356364	2010 MD_{58}	—	June 24, 2010	WISE	WISE	LUT	5.4 km	MPC · JPL
356365	2010 MP_{63}	—	June 24, 2010	WISE	WISE	VER	3.6 km	MPC · JPL
356366	2010 MB_{68}	—	June 25, 2010	WISE	WISE	·	3.0 km	MPC · JPL
356367	2010 MQ_{79}	—	June 26, 2010	WISE	WISE	·	4.4 km	MPC · JPL
356368	2010 MR_{84}	—	June 27, 2010	WISE	WISE	·	4.7 km	MPC · JPL
356369	2010 MU_{89}	—	June 27, 2010	WISE	WISE	·	4.3 km	MPC · JPL
356370	2010 MJ_{90}	—	September 10, 2004	Kitt Peak	Spacewatch	CYB	5.4 km	MPC · JPL
356371	2010 MC_{99}	—	March 24, 2003	Kitt Peak	Spacewatch	·	3.9 km	MPC · JPL
356372	2010 NR_{4}	—	July 5, 2010	Kitt Peak	Spacewatch	·	1.4 km	MPC · JPL
356373	2010 NF_{5}	—	July 6, 2010	Mount Lemmon	Mount Lemmon Survey	·	1.3 km	MPC · JPL
356374	2010 NR_{5}	—	July 4, 2010	Kitt Peak	Spacewatch	·	3.5 km	MPC · JPL
356375	2010 NB_{32}	—	July 7, 2010	WISE	WISE	·	4.1 km	MPC · JPL
356376	2010 NW_{78}	—	July 15, 2010	WISE	WISE	·	5.5 km	MPC · JPL
356377	2010 NZ_{81}	—	August 28, 2005	Goodricke-Pigott	R. A. Tucker	·	3.4 km	MPC · JPL
356378	2010 NX_{113}	—	July 13, 2010	WISE	WISE	·	2.8 km	MPC · JPL
356379	2010 OW_{4}	—	July 16, 2010	WISE	WISE	·	2.5 km	MPC · JPL
356380	2010 OP_{19}	—	June 17, 2004	Siding Spring	SSS	·	2.4 km	MPC · JPL
356381	2010 OL_{20}	—	September 15, 1993	Kitt Peak	Spacewatch	·	4.9 km	MPC · JPL
356382	2010 ON_{28}	—	January 27, 2007	Kitt Peak	Spacewatch	CYB	4.2 km	MPC · JPL
356383	2010 OY_{39}	—	February 21, 2001	Apache Point	SDSS	·	4.4 km	MPC · JPL
356384	2010 OX_{40}	—	August 21, 2004	Siding Spring	SSS	EUP	5.1 km	MPC · JPL
356385	2010 OJ_{49}	—	October 11, 2004	Kitt Peak	Spacewatch	·	4.5 km	MPC · JPL
356386	2010 OK_{49}	—	June 24, 2004	Mauna Kea	K. J. Meech	·	2.9 km	MPC · JPL
356387	2010 OF_{100}	—	July 20, 2010	Modra	Gajdoš, Š.	·	1.2 km	MPC · JPL
356388	2010 PX_{22}	—	July 25, 2003	Wise	Polishook, D.	CYB	4.9 km	MPC · JPL
356389	2010 PW_{33}	—	October 4, 2004	Kitt Peak	Spacewatch	·	5.3 km	MPC · JPL
356390	2010 PB_{58}	—	April 5, 2000	Socorro	LINEAR	·	2.2 km	MPC · JPL
356391	2010 PF_{59}	—	August 19, 2006	Palomar	NEAT	·	1.7 km	MPC · JPL
356392	2010 PX_{79}	—	February 28, 2008	Kitt Peak	Spacewatch	·	2.9 km	MPC · JPL
356393	2010 PC_{81}	—	December 13, 2006	Kitt Peak	Spacewatch	·	3.0 km	MPC · JPL
356394	2010 QD_{2}	—	August 21, 2010	WISE	WISE	APO +1km	1.1 km	MPC · JPL
356395	2010 RH_{12}	—	July 31, 2001	Palomar	NEAT	·	2.5 km	MPC · JPL
356396	2010 RM_{48}	—	October 6, 1999	Socorro	LINEAR	·	3.6 km	MPC · JPL
356397	2010 RL_{78}	—	September 1, 2010	Mount Lemmon	Mount Lemmon Survey	·	3.6 km	MPC · JPL
356398	2010 RO_{97}	—	January 22, 2002	Kitt Peak	Spacewatch	·	3.5 km	MPC · JPL
356399	2010 RY_{99}	—	August 16, 2001	Socorro	LINEAR	·	1.7 km	MPC · JPL
356400	2010 RU_{111}	—	September 26, 2005	Kitt Peak	Spacewatch	·	1.8 km	MPC · JPL

== 356401–356500 ==
back to top

Designation			Discovery			Properties		Ref
Permanent	Provisional	Named after	Date	Site	Discoverer(s)	Category	Diam.	Ref
356401	2010 RR_{114}	—	October 6, 2005	Kitt Peak	Spacewatch	·	2.0 km	MPC · JPL
356402	2010 RD_{128}	—	February 10, 2008	Kitt Peak	Spacewatch	EMA	4.3 km	MPC · JPL
356403	2010 RW_{162}	—	October 2, 2006	Mount Lemmon	Mount Lemmon Survey	·	2.1 km	MPC · JPL
356404	2010 RQ_{169}	—	February 1, 2003	Kitt Peak	Spacewatch	·	1.8 km	MPC · JPL
356405	2010 RG_{180}	—	September 16, 2004	Kitt Peak	Spacewatch	·	3.6 km	MPC · JPL
356406	2010 SG_{8}	—	March 31, 2004	Kitt Peak	Spacewatch	·	2.3 km	MPC · JPL
356407	2010 SY_{17}	—	October 10, 2005	Kitt Peak	Spacewatch	·	2.8 km	MPC · JPL
356408	2010 SC_{36}	—	September 30, 2010	Catalina	CSS	·	3.3 km	MPC · JPL
356409	2010 TM_{2}	—	April 7, 2008	Mount Lemmon	Mount Lemmon Survey	·	3.7 km	MPC · JPL
356410	2010 TQ_{49}	—	January 26, 2006	Mount Lemmon	Mount Lemmon Survey	CYB	3.6 km	MPC · JPL
356411	2010 TK_{70}	—	March 5, 2008	Kitt Peak	Spacewatch	·	2.8 km	MPC · JPL
356412	2010 TN_{98}	—	July 22, 2004	Mauna Kea	Veillet, C.	·	2.9 km	MPC · JPL
356413	2010 TD_{100}	—	April 7, 2003	Kitt Peak	Spacewatch	·	2.5 km	MPC · JPL
356414	2010 TK_{108}	—	November 15, 2006	Kitt Peak	Spacewatch	·	2.1 km	MPC · JPL
356415	2010 TJ_{158}	—	September 7, 2004	Kitt Peak	Spacewatch	·	2.7 km	MPC · JPL
356416	2010 TM_{173}	—	February 12, 2008	Mount Lemmon	Mount Lemmon Survey	·	3.8 km	MPC · JPL
356417	2010 UG_{31}	—	September 26, 2009	Kitt Peak	Spacewatch	L4	8.3 km	MPC · JPL
356418	2010 UT_{48}	—	September 17, 2009	Kitt Peak	Spacewatch	L4	8.3 km	MPC · JPL
356419	2010 UL_{76}	—	October 30, 2010	Kitt Peak	Spacewatch	L4	10 km	MPC · JPL
356420	2010 UU_{106}	—	January 23, 2004	Socorro	LINEAR	·	2.8 km	MPC · JPL
356421	2010 VC_{13}	—	May 10, 2005	Cerro Tololo	Deep Ecliptic Survey	L4	10 km	MPC · JPL
356422	2010 VO_{24}	—	November 15, 1998	Kitt Peak	Spacewatch	L4	8.1 km	MPC · JPL
356423	2010 VG_{61}	—	September 15, 2009	Kitt Peak	Spacewatch	L4	8.3 km	MPC · JPL
356424	2010 VP_{109}	—	September 25, 2009	Kitt Peak	Spacewatch	L4	8.4 km	MPC · JPL
356425	2010 VS_{119}	—	August 22, 2007	Kitt Peak	Spacewatch	L4	8.3 km	MPC · JPL
356426	2010 VB_{122}	—	February 13, 2002	Apache Point	SDSS	L4 · ERY	7.0 km	MPC · JPL
356427	2010 VJ_{122}	—	October 11, 2010	Mount Lemmon	Mount Lemmon Survey	L4	8.9 km	MPC · JPL
356428	2010 VH_{153}	—	November 7, 2010	Socorro	LINEAR	L4	10 km	MPC · JPL
356429	2010 VB_{176}	—	February 16, 2001	Kitt Peak	Spacewatch	L4	9.8 km	MPC · JPL
356430	2010 VM_{178}	—	September 16, 2009	Kitt Peak	Spacewatch	L4	8.9 km	MPC · JPL
356431	2010 VN_{179}	—	October 16, 2009	Mount Lemmon	Mount Lemmon Survey	L4	8.8 km	MPC · JPL
356432	2010 VW_{192}	—	January 13, 2000	Kitt Peak	Spacewatch	L4	8.7 km	MPC · JPL
356433	2010 VW_{202}	—	October 11, 2010	Mount Lemmon	Mount Lemmon Survey	L4	8.9 km	MPC · JPL
356434	2010 VO_{204}	—	October 30, 1999	Kitt Peak	Spacewatch	·	4.3 km	MPC · JPL
356435	2010 WP_{3}	—	September 15, 2009	Kitt Peak	Spacewatch	L4	6.8 km	MPC · JPL
356436	2010 WA_{5}	—	April 4, 2003	Kitt Peak	Spacewatch	L4	8.7 km	MPC · JPL
356437	2010 WK_{11}	—	July 29, 2008	Kitt Peak	Spacewatch	L4	7.3 km	MPC · JPL
356438	2010 WJ_{21}	—	September 21, 2008	Mount Lemmon	Mount Lemmon Survey	L4	8.1 km	MPC · JPL
356439	2010 WH_{46}	—	September 5, 2008	Kitt Peak	Spacewatch	L4	8.8 km	MPC · JPL
356440	2010 WV_{68}	—	November 7, 2010	Mount Lemmon	Mount Lemmon Survey	L4	8.9 km	MPC · JPL
356441	2010 XX_{7}	—	September 17, 2009	Kitt Peak	Spacewatch	L4	8.5 km	MPC · JPL
356442	2010 XR_{24}	—	November 30, 2000	Apache Point	SDSS	L4	10 km	MPC · JPL
356443	2010 XR_{32}	—	October 29, 2010	Mount Lemmon	Mount Lemmon Survey	L4	8.3 km	MPC · JPL
356444	2010 XK_{35}	—	October 28, 2010	Mount Lemmon	Mount Lemmon Survey	L4	10 km	MPC · JPL
356445	2010 XD_{45}	—	June 6, 2005	Kitt Peak	Spacewatch	L4	10 km	MPC · JPL
356446	2010 XD_{74}	—	June 17, 2005	Mount Lemmon	Mount Lemmon Survey	L4	10 km	MPC · JPL
356447	2010 XW_{75}	—	November 2, 2010	Kitt Peak	Spacewatch	L4	9.0 km	MPC · JPL
356448	2010 XU_{78}	—	September 10, 2007	Kitt Peak	Spacewatch	L4	9.0 km	MPC · JPL
356449	2010 XO_{79}	—	November 8, 2010	Mount Lemmon	Mount Lemmon Survey	L4 · ERY	8.7 km	MPC · JPL
356450	2010 XF_{85}	—	June 11, 2007	Mauna Kea	D. D. Balam, K. M. Perrett	L4	10 km	MPC · JPL
356451	2011 GP_{27}	—	September 13, 1996	La Silla	Uppsala-DLR Trojan Survey	L4	10 km	MPC · JPL
356452	2011 LK_{13}	—	August 22, 2006	Palomar	NEAT	BRA	1.5 km	MPC · JPL
356453	2011 LT_{26}	—	December 27, 2005	Kitt Peak	Spacewatch	·	1.0 km	MPC · JPL
356454	2011 NM	—	November 12, 2001	Socorro	LINEAR	·	930 m	MPC · JPL
356455	2011 OE_{4}	—	June 3, 2011	Mount Lemmon	Mount Lemmon Survey	NYS	1.2 km	MPC · JPL
356456	2011 OT_{16}	—	February 8, 2002	Palomar	NEAT	·	3.3 km	MPC · JPL
356457	2011 OA_{17}	—	December 14, 2003	Kitt Peak	Spacewatch	·	1.7 km	MPC · JPL
356458	2011 OL_{18}	—	March 5, 2002	Kitt Peak	Spacewatch	V	960 m	MPC · JPL
356459	2011 PU_{13}	—	September 13, 2007	Mount Lemmon	Mount Lemmon Survey	EUN	950 m	MPC · JPL
356460	2011 QC_{1}	—	June 19, 2007	Kitt Peak	Spacewatch	·	1.3 km	MPC · JPL
356461	2011 QK_{2}	—	October 24, 2008	Catalina	CSS	·	840 m	MPC · JPL
356462	2011 QY_{8}	—	March 5, 2006	Kitt Peak	Spacewatch	·	1.0 km	MPC · JPL
356463	2011 QU_{22}	—	August 6, 2007	Lulin	LUSS	·	1.7 km	MPC · JPL
356464	2011 QF_{25}	—	October 19, 2007	Mount Lemmon	Mount Lemmon Survey	·	1.6 km	MPC · JPL
356465	2011 QB_{34}	—	January 1, 2008	Mount Lemmon	Mount Lemmon Survey	·	3.1 km	MPC · JPL
356466	2011 QG_{37}	—	September 19, 1998	Apache Point	SDSS	·	810 m	MPC · JPL
356467	2011 QT_{38}	—	December 30, 2008	Mount Lemmon	Mount Lemmon Survey	·	1.6 km	MPC · JPL
356468	2011 QM_{40}	—	July 3, 2011	Mount Lemmon	Mount Lemmon Survey	·	1.8 km	MPC · JPL
356469	2011 QZ_{40}	—	February 18, 2010	Mount Lemmon	Mount Lemmon Survey	·	990 m	MPC · JPL
356470	2011 QU_{46}	—	January 13, 2008	Vail-Jarnac	Jarnac	·	2.7 km	MPC · JPL
356471	2011 QU_{59}	—	December 4, 2008	Mount Lemmon	Mount Lemmon Survey	·	1.4 km	MPC · JPL
356472	2011 QT_{61}	—	November 3, 2004	Kitt Peak	Spacewatch	·	2.3 km	MPC · JPL
356473	2011 QO_{62}	—	January 23, 2006	Mount Lemmon	Mount Lemmon Survey	·	1.2 km	MPC · JPL
356474	2011 QG_{63}	—	February 18, 2010	Mount Lemmon	Mount Lemmon Survey	·	1.5 km	MPC · JPL
356475	2011 QE_{64}	—	August 23, 2007	Kitt Peak	Spacewatch	·	960 m	MPC · JPL
356476	2011 QL_{67}	—	January 2, 2009	Mount Lemmon	Mount Lemmon Survey	·	1.1 km	MPC · JPL
356477	2011 QZ_{67}	—	June 11, 2011	Mount Lemmon	Mount Lemmon Survey	·	1.8 km	MPC · JPL
356478	2011 QT_{72}	—	February 13, 2010	Mount Lemmon	Mount Lemmon Survey	·	800 m	MPC · JPL
356479	2011 QQ_{76}	—	February 8, 2002	Kitt Peak	Spacewatch	·	1.1 km	MPC · JPL
356480	2011 QT_{91}	—	April 2, 2006	Kitt Peak	Spacewatch	·	1.3 km	MPC · JPL
356481	2011 QG_{96}	—	August 17, 1998	Socorro	LINEAR	·	3.9 km	MPC · JPL
356482	2011 RT_{1}	—	September 10, 2007	Mount Lemmon	Mount Lemmon Survey	NEM	2.2 km	MPC · JPL
356483	2011 RB_{2}	—	October 16, 2006	Catalina	CSS	·	2.5 km	MPC · JPL
356484	2011 RL_{9}	—	June 22, 2007	Mount Lemmon	Mount Lemmon Survey	·	1.6 km	MPC · JPL
356485	2011 RQ_{9}	—	April 19, 2006	Mount Lemmon	Mount Lemmon Survey	·	1.5 km	MPC · JPL
356486	2011 RW_{11}	—	September 21, 2000	Kitt Peak	Spacewatch	·	2.9 km	MPC · JPL
356487	2011 RJ_{16}	—	November 25, 2005	Kitt Peak	Spacewatch	·	840 m	MPC · JPL
356488	2011 RQ_{18}	—	March 11, 2002	Palomar	NEAT	V	930 m	MPC · JPL
356489	2011 RS_{19}	—	June 2, 2003	Kitt Peak	Spacewatch	·	1.7 km	MPC · JPL
356490	2011 RU_{19}	—	September 10, 2002	Palomar	NEAT	·	2.1 km	MPC · JPL
356491	2011 SB_{1}	—	May 2, 2006	Mount Lemmon	Mount Lemmon Survey	·	1.3 km	MPC · JPL
356492	2011 SF_{1}	—	March 23, 2006	Kitt Peak	Spacewatch	·	1.4 km	MPC · JPL
356493	2011 SY_{10}	—	December 13, 2007	Socorro	LINEAR	·	2.0 km	MPC · JPL
356494	2011 SA_{13}	—	October 1, 2000	Socorro	LINEAR	·	1.2 km	MPC · JPL
356495	2011 SE_{22}	—	July 3, 2005	Mount Lemmon	Mount Lemmon Survey	LIX	3.0 km	MPC · JPL
356496	2011 SW_{23}	—	July 18, 2006	Siding Spring	SSS	·	2.6 km	MPC · JPL
356497	2011 SL_{27}	—	March 13, 2007	Mount Lemmon	Mount Lemmon Survey	·	920 m	MPC · JPL
356498	2011 SE_{28}	—	October 25, 2008	Socorro	LINEAR	·	780 m	MPC · JPL
356499	2011 SV_{28}	—	October 4, 1997	Kitt Peak	Spacewatch	·	3.2 km	MPC · JPL
356500	2011 SO_{31}	—	December 18, 2001	Anderson Mesa	LONEOS	·	2.7 km	MPC · JPL

== 356501–356600 ==
back to top

Designation			Discovery			Properties		Ref
Permanent	Provisional	Named after	Date	Site	Discoverer(s)	Category	Diam.	Ref
356501	2011 SE_{35}	—	February 25, 2006	Kitt Peak	Spacewatch	·	1.1 km	MPC · JPL
356502	2011 SS_{36}	—	April 12, 2005	Mount Lemmon	Mount Lemmon Survey	·	1.9 km	MPC · JPL
356503	2011 SH_{38}	—	October 18, 2006	Kitt Peak	Spacewatch	·	1.8 km	MPC · JPL
356504	2011 SA_{39}	—	September 11, 2007	Mount Lemmon	Mount Lemmon Survey	·	1.3 km	MPC · JPL
356505	2011 SZ_{39}	—	November 19, 2006	Kitt Peak	Spacewatch	·	2.3 km	MPC · JPL
356506	2011 SP_{42}	—	March 16, 2005	Kitt Peak	Spacewatch	·	880 m	MPC · JPL
356507	2011 SM_{48}	—	September 29, 2008	Mount Lemmon	Mount Lemmon Survey	·	720 m	MPC · JPL
356508	2011 SA_{49}	—	February 17, 2004	Socorro	LINEAR	·	2.3 km	MPC · JPL
356509	2011 SM_{51}	—	April 2, 2005	Mount Lemmon	Mount Lemmon Survey	·	2.1 km	MPC · JPL
356510	2011 SO_{52}	—	January 13, 2008	Kitt Peak	Spacewatch	·	1.7 km	MPC · JPL
356511	2011 SM_{56}	—	September 11, 2007	Mount Lemmon	Mount Lemmon Survey	V	580 m	MPC · JPL
356512	2011 ST_{60}	—	July 7, 2007	Reedy Creek	J. Broughton	slow	1.6 km	MPC · JPL
356513	2011 SE_{68}	—	July 3, 2011	Mount Lemmon	Mount Lemmon Survey	AEO	1.2 km	MPC · JPL
356514	2011 SC_{71}	—	November 17, 2007	Kitt Peak	Spacewatch	AGN	1.2 km	MPC · JPL
356515	2011 SJ_{71}	—	February 2, 2006	Mount Lemmon	Mount Lemmon Survey	V	730 m	MPC · JPL
356516	2011 ST_{83}	—	October 20, 2007	Kitt Peak	Spacewatch	·	1.2 km	MPC · JPL
356517	2011 SX_{84}	—	April 6, 2005	Kitt Peak	Spacewatch	·	1.8 km	MPC · JPL
356518	2011 SY_{84}	—	April 11, 2005	Mount Lemmon	Mount Lemmon Survey	WIT	990 m	MPC · JPL
356519	2011 SC_{87}	—	October 3, 2000	Socorro	LINEAR	·	1.3 km	MPC · JPL
356520	2011 SV_{87}	—	August 26, 1998	Anderson Mesa	LONEOS	·	820 m	MPC · JPL
356521	2011 SV_{89}	—	March 17, 2005	Mount Lemmon	Mount Lemmon Survey	WIT	1.0 km	MPC · JPL
356522	2011 SH_{90}	—	March 20, 1999	Apache Point	SDSS	·	1.1 km	MPC · JPL
356523	2011 SQ_{90}	—	February 27, 2009	Kitt Peak	Spacewatch	AGN	1.6 km	MPC · JPL
356524	2011 SK_{91}	—	December 17, 2007	Kitt Peak	Spacewatch	·	2.8 km	MPC · JPL
356525	2011 SE_{92}	—	November 2, 2007	Kitt Peak	Spacewatch	·	1.3 km	MPC · JPL
356526	2011 SR_{102}	—	October 16, 1977	Palomar	C. J. van Houten, I. van Houten-Groeneveld, T. Gehrels	·	1.8 km	MPC · JPL
356527	2011 SH_{104}	—	January 29, 2009	Mount Lemmon	Mount Lemmon Survey	·	3.4 km	MPC · JPL
356528	2011 SZ_{104}	—	November 10, 2006	Kitt Peak	Spacewatch	·	3.2 km	MPC · JPL
356529	2011 SA_{107}	—	October 25, 2000	Socorro	LINEAR	·	3.3 km	MPC · JPL
356530	2011 SX_{111}	—	October 8, 2007	Catalina	CSS	·	1.7 km	MPC · JPL
356531	2011 SJ_{112}	—	December 2, 1996	Kitt Peak	Spacewatch	·	1.4 km	MPC · JPL
356532	2011 SD_{115}	—	February 28, 2006	Mount Lemmon	Mount Lemmon Survey	·	1.4 km	MPC · JPL
356533	2011 SP_{125}	—	November 19, 2003	Kitt Peak	Spacewatch	·	1.3 km	MPC · JPL
356534	2011 SR_{131}	—	September 22, 2004	Kitt Peak	Spacewatch	·	2.1 km	MPC · JPL
356535	2011 SS_{132}	—	April 5, 2000	Kitt Peak	Spacewatch	AGN	1.3 km	MPC · JPL
356536	2011 SH_{134}	—	December 29, 2008	Mount Lemmon	Mount Lemmon Survey	·	1.8 km	MPC · JPL
356537	2011 SS_{134}	—	October 30, 2007	Kitt Peak	Spacewatch	·	1.6 km	MPC · JPL
356538	2011 SZ_{147}	—	March 10, 2008	Kitt Peak	Spacewatch	·	2.3 km	MPC · JPL
356539	2011 SM_{152}	—	December 5, 2007	Kitt Peak	Spacewatch	KOR	1.2 km	MPC · JPL
356540	2011 SO_{158}	—	October 4, 2002	Socorro	LINEAR	NEM	2.1 km	MPC · JPL
356541	2011 SL_{165}	—	March 31, 2009	Kitt Peak	Spacewatch	·	1.8 km	MPC · JPL
356542	2011 SO_{165}	—	September 20, 2001	Socorro	LINEAR	·	970 m	MPC · JPL
356543	2011 SZ_{166}	—	October 16, 1998	Kitt Peak	Spacewatch	·	1.9 km	MPC · JPL
356544	2011 SV_{174}	—	October 13, 2004	Kitt Peak	Spacewatch	·	1.6 km	MPC · JPL
356545	2011 SZ_{174}	—	November 2, 2006	Mount Lemmon	Mount Lemmon Survey	·	2.6 km	MPC · JPL
356546	2011 SV_{176}	—	November 2, 2007	Kitt Peak	Spacewatch	·	1.4 km	MPC · JPL
356547	2011 SM_{178}	—	August 17, 2006	Palomar	NEAT	·	2.0 km	MPC · JPL
356548	2011 ST_{178}	—	October 5, 2004	Kitt Peak	Spacewatch	·	930 m	MPC · JPL
356549	2011 SC_{179}	—	September 13, 2002	Palomar	NEAT	·	1.8 km	MPC · JPL
356550	2011 ST_{182}	—	March 12, 2010	Kitt Peak	Spacewatch	·	1.2 km	MPC · JPL
356551	2011 SB_{186}	—	August 29, 2006	Kitt Peak	Spacewatch	HOF	2.2 km	MPC · JPL
356552	2011 SZ_{188}	—	February 7, 2002	Palomar	NEAT	·	1.4 km	MPC · JPL
356553	2011 SW_{189}	—	October 2, 1997	Kitt Peak	Spacewatch	·	2.2 km	MPC · JPL
356554	2011 SP_{190}	—	October 12, 2007	Mount Lemmon	Mount Lemmon Survey	·	1.1 km	MPC · JPL
356555	2011 SC_{194}	—	February 20, 2009	Kitt Peak	Spacewatch	·	2.2 km	MPC · JPL
356556	2011 SE_{194}	—	September 15, 2007	Mount Lemmon	Mount Lemmon Survey	·	1.6 km	MPC · JPL
356557	2011 SJ_{194}	—	August 5, 2005	Palomar	NEAT	·	3.6 km	MPC · JPL
356558	2011 SR_{201}	—	February 24, 2006	Kitt Peak	Spacewatch	V	680 m	MPC · JPL
356559	2011 SE_{204}	—	December 15, 2007	Kitt Peak	Spacewatch	·	1.9 km	MPC · JPL
356560	2011 SK_{204}	—	August 24, 2000	Socorro	LINEAR	·	1.2 km	MPC · JPL
356561	2011 SR_{204}	—	April 14, 2002	Kitt Peak	Spacewatch	V	730 m	MPC · JPL
356562	2011 SA_{205}	—	April 2, 2006	Catalina	CSS	·	1.3 km	MPC · JPL
356563	2011 SW_{206}	—	September 20, 2003	Palomar	NEAT	·	1.8 km	MPC · JPL
356564	2011 SX_{207}	—	August 10, 2007	Kitt Peak	Spacewatch	·	1.0 km	MPC · JPL
356565	2011 SG_{208}	—	September 23, 2000	Socorro	LINEAR	·	1.3 km	MPC · JPL
356566	2011 SR_{209}	—	October 8, 2007	Catalina	CSS	·	1.4 km	MPC · JPL
356567	2011 SW_{218}	—	September 1, 2002	Palomar	NEAT	EUN	1.7 km	MPC · JPL
356568	2011 SC_{219}	—	October 10, 2007	Mount Lemmon	Mount Lemmon Survey	V	750 m	MPC · JPL
356569	2011 SN_{223}	—	November 20, 2007	Catalina	CSS	EUN	1.4 km	MPC · JPL
356570	2011 SK_{224}	—	March 22, 1996	Kitt Peak	Spacewatch	·	1.7 km	MPC · JPL
356571	2011 SV_{233}	—	October 11, 2002	Kitt Peak	Spacewatch	·	2.1 km	MPC · JPL
356572	2011 SE_{234}	—	January 25, 2009	Kitt Peak	Spacewatch	·	1.8 km	MPC · JPL
356573	2011 SU_{244}	—	November 15, 2007	Anderson Mesa	LONEOS	·	3.5 km	MPC · JPL
356574	2011 SJ_{245}	—	December 17, 2003	Kitt Peak	Spacewatch	·	1.5 km	MPC · JPL
356575	2011 SL_{245}	—	August 7, 2005	Siding Spring	SSS	·	2.8 km	MPC · JPL
356576	2011 SJ_{246}	—	August 31, 2005	Kitt Peak	Spacewatch	·	3.4 km	MPC · JPL
356577	2011 SB_{248}	—	November 7, 2007	Kitt Peak	Spacewatch	·	2.3 km	MPC · JPL
356578	2011 SY_{249}	—	February 20, 2009	Kitt Peak	Spacewatch	·	1.6 km	MPC · JPL
356579	2011 SL_{251}	—	October 2, 2000	Anderson Mesa	LONEOS	V	910 m	MPC · JPL
356580	2011 SO_{252}	—	April 10, 2005	Kitt Peak	Spacewatch	·	1.7 km	MPC · JPL
356581	2011 SE_{255}	—	November 23, 2003	Anderson Mesa	LONEOS	·	1.9 km	MPC · JPL
356582	2011 SN_{255}	—	October 21, 2003	Kitt Peak	Spacewatch	·	1.6 km	MPC · JPL
356583	2011 SV_{256}	—	October 2, 2006	Mount Lemmon	Mount Lemmon Survey	KOR	1.3 km	MPC · JPL
356584	2011 SF_{257}	—	October 13, 1999	Apache Point	SDSS	·	1.7 km	MPC · JPL
356585	2011 SZ_{257}	—	October 16, 2006	Mount Lemmon	Mount Lemmon Survey	·	2.3 km	MPC · JPL
356586	2011 SS_{258}	—	September 28, 2006	Kitt Peak	Spacewatch	KOR	1.5 km	MPC · JPL
356587	2011 ST_{258}	—	December 16, 2007	Mount Lemmon	Mount Lemmon Survey	·	2.1 km	MPC · JPL
356588	2011 SZ_{258}	—	April 1, 2003	Apache Point	SDSS	(31811)	2.9 km	MPC · JPL
356589	2011 SA_{259}	—	September 24, 2006	Anderson Mesa	LONEOS	·	2.9 km	MPC · JPL
356590	2011 SZ_{271}	—	January 31, 2006	Kitt Peak	Spacewatch	V	680 m	MPC · JPL
356591	2011 SB_{272}	—	May 8, 1997	Kitt Peak	Spacewatch	EUN	1.4 km	MPC · JPL
356592	2011 SN_{274}	—	August 27, 2005	Palomar	NEAT	·	3.3 km	MPC · JPL
356593	2011 SC_{276}	—	October 23, 1995	Kitt Peak	Spacewatch	·	2.0 km	MPC · JPL
356594	2011 TA_{1}	—	March 3, 2000	Socorro	LINEAR	·	1.8 km	MPC · JPL
356595	2011 TE_{1}	—	September 30, 2005	Anderson Mesa	LONEOS	(895)	6.4 km	MPC · JPL
356596	2011 TJ_{1}	—	January 30, 2009	Mount Lemmon	Mount Lemmon Survey	·	1.3 km	MPC · JPL
356597	2011 TS_{1}	—	September 10, 2007	Kitt Peak	Spacewatch	·	1.4 km	MPC · JPL
356598	2011 TQ_{2}	—	August 19, 2006	Kitt Peak	Spacewatch	·	2.1 km	MPC · JPL
356599	2011 TZ_{2}	—	January 19, 2004	Kitt Peak	Spacewatch	·	1.7 km	MPC · JPL
356600	2011 TR_{7}	—	August 27, 2006	Kitt Peak	Spacewatch	HOF	2.6 km	MPC · JPL

== 356601–356700 ==
back to top

Designation			Discovery			Properties		Ref
Permanent	Provisional	Named after	Date	Site	Discoverer(s)	Category	Diam.	Ref
356601	2011 TG_{10}	—	August 27, 2005	Palomar	NEAT	·	3.3 km	MPC · JPL
356602	2011 TC_{12}	—	August 24, 2007	Kitt Peak	Spacewatch	·	1.3 km	MPC · JPL
356603	2011 TF_{12}	—	April 25, 2000	Kitt Peak	Spacewatch	MRX	1.1 km	MPC · JPL
356604	2011 TR_{12}	—	February 7, 2008	Mount Lemmon	Mount Lemmon Survey	·	2.2 km	MPC · JPL
356605	2011 TU_{12}	—	September 24, 2000	Socorro	LINEAR	·	1.3 km	MPC · JPL
356606	2011 TV_{12}	—	August 6, 2005	Palomar	NEAT	·	3.0 km	MPC · JPL
356607	2011 TM_{16}	—	March 12, 2004	Palomar	NEAT	·	2.1 km	MPC · JPL
356608	2011 UQ	—	January 12, 2008	Kitt Peak	Spacewatch	·	2.0 km	MPC · JPL
356609	2011 UY_{1}	—	December 16, 2007	Mount Lemmon	Mount Lemmon Survey	·	1.7 km	MPC · JPL
356610	2011 UV_{2}	—	April 10, 2010	WISE	WISE	·	4.6 km	MPC · JPL
356611	2011 UR_{3}	—	October 30, 2008	Kitt Peak	Spacewatch	·	770 m	MPC · JPL
356612	2011 UC_{6}	—	April 9, 2003	Palomar	NEAT	·	910 m	MPC · JPL
356613	2011 UM_{8}	—	November 2, 2007	Mount Lemmon	Mount Lemmon Survey	·	1.7 km	MPC · JPL
356614	2011 US_{12}	—	January 10, 2008	Desert Eagle	W. K. Y. Yeung	·	2.5 km	MPC · JPL
356615	2011 UC_{13}	—	August 29, 2006	Kitt Peak	Spacewatch	·	2.1 km	MPC · JPL
356616	2011 UN_{13}	—	December 29, 2008	Mount Lemmon	Mount Lemmon Survey	·	1.6 km	MPC · JPL
356617	2011 UX_{13}	—	August 6, 2002	Palomar	NEAT	·	1.5 km	MPC · JPL
356618	2011 UT_{14}	—	September 23, 1997	Kitt Peak	Spacewatch	·	1.0 km	MPC · JPL
356619	2011 UT_{15}	—	October 21, 2006	Mount Lemmon	Mount Lemmon Survey	·	2.7 km	MPC · JPL
356620	2011 UH_{17}	—	August 30, 2005	Kitt Peak	Spacewatch	·	2.5 km	MPC · JPL
356621	2011 UP_{17}	—	October 21, 2003	Kitt Peak	Spacewatch	PHO	1.8 km	MPC · JPL
356622	2011 UQ_{17}	—	February 11, 2004	Palomar	NEAT	·	2.1 km	MPC · JPL
356623	2011 US_{17}	—	July 6, 2002	Kitt Peak	Spacewatch	·	1.8 km	MPC · JPL
356624	2011 UV_{19}	—	September 27, 2006	Mount Lemmon	Mount Lemmon Survey	·	2.5 km	MPC · JPL
356625	2011 UF_{22}	—	March 10, 2005	Mount Lemmon	Mount Lemmon Survey	·	2.2 km	MPC · JPL
356626	2011 UH_{23}	—	April 2, 2009	Mount Lemmon	Mount Lemmon Survey	·	2.6 km	MPC · JPL
356627	2011 UF_{26}	—	September 27, 2006	Kitt Peak	Spacewatch	·	2.4 km	MPC · JPL
356628	2011 UP_{26}	—	September 25, 2006	Kitt Peak	Spacewatch	·	2.1 km	MPC · JPL
356629	2011 UZ_{28}	—	February 28, 2008	Mount Lemmon	Mount Lemmon Survey	·	2.7 km	MPC · JPL
356630	2011 US_{32}	—	September 23, 2006	San Marcello	San Marcello	·	2.2 km	MPC · JPL
356631	2011 UH_{34}	—	September 24, 2006	Kitt Peak	Spacewatch	KOR	1.3 km	MPC · JPL
356632	2011 UB_{36}	—	October 20, 2006	Kitt Peak	Spacewatch	KOR	1.4 km	MPC · JPL
356633	2011 UV_{37}	—	July 9, 2005	Kitt Peak	Spacewatch	·	1.9 km	MPC · JPL
356634	2011 UC_{38}	—	October 6, 2005	Kitt Peak	Spacewatch	·	3.1 km	MPC · JPL
356635	2011 UO_{38}	—	July 25, 2006	Mount Lemmon	Mount Lemmon Survey	·	1.9 km	MPC · JPL
356636	2011 UM_{39}	—	October 11, 2004	Kitt Peak	Spacewatch	·	1.2 km	MPC · JPL
356637	2011 UO_{39}	—	June 29, 2005	Kitt Peak	Spacewatch	·	2.2 km	MPC · JPL
356638	2011 UJ_{42}	—	November 20, 2003	Socorro	LINEAR	·	1.7 km	MPC · JPL
356639	2011 UB_{45}	—	January 22, 2006	Mount Lemmon	Mount Lemmon Survey	·	1.1 km	MPC · JPL
356640	2011 UC_{45}	—	November 29, 1997	Kitt Peak	Spacewatch	·	2.8 km	MPC · JPL
356641	2011 UE_{45}	—	July 6, 2003	Kitt Peak	Spacewatch	·	1.6 km	MPC · JPL
356642	2011 UL_{48}	—	March 15, 2004	Kitt Peak	Spacewatch	AGN	1.1 km	MPC · JPL
356643	2011 UN_{48}	—	August 21, 2006	Kitt Peak	Spacewatch	WIT	1.2 km	MPC · JPL
356644	2011 UZ_{48}	—	April 2, 2005	Kitt Peak	Spacewatch	·	1.6 km	MPC · JPL
356645	2011 UF_{49}	—	November 1, 2000	Kitt Peak	Spacewatch	·	2.7 km	MPC · JPL
356646	2011 UK_{53}	—	June 7, 2010	WISE	WISE	·	5.4 km	MPC · JPL
356647	2011 UN_{53}	—	November 6, 2007	Kitt Peak	Spacewatch	(5)	1.5 km	MPC · JPL
356648	2011 UR_{56}	—	August 18, 2006	Kitt Peak	Spacewatch	·	1.9 km	MPC · JPL
356649	2011 UG_{61}	—	December 9, 2006	Kitt Peak	Spacewatch	·	2.2 km	MPC · JPL
356650	2011 UH_{61}	—	July 15, 2004	Siding Spring	SSS	·	4.4 km	MPC · JPL
356651	2011 UK_{61}	—	June 2, 2010	WISE	WISE	CYB	3.2 km	MPC · JPL
356652	2011 UX_{61}	—	October 31, 2006	Mount Lemmon	Mount Lemmon Survey	KOR	1.5 km	MPC · JPL
356653	2011 UF_{62}	—	April 20, 2006	Kitt Peak	Spacewatch	·	1.7 km	MPC · JPL
356654	2011 US_{65}	—	September 28, 2006	Mount Lemmon	Mount Lemmon Survey	EOS	2.0 km	MPC · JPL
356655	2011 UT_{65}	—	March 26, 1996	Kitt Peak	Spacewatch	·	1.2 km	MPC · JPL
356656	2011 UG_{67}	—	September 14, 2006	Palomar	NEAT	AGN	1.3 km	MPC · JPL
356657	2011 US_{67}	—	November 24, 2006	Mount Lemmon	Mount Lemmon Survey	·	2.3 km	MPC · JPL
356658	2011 UT_{71}	—	October 4, 2002	Socorro	LINEAR	·	1.9 km	MPC · JPL
356659	2011 UO_{72}	—	November 11, 2007	Mount Lemmon	Mount Lemmon Survey	·	1.8 km	MPC · JPL
356660	2011 UR_{73}	—	March 18, 2009	Kitt Peak	Spacewatch	·	2.2 km	MPC · JPL
356661	2011 UY_{74}	—	October 21, 2006	Mount Lemmon	Mount Lemmon Survey	·	2.0 km	MPC · JPL
356662	2011 UW_{75}	—	September 24, 2005	Kitt Peak	Spacewatch	VER	2.5 km	MPC · JPL
356663	2011 US_{76}	—	September 18, 2003	Kitt Peak	Spacewatch	·	1.2 km	MPC · JPL
356664	2011 UA_{77}	—	August 27, 2006	Kitt Peak	Spacewatch	·	2.1 km	MPC · JPL
356665	2011 UJ_{77}	—	August 23, 2007	Kitt Peak	Spacewatch	·	1.1 km	MPC · JPL
356666	2011 UN_{77}	—	August 30, 2005	Kitt Peak	Spacewatch	·	2.6 km	MPC · JPL
356667	2011 UY_{77}	—	September 26, 2006	Kitt Peak	Spacewatch	·	2.1 km	MPC · JPL
356668	2011 UO_{80}	—	October 22, 2006	Mount Lemmon	Mount Lemmon Survey	·	2.3 km	MPC · JPL
356669	2011 UB_{82}	—	September 14, 2006	Kitt Peak	Spacewatch	AST	1.9 km	MPC · JPL
356670	2011 UM_{82}	—	October 1, 2005	Kitt Peak	Spacewatch	·	3.3 km	MPC · JPL
356671	2011 US_{84}	—	May 19, 2010	WISE	WISE	·	3.8 km	MPC · JPL
356672	2011 UL_{86}	—	September 17, 2006	Kitt Peak	Spacewatch	·	1.8 km	MPC · JPL
356673	2011 UP_{87}	—	December 13, 2006	Kitt Peak	Spacewatch	·	2.8 km	MPC · JPL
356674	2011 UQ_{87}	—	February 3, 2008	Catalina	CSS	·	2.2 km	MPC · JPL
356675	2011 UZ_{89}	—	October 1, 2005	Kitt Peak	Spacewatch	·	2.5 km	MPC · JPL
356676	2011 UA_{91}	—	January 16, 2008	Kitt Peak	Spacewatch	·	2.5 km	MPC · JPL
356677	2011 UR_{93}	—	April 4, 2002	Palomar	NEAT	·	1.4 km	MPC · JPL
356678	2011 UB_{94}	—	March 13, 2005	Kitt Peak	Spacewatch	·	1.4 km	MPC · JPL
356679	2011 UW_{97}	—	August 30, 1998	Kitt Peak	Spacewatch	·	1.4 km	MPC · JPL
356680	2011 UD_{99}	—	November 23, 2006	Kitt Peak	Spacewatch	·	2.1 km	MPC · JPL
356681	2011 UN_{101}	—	March 21, 2004	Kitt Peak	Spacewatch	·	2.2 km	MPC · JPL
356682	2011 UL_{103}	—	November 17, 2006	Mount Lemmon	Mount Lemmon Survey	EOS	2.5 km	MPC · JPL
356683	2011 UL_{104}	—	August 28, 2006	Kitt Peak	Spacewatch	·	2.2 km	MPC · JPL
356684	2011 US_{107}	—	June 5, 2005	Kitt Peak	Spacewatch	·	2.1 km	MPC · JPL
356685	2011 UT_{111}	—	October 22, 2011	Scranton	G. Hug	·	2.9 km	MPC · JPL
356686	2011 UF_{113}	—	April 15, 2005	Kitt Peak	Spacewatch	·	1.8 km	MPC · JPL
356687	2011 UK_{117}	—	February 9, 2008	Mount Lemmon	Mount Lemmon Survey	·	2.8 km	MPC · JPL
356688	2011 UB_{121}	—	January 22, 2004	Socorro	LINEAR	·	3.0 km	MPC · JPL
356689	2011 UF_{123}	—	April 19, 2004	Kitt Peak	Spacewatch	·	2.0 km	MPC · JPL
356690	2011 UG_{123}	—	February 24, 2009	Kitt Peak	Spacewatch	·	1.7 km	MPC · JPL
356691	2011 UR_{124}	—	April 16, 2010	WISE	WISE	·	3.2 km	MPC · JPL
356692	2011 UF_{125}	—	October 21, 1993	Kitt Peak	Spacewatch	·	1.7 km	MPC · JPL
356693	2011 UA_{128}	—	November 28, 2000	Kitt Peak	Spacewatch	·	3.4 km	MPC · JPL
356694	2011 UL_{134}	—	September 18, 2006	Catalina	CSS	·	2.5 km	MPC · JPL
356695	2011 UM_{136}	—	February 12, 2000	Apache Point	SDSS	·	1.7 km	MPC · JPL
356696	2011 UL_{137}	—	November 12, 2006	Mount Lemmon	Mount Lemmon Survey	·	2.3 km	MPC · JPL
356697	2011 UW_{137}	—	September 1, 2005	Kitt Peak	Spacewatch	·	2.9 km	MPC · JPL
356698	2011 UM_{138}	—	September 24, 2005	Kitt Peak	Spacewatch	·	2.6 km	MPC · JPL
356699	2011 US_{138}	—	August 29, 2006	Catalina	CSS	·	1.9 km	MPC · JPL
356700	2011 UD_{140}	—	November 18, 2006	Kitt Peak	Spacewatch	·	1.9 km	MPC · JPL

== 356701–356800 ==
back to top

Designation			Discovery			Properties		Ref
Permanent	Provisional	Named after	Date	Site	Discoverer(s)	Category	Diam.	Ref
356701	2011 UM_{140}	—	August 15, 2002	Kitt Peak	Spacewatch	·	1.3 km	MPC · JPL
356702	2011 UH_{141}	—	November 1, 2000	Socorro	LINEAR	TIR	3.7 km	MPC · JPL
356703	2011 UV_{141}	—	December 4, 2007	Mount Lemmon	Mount Lemmon Survey	HOF	2.8 km	MPC · JPL
356704	2011 UF_{142}	—	November 22, 1998	Kitt Peak	Spacewatch	·	2.0 km	MPC · JPL
356705	2011 UH_{143}	—	April 19, 2009	Kitt Peak	Spacewatch	EOS	2.1 km	MPC · JPL
356706	2011 UZ_{143}	—	January 19, 2008	Mount Lemmon	Mount Lemmon Survey	EMA	3.3 km	MPC · JPL
356707	2011 UG_{149}	—	June 27, 2005	Kitt Peak	Spacewatch	·	2.5 km	MPC · JPL
356708	2011 UQ_{149}	—	March 26, 2006	Kitt Peak	Spacewatch	·	1.6 km	MPC · JPL
356709	2011 UC_{151}	—	March 22, 2006	Catalina	CSS	·	1.3 km	MPC · JPL
356710	2011 UK_{153}	—	September 16, 2010	Mount Lemmon	Mount Lemmon Survey	EOS	2.7 km	MPC · JPL
356711	2011 UH_{159}	—	November 19, 2000	Kitt Peak	Spacewatch	·	2.9 km	MPC · JPL
356712	2011 UC_{160}	—	November 29, 2000	Socorro	LINEAR	EUP	5.1 km	MPC · JPL
356713	2011 UK_{160}	—	April 10, 2003	Kitt Peak	Spacewatch	·	1.4 km	MPC · JPL
356714	2011 UZ_{162}	—	July 4, 2005	Palomar	NEAT	·	2.7 km	MPC · JPL
356715	2011 UY_{163}	—	August 28, 2005	Kitt Peak	Spacewatch	HYG	2.6 km	MPC · JPL
356716	2011 UG_{164}	—	April 1, 2003	Apache Point	SDSS	EOS	2.3 km	MPC · JPL
356717	2011 UO_{173}	—	February 20, 2009	Kitt Peak	Spacewatch	·	2.5 km	MPC · JPL
356718	2011 UN_{174}	—	April 10, 2003	Kitt Peak	Spacewatch	EOS	2.5 km	MPC · JPL
356719	2011 UT_{175}	—	January 7, 2006	Mount Lemmon	Mount Lemmon Survey	·	970 m	MPC · JPL
356720	2011 UX_{175}	—	September 12, 2002	Palomar	NEAT	·	1.7 km	MPC · JPL
356721	2011 UK_{176}	—	March 12, 2005	Kitt Peak	Spacewatch	·	1.4 km	MPC · JPL
356722	2011 US_{176}	—	December 5, 2002	Kitt Peak	Spacewatch	·	2.6 km	MPC · JPL
356723	2011 UB_{178}	—	August 28, 2005	Kitt Peak	Spacewatch	·	2.5 km	MPC · JPL
356724	2011 UT_{179}	—	September 23, 2005	Kitt Peak	Spacewatch	·	3.3 km	MPC · JPL
356725	2011 UB_{181}	—	December 13, 2006	Kitt Peak	Spacewatch	·	2.4 km	MPC · JPL
356726	2011 UO_{181}	—	November 1, 2007	Kitt Peak	Spacewatch	·	1.4 km	MPC · JPL
356727	2011 UW_{183}	—	March 11, 2005	Kitt Peak	Spacewatch	·	1.6 km	MPC · JPL
356728	2011 UP_{185}	—	February 10, 2002	Socorro	LINEAR	·	2.8 km	MPC · JPL
356729	2011 UM_{187}	—	October 3, 2002	Palomar	NEAT	·	3.0 km	MPC · JPL
356730	2011 US_{190}	—	July 26, 2005	Palomar	NEAT	·	3.6 km	MPC · JPL
356731	2011 UT_{190}	—	January 19, 2001	Socorro	LINEAR	NYS	1.4 km	MPC · JPL
356732	2011 UJ_{191}	—	August 26, 2005	Palomar	NEAT	·	3.0 km	MPC · JPL
356733	2011 UQ_{193}	—	July 1, 2005	Kitt Peak	Spacewatch	THM	2.1 km	MPC · JPL
356734	2011 UM_{194}	—	March 25, 2003	Kitt Peak	Spacewatch	EOS	2.3 km	MPC · JPL
356735	2011 UP_{195}	—	September 15, 2006	Kitt Peak	Spacewatch	WIT	950 m	MPC · JPL
356736	2011 UH_{197}	—	January 26, 2006	Kitt Peak	Spacewatch	·	860 m	MPC · JPL
356737	2011 UL_{199}	—	November 18, 2006	Kitt Peak	Spacewatch	EOS ·	2.9 km	MPC · JPL
356738	2011 UE_{201}	—	May 19, 2010	Mount Lemmon	Mount Lemmon Survey	·	1.8 km	MPC · JPL
356739	2011 UH_{202}	—	August 30, 2005	Kitt Peak	Spacewatch	·	2.4 km	MPC · JPL
356740	2011 UE_{203}	—	September 25, 2006	Anderson Mesa	LONEOS	·	2.2 km	MPC · JPL
356741	2011 UZ_{204}	—	June 18, 2010	Mount Lemmon	Mount Lemmon Survey	·	2.9 km	MPC · JPL
356742	2011 UC_{207}	—	August 28, 2006	Catalina	CSS	·	2.0 km	MPC · JPL
356743	2011 UL_{207}	—	October 9, 2007	Kitt Peak	Spacewatch	·	980 m	MPC · JPL
356744	2011 UG_{209}	—	October 18, 2007	Kitt Peak	Spacewatch	·	1.8 km	MPC · JPL
356745	2011 UZ_{212}	—	December 21, 2003	Kitt Peak	Spacewatch	·	1.7 km	MPC · JPL
356746	2011 UT_{216}	—	November 20, 2006	Kitt Peak	Spacewatch	·	2.1 km	MPC · JPL
356747	2011 UZ_{216}	—	September 26, 2005	Kitt Peak	Spacewatch	·	2.5 km	MPC · JPL
356748	2011 UA_{224}	—	September 11, 2002	Palomar	NEAT	·	1.6 km	MPC · JPL
356749	2011 UU_{235}	—	December 28, 2007	Kitt Peak	Spacewatch	·	1.7 km	MPC · JPL
356750	2011 UY_{237}	—	August 19, 2006	Kitt Peak	Spacewatch	·	1.8 km	MPC · JPL
356751	2011 UD_{239}	—	August 19, 2006	Kitt Peak	Spacewatch	·	1.7 km	MPC · JPL
356752	2011 UB_{240}	—	October 1, 2005	Kitt Peak	Spacewatch	·	3.0 km	MPC · JPL
356753	2011 UX_{243}	—	September 12, 2007	Kitt Peak	Spacewatch	·	750 m	MPC · JPL
356754	2011 UY_{243}	—	September 30, 2005	Mount Lemmon	Mount Lemmon Survey	THM	2.3 km	MPC · JPL
356755	2011 UR_{248}	—	October 9, 2005	Kitt Peak	Spacewatch	·	2.5 km	MPC · JPL
356756	2011 UP_{249}	—	October 30, 2005	Kitt Peak	Spacewatch	·	3.6 km	MPC · JPL
356757	2011 UY_{249}	—	September 25, 2006	Kitt Peak	Spacewatch	HOF	2.4 km	MPC · JPL
356758	2011 UP_{250}	—	October 9, 2005	Kitt Peak	Spacewatch	·	2.7 km	MPC · JPL
356759	2011 UZ_{250}	—	October 11, 2001	Palomar	NEAT	·	1.9 km	MPC · JPL
356760	2011 UU_{254}	—	August 19, 2006	Kitt Peak	Spacewatch	·	2.2 km	MPC · JPL
356761	2011 UV_{254}	—	April 14, 2008	Mount Lemmon	Mount Lemmon Survey	LIX	4.5 km	MPC · JPL
356762	2011 UJ_{256}	—	September 21, 2000	Haleakala	NEAT	·	1.5 km	MPC · JPL
356763	2011 UJ_{258}	—	November 24, 2000	Kitt Peak	Spacewatch	HYG	2.8 km	MPC · JPL
356764	2011 UP_{261}	—	December 16, 2007	Mount Lemmon	Mount Lemmon Survey	·	1.7 km	MPC · JPL
356765	2011 UU_{262}	—	October 13, 2006	Kitt Peak	Spacewatch	·	1.8 km	MPC · JPL
356766	2011 UT_{269}	—	December 28, 2003	Kitt Peak	Spacewatch	·	1.9 km	MPC · JPL
356767	2011 UF_{270}	—	March 3, 2009	Mount Lemmon	Mount Lemmon Survey	NEM	2.6 km	MPC · JPL
356768	2011 UZ_{274}	—	January 15, 2004	Kitt Peak	Spacewatch	·	1.7 km	MPC · JPL
356769	2011 UR_{275}	—	February 28, 2008	Kitt Peak	Spacewatch	HYG	2.8 km	MPC · JPL
356770	2011 UE_{278}	—	October 9, 2007	Kitt Peak	Spacewatch	·	1.8 km	MPC · JPL
356771	2011 UM_{278}	—	September 28, 2006	Kitt Peak	Spacewatch	EMA	3.2 km	MPC · JPL
356772	2011 UV_{279}	—	December 21, 2006	Kitt Peak	Spacewatch	·	2.3 km	MPC · JPL
356773	2011 UR_{280}	—	August 28, 2006	Kitt Peak	Spacewatch	·	2.0 km	MPC · JPL
356774	2011 UT_{280}	—	October 1, 2011	Kitt Peak	Spacewatch	·	2.6 km	MPC · JPL
356775	2011 UL_{281}	—	June 19, 2010	WISE	WISE	·	4.3 km	MPC · JPL
356776	2011 UF_{282}	—	August 21, 2006	Kitt Peak	Spacewatch	·	1.8 km	MPC · JPL
356777	2011 UD_{283}	—	February 9, 2008	Mount Lemmon	Mount Lemmon Survey	HYG	2.7 km	MPC · JPL
356778	2011 UA_{291}	—	September 12, 2001	Kitt Peak	Spacewatch	KOR	1.3 km	MPC · JPL
356779	2011 UU_{295}	—	August 21, 2006	Kitt Peak	Spacewatch	HOF	2.6 km	MPC · JPL
356780	2011 UQ_{296}	—	February 29, 2008	Catalina	CSS	·	3.9 km	MPC · JPL
356781	2011 UQ_{301}	—	December 30, 2007	Kitt Peak	Spacewatch	·	2.4 km	MPC · JPL
356782	2011 UJ_{302}	—	December 14, 2007	Mount Lemmon	Mount Lemmon Survey	·	3.3 km	MPC · JPL
356783	2011 UT_{303}	—	March 10, 2000	Kitt Peak	Spacewatch	·	800 m	MPC · JPL
356784	2011 UU_{303}	—	March 8, 2005	Mount Lemmon	Mount Lemmon Survey	·	1.5 km	MPC · JPL
356785	2011 UO_{304}	—	August 29, 2006	Kitt Peak	Spacewatch	·	2.1 km	MPC · JPL
356786 Shuike	2011 UU_{306}	Shuike	November 9, 2007	XuYi	PMO NEO Survey Program	BRG	1.8 km	MPC · JPL
356787	2011 UF_{309}	—	December 5, 2007	Kitt Peak	Spacewatch	HOF	2.7 km	MPC · JPL
356788	2011 UC_{312}	—	May 4, 2005	Mount Lemmon	Mount Lemmon Survey	·	1.9 km	MPC · JPL
356789	2011 UL_{313}	—	February 18, 2005	La Silla	A. Boattini, H. Scholl	·	1.9 km	MPC · JPL
356790	2011 UT_{313}	—	November 20, 2006	Kitt Peak	Spacewatch	·	2.9 km	MPC · JPL
356791	2011 UK_{314}	—	September 27, 2006	Kitt Peak	Spacewatch	KOR	1.2 km	MPC · JPL
356792	2011 UA_{315}	—	October 21, 1995	Kitt Peak	Spacewatch	3:2 · SHU	4.1 km	MPC · JPL
356793	2011 UM_{319}	—	April 5, 2005	Mount Lemmon	Mount Lemmon Survey	·	1.8 km	MPC · JPL
356794	2011 UP_{319}	—	September 30, 2006	Mount Lemmon	Mount Lemmon Survey	KOR	1.4 km	MPC · JPL
356795	2011 UX_{322}	—	August 28, 2006	Catalina	CSS	GEF	1.7 km	MPC · JPL
356796	2011 UY_{322}	—	July 25, 2000	Kitt Peak	Spacewatch	·	5.1 km	MPC · JPL
356797	2011 UA_{325}	—	September 19, 2006	Kitt Peak	Spacewatch	HOF	3.1 km	MPC · JPL
356798	2011 UL_{330}	—	February 7, 2008	Mount Lemmon	Mount Lemmon Survey	·	3.0 km	MPC · JPL
356799	2011 UV_{330}	—	September 1, 2005	Kitt Peak	Spacewatch	·	2.7 km	MPC · JPL
356800	2011 UZ_{330}	—	January 20, 2009	Mount Lemmon	Mount Lemmon Survey	MAR	1.1 km	MPC · JPL

== 356801–356900 ==
back to top

Designation			Discovery			Properties		Ref
Permanent	Provisional	Named after	Date	Site	Discoverer(s)	Category	Diam.	Ref
356801	2011 UG_{331}	—	October 1, 2005	Kitt Peak	Spacewatch	·	2.5 km	MPC · JPL
356802	2011 UK_{335}	—	July 5, 2005	Mount Lemmon	Mount Lemmon Survey	·	3.0 km	MPC · JPL
356803	2011 UH_{336}	—	August 9, 2004	Campo Imperatore	CINEOS	·	810 m	MPC · JPL
356804	2011 UZ_{337}	—	October 5, 2002	Palomar	NEAT	·	2.0 km	MPC · JPL
356805	2011 UF_{339}	—	May 10, 2005	Kitt Peak	Spacewatch	·	2.0 km	MPC · JPL
356806	2011 UO_{343}	—	March 9, 2005	Catalina	CSS	MAR	1.5 km	MPC · JPL
356807	2011 UV_{343}	—	February 24, 2006	Mount Lemmon	Mount Lemmon Survey	·	940 m	MPC · JPL
356808	2011 UA_{344}	—	November 7, 2007	Kitt Peak	Spacewatch	·	1.9 km	MPC · JPL
356809	2011 UH_{358}	—	October 10, 2007	Catalina	CSS	·	1.5 km	MPC · JPL
356810	2011 US_{359}	—	October 27, 2005	Kitt Peak	Spacewatch	·	3.3 km	MPC · JPL
356811	2011 UD_{362}	—	October 22, 2005	Kitt Peak	Spacewatch	·	4.1 km	MPC · JPL
356812	2011 UE_{369}	—	February 27, 2009	Kitt Peak	Spacewatch	·	1.8 km	MPC · JPL
356813	2011 US_{369}	—	November 11, 2007	Mount Lemmon	Mount Lemmon Survey	·	2.4 km	MPC · JPL
356814	2011 UU_{371}	—	April 4, 2003	Kitt Peak	Spacewatch	·	3.8 km	MPC · JPL
356815	2011 UT_{379}	—	November 21, 2006	Mount Lemmon	Mount Lemmon Survey	·	3.0 km	MPC · JPL
356816	2011 UN_{381}	—	October 3, 2006	Mount Lemmon	Mount Lemmon Survey	KOR	1.3 km	MPC · JPL
356817	2011 UJ_{383}	—	January 19, 2004	Kitt Peak	Spacewatch	·	1.7 km	MPC · JPL
356818	2011 UT_{383}	—	March 13, 2005	Kitt Peak	Spacewatch	·	1.5 km	MPC · JPL
356819	2011 UC_{389}	—	February 7, 2002	Palomar	NEAT	·	4.0 km	MPC · JPL
356820	2011 UQ_{389}	—	September 17, 2006	Kitt Peak	Spacewatch	HOF	4.0 km	MPC · JPL
356821	2011 UZ_{389}	—	August 27, 2005	Palomar	NEAT	·	2.7 km	MPC · JPL
356822	2011 UD_{391}	—	September 1, 2005	Kitt Peak	Spacewatch	·	3.8 km	MPC · JPL
356823	2011 UM_{391}	—	May 2, 2005	Kitt Peak	Spacewatch	HNS	1.6 km	MPC · JPL
356824	2011 UN_{391}	—	November 22, 2005	Catalina	CSS	CYB	3.8 km	MPC · JPL
356825	2011 UT_{391}	—	November 22, 2006	Kitt Peak	Spacewatch	·	3.4 km	MPC · JPL
356826	2011 UQ_{398}	—	August 27, 2006	Kitt Peak	Spacewatch	·	2.3 km	MPC · JPL
356827	2011 UY_{401}	—	December 23, 2006	Bergisch Gladbach	W. Bickel	EOS	2.2 km	MPC · JPL
356828	2011 UA_{402}	—	February 2, 2008	Kitt Peak	Spacewatch	·	2.3 km	MPC · JPL
356829	2011 UF_{404}	—	July 29, 2005	Palomar	NEAT	EUP	4.8 km	MPC · JPL
356830	2011 UV_{404}	—	February 10, 2002	Socorro	LINEAR	·	4.1 km	MPC · JPL
356831	2011 US_{407}	—	November 18, 2007	Kitt Peak	Spacewatch	·	1.6 km	MPC · JPL
356832	2011 UA_{408}	—	March 1, 2008	Kitt Peak	Spacewatch	·	3.7 km	MPC · JPL
356833	2011 VL	—	September 1, 2005	Anderson Mesa	LONEOS	·	3.3 km	MPC · JPL
356834	2011 VZ	—	February 28, 2008	Mount Lemmon	Mount Lemmon Survey	·	4.1 km	MPC · JPL
356835	2011 VJ_{1}	—	August 4, 2005	Palomar	NEAT	·	2.8 km	MPC · JPL
356836	2011 VU_{1}	—	January 5, 2002	Kitt Peak	Spacewatch	EOS	2.2 km	MPC · JPL
356837	2011 VV_{6}	—	July 5, 2005	Palomar	NEAT	EOS	2.4 km	MPC · JPL
356838	2011 VZ_{7}	—	September 26, 2006	Catalina	CSS	NEM	2.7 km	MPC · JPL
356839	2011 VB_{14}	—	July 23, 2001	Fort Davis	Ries, J. G.	NEM	2.2 km	MPC · JPL
356840	2011 VL_{15}	—	November 16, 1998	Kitt Peak	Spacewatch	·	1.8 km	MPC · JPL
356841	2011 VM_{22}	—	February 8, 2002	Kitt Peak	Spacewatch	·	2.5 km	MPC · JPL
356842	2011 VP_{22}	—	March 19, 2009	Mount Lemmon	Mount Lemmon Survey	NEM	2.3 km	MPC · JPL
356843	2011 WJ_{2}	—	February 8, 2002	Kitt Peak	Spacewatch	·	3.4 km	MPC · JPL
356844	2011 WE_{3}	—	November 5, 2005	Kitt Peak	Spacewatch	·	3.6 km	MPC · JPL
356845	2011 WQ_{3}	—	March 17, 2004	Kitt Peak	Spacewatch	·	1.9 km	MPC · JPL
356846	2011 WD_{6}	—	April 29, 2003	Kitt Peak	Spacewatch	·	3.3 km	MPC · JPL
356847	2011 WC_{7}	—	October 11, 2005	Kitt Peak	Spacewatch	·	2.7 km	MPC · JPL
356848	2011 WE_{8}	—	October 20, 2006	Kitt Peak	Spacewatch	KOR	1.3 km	MPC · JPL
356849	2011 WM_{9}	—	April 24, 2004	Kitt Peak	Spacewatch	KOR	1.2 km	MPC · JPL
356850	2011 WM_{14}	—	June 8, 2005	Siding Spring	SSS	TIR	5.0 km	MPC · JPL
356851	2011 WT_{24}	—	January 13, 2004	Anderson Mesa	LONEOS	·	4.1 km	MPC · JPL
356852	2011 WY_{24}	—	September 19, 2006	Catalina	CSS	·	2.0 km	MPC · JPL
356853	2011 WR_{27}	—	August 12, 2006	Palomar	NEAT	·	3.3 km	MPC · JPL
356854	2011 WT_{27}	—	November 4, 2007	Kitt Peak	Spacewatch	·	1.1 km	MPC · JPL
356855	2011 WG_{31}	—	September 28, 2006	Kitt Peak	Spacewatch	·	2.5 km	MPC · JPL
356856	2011 WL_{33}	—	June 18, 2010	Mount Lemmon	Mount Lemmon Survey	AGN	1.5 km	MPC · JPL
356857	2011 WL_{44}	—	November 6, 2007	Mount Lemmon	Mount Lemmon Survey	·	2.1 km	MPC · JPL
356858	2011 WU_{46}	—	September 26, 2005	Palomar	NEAT	·	4.7 km	MPC · JPL
356859	2011 WF_{54}	—	September 26, 2006	Catalina	CSS	615	1.8 km	MPC · JPL
356860	2011 WV_{55}	—	March 7, 2008	Mount Lemmon	Mount Lemmon Survey	HYG	3.4 km	MPC · JPL
356861	2011 WD_{61}	—	June 17, 2005	Mount Lemmon	Mount Lemmon Survey	KOR	1.4 km	MPC · JPL
356862	2011 WP_{61}	—	December 1, 2006	Kitt Peak	Spacewatch	·	2.0 km	MPC · JPL
356863 Maathai	2011 WZ_{61}	Maathai	June 25, 2010	WISE	WISE	3:2	5.2 km	MPC · JPL
356864	2011 WW_{64}	—	September 18, 2010	Mount Lemmon	Mount Lemmon Survey	L4	8.4 km	MPC · JPL
356865	2011 WZ_{70}	—	June 17, 2010	WISE	WISE	·	2.9 km	MPC · JPL
356866	2011 WU_{72}	—	December 13, 2006	Mount Lemmon	Mount Lemmon Survey	·	3.5 km	MPC · JPL
356867	2011 WU_{77}	—	September 28, 2006	Kitt Peak	Spacewatch	MRX	1.2 km	MPC · JPL
356868	2011 WJ_{79}	—	May 5, 2008	Mount Lemmon	Mount Lemmon Survey	THB	3.7 km	MPC · JPL
356869	2011 WT_{81}	—	June 13, 2010	Mount Lemmon	Mount Lemmon Survey	·	1.8 km	MPC · JPL
356870	2011 WH_{84}	—	February 14, 2004	Kitt Peak	Spacewatch	·	1.7 km	MPC · JPL
356871	2011 WH_{88}	—	October 16, 2006	Catalina	CSS	·	3.4 km	MPC · JPL
356872	2011 WX_{106}	—	December 18, 2007	Kitt Peak	Spacewatch	·	2.7 km	MPC · JPL
356873	2011 WZ_{113}	—	March 11, 2008	Catalina	CSS	·	6.4 km	MPC · JPL
356874	2011 WA_{114}	—	December 26, 2006	Catalina	CSS	·	4.7 km	MPC · JPL
356875	2011 WL_{114}	—	March 15, 2008	Kitt Peak	Spacewatch	·	5.2 km	MPC · JPL
356876	2011 WM_{117}	—	December 20, 2000	Kitt Peak	Spacewatch	·	4.5 km	MPC · JPL
356877	2011 WN_{119}	—	October 27, 2005	Catalina	CSS	·	4.0 km	MPC · JPL
356878	2011 WC_{125}	—	September 26, 2005	Kitt Peak	Spacewatch	·	3.3 km	MPC · JPL
356879	2011 WJ_{126}	—	April 1, 2008	Mount Lemmon	Mount Lemmon Survey	·	4.3 km	MPC · JPL
356880	2011 WU_{127}	—	March 23, 2003	Apache Point	SDSS	·	4.5 km	MPC · JPL
356881	2011 WG_{129}	—	October 25, 2005	Mount Lemmon	Mount Lemmon Survey	·	2.5 km	MPC · JPL
356882	2011 WJ_{132}	—	April 5, 2005	Palomar	NEAT	ADE	2.9 km	MPC · JPL
356883	2011 WW_{132}	—	September 15, 2004	Kitt Peak	Spacewatch	CYB	4.6 km	MPC · JPL
356884	2011 WH_{134}	—	April 6, 2005	Catalina	CSS	·	1.9 km	MPC · JPL
356885	2011 WL_{138}	—	March 15, 2004	Kitt Peak	Spacewatch	MRX	1.3 km	MPC · JPL
356886	2011 WE_{146}	—	February 6, 2002	Socorro	LINEAR	·	4.7 km	MPC · JPL
356887	2011 WF_{148}	—	September 1, 2005	Kitt Peak	Spacewatch	·	2.7 km	MPC · JPL
356888	2011 WV_{150}	—	February 16, 2004	Kitt Peak	Spacewatch	·	2.6 km	MPC · JPL
356889	2011 WE_{152}	—	July 9, 2005	Kitt Peak	Spacewatch	NAE	3.5 km	MPC · JPL
356890	2011 WP_{153}	—	March 11, 2002	Palomar	NEAT	·	3.9 km	MPC · JPL
356891	2011 XN	—	April 20, 2006	Mount Lemmon	Mount Lemmon Survey	·	2.2 km	MPC · JPL
356892	2011 XT	—	June 12, 2005	Kitt Peak	Spacewatch	·	2.1 km	MPC · JPL
356893	2011 XL_{3}	—	February 14, 2002	Kitt Peak	Spacewatch	L4	10 km	MPC · JPL
356894	2011 YN_{15}	—	November 21, 2006	Mount Lemmon	Mount Lemmon Survey	·	3.7 km	MPC · JPL
356895	2011 YO_{16}	—	December 12, 1999	Socorro	LINEAR	L4	10 km	MPC · JPL
356896	2011 YX_{20}	—	October 10, 2008	Mount Lemmon	Mount Lemmon Survey	L4	10 km	MPC · JPL
356897	2011 YQ_{28}	—	November 24, 2009	Catalina	CSS	L4	15 km	MPC · JPL
356898	2011 YT_{29}	—	September 29, 2009	Mount Lemmon	Mount Lemmon Survey	L4	7.7 km	MPC · JPL
356899	2011 YL_{42}	—	July 29, 2008	Kitt Peak	Spacewatch	L4	9.9 km	MPC · JPL
356900	2011 YN_{43}	—	January 5, 2000	Kitt Peak	Spacewatch	L4	8.3 km	MPC · JPL

== 356901–357000 ==
back to top

Designation			Discovery			Properties		Ref
Permanent	Provisional	Named after	Date	Site	Discoverer(s)	Category	Diam.	Ref
356901	2011 YJ_{55}	—	January 12, 2000	Kitt Peak	Spacewatch	L4	10 km	MPC · JPL
356902	2011 YF_{56}	—	September 5, 2008	Kitt Peak	Spacewatch	L4 · ERY	7.7 km	MPC · JPL
356903	2011 YH_{71}	—	May 27, 2003	Kitt Peak	Spacewatch	L4	10 km	MPC · JPL
356904	2011 YT_{71}	—	October 29, 2010	Kitt Peak	Spacewatch	L4	10 km	MPC · JPL
356905	2011 YC_{75}	—	October 1, 2009	Mount Lemmon	Mount Lemmon Survey	L4 · (8060)	8.2 km	MPC · JPL
356906	2011 YE_{75}	—	March 21, 2002	Kitt Peak	Spacewatch	L4	9.1 km	MPC · JPL
356907	2011 YW_{76}	—	May 25, 2007	Kitt Peak	Spacewatch	L4	8.8 km	MPC · JPL
356908	2012 AE_{4}	—	November 25, 2005	Catalina	CSS	·	4.1 km	MPC · JPL
356909	2012 AP_{14}	—	April 22, 2004	Apache Point	SDSS	L4	10 km	MPC · JPL
356910	2012 AA_{17}	—	February 8, 2010	WISE	WISE	L4	10 km	MPC · JPL
356911	2012 BQ_{5}	—	September 5, 2008	Kitt Peak	Spacewatch	L4	8.5 km	MPC · JPL
356912	2012 BW_{36}	—	September 5, 2008	Kitt Peak	Spacewatch	L4	10 km	MPC · JPL
356913	2012 BQ_{50}	—	October 17, 2008	Kitt Peak	Spacewatch	L4 · (8060)	8.9 km	MPC · JPL
356914	2012 BJ_{57}	—	October 6, 2008	Mount Lemmon	Mount Lemmon Survey	L4	9.2 km	MPC · JPL
356915	2012 BG_{61}	—	September 11, 2007	Mount Lemmon	Mount Lemmon Survey	L4	7.9 km	MPC · JPL
356916	2012 BH_{61}	—	February 21, 2001	Kitt Peak	Spacewatch	L4	8.3 km	MPC · JPL
356917	2012 BX_{105}	—	September 13, 2004	Kitt Peak	Spacewatch	·	2.4 km	MPC · JPL
356918	2012 BF_{119}	—	January 16, 2000	Kitt Peak	Spacewatch	L4	7.9 km	MPC · JPL
356919	2012 BL_{126}	—	October 4, 2004	Palomar	NEAT	EOS	2.8 km	MPC · JPL
356920	2012 BC_{139}	—	September 17, 2004	Kitt Peak	Spacewatch	·	2.9 km	MPC · JPL
356921	2012 CL	—	January 4, 2006	Mount Lemmon	Mount Lemmon Survey	·	3.9 km	MPC · JPL
356922	2012 CP_{5}	—	April 12, 2002	Palomar	NEAT	EOS	2.4 km	MPC · JPL
356923	2012 CP_{51}	—	September 28, 2009	Mount Lemmon	Mount Lemmon Survey	·	3.8 km	MPC · JPL
356924	2012 CJ_{54}	—	October 15, 2001	Palomar	NEAT	·	2.4 km	MPC · JPL
356925	2012 QP_{37}	—	June 29, 2005	Catalina	CSS	·	1.1 km	MPC · JPL
356926	2012 RM_{13}	—	February 2, 2005	Kitt Peak	Spacewatch	·	3.1 km	MPC · JPL
356927	2012 RV_{22}	—	April 11, 2003	Kitt Peak	Spacewatch	·	2.0 km	MPC · JPL
356928	2012 RG_{31}	—	October 9, 1999	Socorro	LINEAR	·	2.5 km	MPC · JPL
356929	2012 RC_{36}	—	March 12, 2007	Mount Lemmon	Mount Lemmon Survey	·	1.7 km	MPC · JPL
356930	2012 SG_{13}	—	March 26, 2001	Kitt Peak	Deep Ecliptic Survey	AGN	1.3 km	MPC · JPL
356931	2012 SM_{13}	—	April 6, 2005	Mount Lemmon	Mount Lemmon Survey	KOR	1.4 km	MPC · JPL
356932	2012 SE_{30}	—	October 10, 2002	Apache Point	SDSS	KOR	1.5 km	MPC · JPL
356933	2012 SX_{58}	—	June 1, 2006	Mount Lemmon	Mount Lemmon Survey	·	3.4 km	MPC · JPL
356934	2012 TB_{15}	—	March 19, 2007	Mount Lemmon	Mount Lemmon Survey	L5	10 km	MPC · JPL
356935	2012 TV_{56}	—	November 19, 2001	Socorro	LINEAR	·	3.3 km	MPC · JPL
356936	2012 TP_{90}	—	December 18, 2001	Socorro	LINEAR	·	2.6 km	MPC · JPL
356937	2012 TO_{150}	—	September 19, 2001	Socorro	LINEAR	·	980 m	MPC · JPL
356938	2012 TT_{150}	—	December 15, 2004	Kitt Peak	Spacewatch	·	1.8 km	MPC · JPL
356939	2012 TQ_{187}	—	March 30, 2008	Kitt Peak	Spacewatch	·	920 m	MPC · JPL
356940	2012 TX_{199}	—	August 25, 1995	Kitt Peak	Spacewatch	·	3.6 km	MPC · JPL
356941	2012 TA_{234}	—	September 22, 2003	Palomar	NEAT	·	2.4 km	MPC · JPL
356942	2012 TO_{286}	—	September 28, 2006	Kitt Peak	Spacewatch	·	3.1 km	MPC · JPL
356943	2012 TB_{302}	—	October 25, 2003	Socorro	LINEAR	PAD	2.2 km	MPC · JPL
356944	2012 TS_{315}	—	January 6, 2005	Catalina	CSS	·	2.1 km	MPC · JPL
356945	2012 UN_{31}	—	September 15, 2007	Mount Lemmon	Mount Lemmon Survey	EOS	2.2 km	MPC · JPL
356946	2012 UW_{69}	—	March 11, 2005	Mount Lemmon	Mount Lemmon Survey	·	2.3 km	MPC · JPL
356947	2012 UO_{74}	—	October 1, 2005	Catalina	CSS	·	820 m	MPC · JPL
356948	2012 VE_{5}	—	September 22, 2009	Mount Lemmon	Mount Lemmon Survey	·	570 m	MPC · JPL
356949	2012 VU_{19}	—	February 10, 2002	Socorro	LINEAR	MAS	790 m	MPC · JPL
356950	2012 VF_{75}	—	October 14, 2001	Socorro	LINEAR	TIR	4.1 km	MPC · JPL
356951	2012 VS_{101}	—	April 28, 2003	Anderson Mesa	LONEOS	H	650 m	MPC · JPL
356952	2012 WK_{9}	—	November 24, 2003	Kitt Peak	Spacewatch	NEM	2.6 km	MPC · JPL
356953	2012 WV_{10}	—	September 16, 2006	Catalina	CSS	·	3.9 km	MPC · JPL
356954	2012 WF_{23}	—	December 12, 2004	Kitt Peak	Spacewatch	(5)	1.6 km	MPC · JPL
356955	2012 WT_{26}	—	July 22, 2003	Haleakala	NEAT	·	2.0 km	MPC · JPL
356956	2012 WO_{27}	—	September 19, 2001	Palomar	NEAT	·	1.2 km	MPC · JPL
356957	2012 XP_{11}	—	September 27, 2000	Kitt Peak	Spacewatch	·	3.8 km	MPC · JPL
356958	2012 XA_{25}	—	November 20, 2003	Socorro	LINEAR	GEF	1.6 km	MPC · JPL
356959	2012 XT_{42}	—	December 11, 2004	Kitt Peak	Spacewatch	·	1.3 km	MPC · JPL
356960	2012 XC_{47}	—	January 12, 2002	Kitt Peak	Spacewatch	·	4.3 km	MPC · JPL
356961	2012 XM_{56}	—	April 19, 2006	Mount Lemmon	Mount Lemmon Survey	H	540 m	MPC · JPL
356962	2012 XG_{120}	—	May 14, 2004	Kitt Peak	Spacewatch	L4	10 km	MPC · JPL
356963	2012 XM_{120}	—	December 14, 2001	Socorro	LINEAR	EOS	2.1 km	MPC · JPL
356964	2012 XK_{133}	—	December 9, 2004	Kitt Peak	Spacewatch	(5)	1.8 km	MPC · JPL
356965	2012 XJ_{136}	—	December 31, 2008	Mount Lemmon	Mount Lemmon Survey	·	1.6 km	MPC · JPL
356966	2012 XM_{136}	—	March 14, 2005	Catalina	CSS	H	800 m	MPC · JPL
356967	2012 XO_{136}	—	March 14, 2002	Socorro	LINEAR	·	2.2 km	MPC · JPL
356968	2012 XP_{144}	—	February 11, 2002	Socorro	LINEAR	HYG	3.4 km	MPC · JPL
356969	2012 XL_{151}	—	November 20, 2008	Mount Lemmon	Mount Lemmon Survey	·	1.2 km	MPC · JPL
356970	1981 EG_{32}	—	March 6, 1981	Siding Spring	S. J. Bus	·	2.2 km	MPC · JPL
356971	1991 TK_{2}	—	October 10, 1991	Palomar	E. F. Helin	·	2.5 km	MPC · JPL
356972	1993 QH	—	August 16, 1993	Kitt Peak	Spacewatch	·	640 m	MPC · JPL
356973	1994 CM_{7}	—	February 15, 1994	Kitt Peak	Spacewatch	·	1.1 km	MPC · JPL
356974	1994 SG_{6}	—	September 28, 1994	Kitt Peak	Spacewatch	EOS	2.0 km	MPC · JPL
356975 Aspriliopacelli	1994 TX_{1}	Aspriliopacelli	October 9, 1994	Stroncone	Santa Lucia	·	6.3 km	MPC · JPL
356976	1995 DU_{6}	—	February 24, 1995	Kitt Peak	Spacewatch	CLO	1.7 km	MPC · JPL
356977	1995 SC_{63}	—	September 25, 1995	Kitt Peak	Spacewatch	·	460 m	MPC · JPL
356978	1995 SM_{64}	—	September 18, 1995	Kitt Peak	Spacewatch	·	1.5 km	MPC · JPL
356979	1995 TR_{11}	—	October 15, 1995	Kitt Peak	Spacewatch	·	540 m	MPC · JPL
356980	1996 AH_{7}	—	January 12, 1996	Kitt Peak	Spacewatch	EOS	2.3 km	MPC · JPL
356981	1996 RS_{8}	—	September 6, 1996	Kitt Peak	Spacewatch	·	810 m	MPC · JPL
356982	1996 RG_{24}	—	September 7, 1996	Nanyo	T. Okuni	·	1.5 km	MPC · JPL
356983	1997 EP_{26}	—	March 4, 1997	Kitt Peak	Spacewatch	·	2.6 km	MPC · JPL
356984	1997 GA_{2}	—	April 7, 1997	Kitt Peak	Spacewatch	·	2.2 km	MPC · JPL
356985	1997 SA	—	September 16, 1997	Modra	A. Galád, Pravda, A.	·	1.4 km	MPC · JPL
356986	1997 SA_{4}	—	September 26, 1997	Ondřejov	P. Pravec	·	1.1 km	MPC · JPL
356987	1997 UJ_{6}	—	October 23, 1997	Kitt Peak	Spacewatch	L4	12 km	MPC · JPL
356988	1998 BC_{31}	—	January 26, 1998	Kitt Peak	Spacewatch	·	960 m	MPC · JPL
356989	1998 FN_{6}	—	March 18, 1998	Kitt Peak	Spacewatch	·	1.3 km	MPC · JPL
356990	1998 KS_{10}	—	May 22, 1998	Kitt Peak	Spacewatch	EOS	2.0 km	MPC · JPL
356991	1998 QA_{1}	—	August 19, 1998	Socorro	LINEAR	APO · PHA	550 m	MPC · JPL
356992	1998 QH_{29}	—	August 22, 1998	Xinglong	SCAP	·	2.0 km	MPC · JPL
356993	1998 RY_{13}	—	September 14, 1998	Kitt Peak	Spacewatch	·	3.5 km	MPC · JPL
356994	1998 RW_{56}	—	September 14, 1998	Socorro	LINEAR	·	680 m	MPC · JPL
356995	1998 ST_{31}	—	September 20, 1998	Kitt Peak	Spacewatch	·	1.3 km	MPC · JPL
356996	1998 SZ_{33}	—	September 2, 1998	Kitt Peak	Spacewatch	T_{j} (2.99) · EUP	5.0 km	MPC · JPL
356997	1998 SY_{94}	—	September 26, 1998	Socorro	LINEAR	·	1.4 km	MPC · JPL
356998	1998 SD_{163}	—	September 26, 1998	Socorro	LINEAR	EUP	7.2 km	MPC · JPL
356999	1998 TV_{18}	—	October 14, 1998	Xinglong	SCAP	·	1.5 km	MPC · JPL
357000	1998 UO	—	October 17, 1998	Prescott	P. G. Comba	·	1.7 km	MPC · JPL

back to top

== See also ==
- Meanings of minor-planet names: 356001–357000
