= Meanings of minor-planet names: 356001–357000 =

As minor planet discoveries are confirmed, they are given a permanent number by the IAU's Minor Planet Center (MPC), and the discoverers can then submit names for them, following the IAU's naming conventions. The list below concerns those minor planets in the specified number-range that have received names, and explains the meanings of those names.

Official naming citations of newly named small Solar System bodies are approved and published in a bulletin by IAU's Working Group for Small Bodies Nomenclature (WGSBN). Before May 2021, citations were published in MPC's Minor Planet Circulars for many decades. Recent citations can also be found on the JPL Small-Body Database (SBDB). Until his death in 2016, German astronomer Lutz D. Schmadel compiled these citations into the Dictionary of Minor Planet Names (DMP) and regularly updated the collection.

Based on Paul Herget's The Names of the Minor Planets, Schmadel also researched the unclear origin of numerous asteroids, most of which had been named prior to World War II. This article incorporates text from this source, which is in the public domain: SBDB New namings may only be added to this list below after official publication as the preannouncement of names is condemned. The WGSBN publishes a comprehensive guideline for the naming rules of non-cometary small Solar System bodies.

== 356001–356100 ==
Named minor planet	Provisional	This minor planet was named for...	Ref · Catalog
There are no named minor planets in this number range

== 356101–356200 ==
back to top

Named minor planet	Provisional	This minor planet was named for...	Ref · Catalog
There are no named minor planets in this number range

== 356201–356300 ==
back to top

Named minor planet	Provisional	This minor planet was named for...	Ref · Catalog
356217 Clymene	2009 SK_{277}	Clymene was the wife of Nauplius, and mother of Palamedes, Oeax and Nausimedon. Palamedes joined the Greeks in the expedition against Troy. Name suggested by A. Mimeev.	JPL · 356217

== 356301–356400 ==
back to top

Named minor planet	Provisional	This minor planet was named for...	Ref · Catalog
There are no named minor planets in this number range

== 356401–356500 ==
back to top

Named minor planet	Provisional	This minor planet was named for...	Ref · Catalog
There are no named minor planets in this number range

== 356501–356600 ==
back to top

Named minor planet	Provisional	This minor planet was named for...	Ref · Catalog
There are no named minor planets in this number range

== 356601–356700 ==
back to top

Named minor planet	Provisional	This minor planet was named for...	Ref · Catalog
There are no named minor planets in this number range

== 356701–356800 ==
back to top

Named minor planet	Provisional	This minor planet was named for...	Ref · Catalog
356786 Shuike	2011 UU_{306}	Shuike, the Chinese pronunciation of the acronym for Nanjing Hydraulic Research Institute, has been a pioneer in scientific research since its establishment in 1935.	IAU · 356786

== 356801–356900 ==
back to top

Named minor planet	Provisional	This minor planet was named for...	Ref · Catalog
356863 Maathai	2011 WZ_{61}	Wangari Maathai (1940–2011), the first African woman to receive the Nobel Peace Prize and the first female professor ever in her home country of Kenya.	JPL · 356863

== 356901–357000 ==
back to top

Named minor planet	Provisional	This minor planet was named for...	Ref · Catalog
356975 Aspriliopacelli	1994 TX_{1}	Asprilio Pacelli (1570–1623) was an Italian composer who was Maestro di Cappella at the Collegio Germanico (Rome) from 1595 to 1601, and at Saint Peter's Basilica in 1602. He then was called to Warsaw by King Sigismund to be director of his Royal Chapel in 1603.	IAU · 356975

back to top

Preceded by 355,001–356,000	Meanings of minor-planet names List of minor planets: 356,001–357,000	Succeeded by 357,001–358,000
