= List of minor planets: 892001–893000 =

The following is a partial list of minor planets, running from minor-planet number 892001 through 893000, inclusive. The primary data for this and other partial lists is based on JPL's "Small-Body Orbital Elements" and data available from the Minor Planet Center. Critical list information is also provided by the MPC, unless otherwise specified from Lowell Observatory. A detailed description of the table's columns and additional sources are given on the main page including a complete list of every page in this series, and a statistical break-up on the dynamical classification of minor planets.

Also see the summary list of all named bodies in numerical and alphabetical order, and the corresponding naming citations for the number range of this particular list. New namings may only be added to this list after official publication, as the preannouncement of names is condemned by the Working Group for Small Bodies Nomenclature of the International Astronomical Union.

Near-Earth obj.	MBA (inner)	MBA (outer)	Centaur
Mars-crosser	MBA (middle)	Jupiter trojan	Trans-Neptunian obj.
Unclassified

== 892001–892100 ==
Designation			Discovery			Properties		Ref
Permanent	Provisional	Named after	Date	Site	Discoverer(s)	Category	Diam.	Ref
892001	2015 DS_{194}	—	January 27, 2015	Haleakala	Pan-STARRS 1	·	2.2 km	MPC · JPL
892002	2015 DO_{198}	—	February 20, 2015	Haleakala	Pan-STARRS 1	H	380 m	MPC · JPL
892003	2015 DD_{209}	—	February 23, 2015	Haleakala	Pan-STARRS 1	·	1.8 km	MPC · JPL
892004	2015 DV_{218}	—	January 22, 2015	Haleakala	Pan-STARRS 1	·	2.0 km	MPC · JPL
892005	2015 DD_{222}	—	February 18, 2015	Kitt Peak	Spacewatch	·	840 m	MPC · JPL
892006	2015 DJ_{225}	—	August 29, 2013	Haleakala	Pan-STARRS 1	H	460 m	MPC · JPL
892007	2015 DC_{227}	—	February 16, 2015	Haleakala	Pan-STARRS 1	·	2.0 km	MPC · JPL
892008	2015 DG_{227}	—	February 16, 2015	Haleakala	Pan-STARRS 1	T_{j} (2.99)	1.9 km	MPC · JPL
892009	2015 DJ_{227}	—	February 17, 2015	Haleakala	Pan-STARRS 1	·	2.3 km	MPC · JPL
892010	2015 DL_{227}	—	February 18, 2015	Mount Lemmon	Mount Lemmon Survey	·	2.0 km	MPC · JPL
892011	2015 DP_{227}	—	February 18, 2015	Haleakala	Pan-STARRS 1	·	2.3 km	MPC · JPL
892012	2015 DK_{229}	—	October 11, 2012	Haleakala	Pan-STARRS 1	·	2.0 km	MPC · JPL
892013	2015 DE_{233}	—	February 17, 2015	Haleakala	Pan-STARRS 1	·	1.5 km	MPC · JPL
892014	2015 DJ_{233}	—	January 20, 2009	Mount Lemmon	Mount Lemmon Survey	·	2.1 km	MPC · JPL
892015	2015 DN_{235}	—	January 8, 2011	Mount Lemmon	Mount Lemmon Survey	·	820 m	MPC · JPL
892016	2015 DX_{236}	—	January 21, 2015	Haleakala	Pan-STARRS 1	·	820 m	MPC · JPL
892017	2015 DF_{237}	—	January 2, 2011	Mount Lemmon	Mount Lemmon Survey	MAS	430 m	MPC · JPL
892018	2015 DD_{239}	—	October 3, 2013	Mount Lemmon	Mount Lemmon Survey	·	670 m	MPC · JPL
892019	2015 DV_{246}	—	January 20, 2015	Haleakala	Pan-STARRS 1	·	920 m	MPC · JPL
892020	2015 DZ_{247}	—	February 7, 2011	Mount Lemmon	Mount Lemmon Survey	NYS	730 m	MPC · JPL
892021	2015 DG_{251}	—	June 3, 2016	Haleakala	Pan-STARRS 1	·	930 m	MPC · JPL
892022	2015 DA_{252}	—	February 20, 2015	Haleakala	Pan-STARRS 1	·	860 m	MPC · JPL
892023	2015 DR_{253}	—	February 18, 2015	Mount Lemmon	Mount Lemmon Survey	·	2.0 km	MPC · JPL
892024	2015 DS_{253}	—	February 17, 2015	Haleakala	Pan-STARRS 1	·	880 m	MPC · JPL
892025	2015 DD_{254}	—	February 27, 2015	Haleakala	Pan-STARRS 1	·	2.0 km	MPC · JPL
892026	2015 DL_{254}	—	February 26, 2015	Mount Lemmon	Mount Lemmon Survey	·	630 m	MPC · JPL
892027	2015 DF_{256}	—	February 24, 2015	Haleakala	Pan-STARRS 1	·	740 m	MPC · JPL
892028	2015 DL_{256}	—	February 26, 2015	Mount Lemmon	Mount Lemmon Survey	·	830 m	MPC · JPL
892029	2015 DO_{256}	—	February 17, 2015	Haleakala	Pan-STARRS 1	·	780 m	MPC · JPL
892030	2015 DL_{258}	—	February 19, 2015	Haleakala	Pan-STARRS 1	·	930 m	MPC · JPL
892031	2015 DW_{259}	—	February 20, 2015	Haleakala	Pan-STARRS 1	L4 · HEK	6.1 km	MPC · JPL
892032	2015 DP_{260}	—	January 27, 2015	Haleakala	Pan-STARRS 1	V	400 m	MPC · JPL
892033	2015 DH_{261}	—	February 18, 2015	Haleakala	Pan-STARRS 1	·	1.6 km	MPC · JPL
892034	2015 DB_{262}	—	February 18, 2015	Haleakala	Pan-STARRS 1	VER	1.8 km	MPC · JPL
892035	2015 DC_{262}	—	February 16, 2015	Haleakala	Pan-STARRS 1	(43176)	2.1 km	MPC · JPL
892036	2015 DM_{262}	—	February 16, 2015	Haleakala	Pan-STARRS 1	TIR	1.7 km	MPC · JPL
892037	2015 DQ_{263}	—	February 25, 2015	Kitt Peak	Spacewatch	TIR	1.5 km	MPC · JPL
892038	2015 DU_{263}	—	February 16, 2015	Haleakala	Pan-STARRS 1	·	1.7 km	MPC · JPL
892039	2015 DA_{268}	—	February 16, 2015	Haleakala	Pan-STARRS 1	·	2.1 km	MPC · JPL
892040	2015 DK_{271}	—	February 16, 2015	Haleakala	Pan-STARRS 1	·	1.1 km	MPC · JPL
892041	2015 DB_{272}	—	February 16, 2015	Haleakala	Pan-STARRS 1	·	1.8 km	MPC · JPL
892042	2015 DE_{275}	—	February 16, 2015	Haleakala	Pan-STARRS 1	·	2.1 km	MPC · JPL
892043	2015 DC_{276}	—	February 16, 2015	Haleakala	Pan-STARRS 1	·	1.1 km	MPC · JPL
892044	2015 DL_{278}	—	February 27, 2015	Haleakala	Pan-STARRS 1	·	1.1 km	MPC · JPL
892045	2015 DR_{279}	—	February 20, 2015	Haleakala	Pan-STARRS 1	·	2.5 km	MPC · JPL
892046	2015 DV_{279}	—	February 27, 2015	Haleakala	Pan-STARRS 1	·	1.6 km	MPC · JPL
892047	2015 DS_{280}	—	January 21, 2015	Haleakala	Pan-STARRS 1	·	1.5 km	MPC · JPL
892048	2015 DK_{283}	—	February 24, 2015	Haleakala	Pan-STARRS 1	·	1.0 km	MPC · JPL
892049	2015 DU_{283}	—	February 20, 2015	Haleakala	Pan-STARRS 1	·	2.1 km	MPC · JPL
892050	2015 DG_{284}	—	February 24, 2015	Haleakala	Pan-STARRS 1	·	2.1 km	MPC · JPL
892051	2015 DO_{284}	—	February 16, 2015	Haleakala	Pan-STARRS 1	·	2.1 km	MPC · JPL
892052	2015 DR_{284}	—	January 25, 2015	Haleakala	Pan-STARRS 1	·	2.3 km	MPC · JPL
892053	2015 DS_{284}	—	January 22, 2015	Haleakala	Pan-STARRS 1	·	1.3 km	MPC · JPL
892054	2015 DC_{285}	—	February 16, 2015	Haleakala	Pan-STARRS 1	·	1.9 km	MPC · JPL
892055	2015 DG_{285}	—	January 23, 2015	Haleakala	Pan-STARRS 1	·	2.0 km	MPC · JPL
892056	2015 DM_{285}	—	January 22, 2015	Haleakala	Pan-STARRS 1	EOS	1.4 km	MPC · JPL
892057	2015 DV_{285}	—	January 27, 2015	Haleakala	Pan-STARRS 1	·	2.0 km	MPC · JPL
892058	2015 DZ_{285}	—	February 26, 2015	Kitt Peak	Spacewatch	·	2.1 km	MPC · JPL
892059	2015 DZ_{286}	—	February 16, 2015	Haleakala	Pan-STARRS 1	·	2.1 km	MPC · JPL
892060	2015 DV_{287}	—	February 20, 2015	Haleakala	Pan-STARRS 1	EUN	710 m	MPC · JPL
892061	2015 DQ_{288}	—	February 17, 2015	Haleakala	Pan-STARRS 1	·	2.4 km	MPC · JPL
892062	2015 DR_{288}	—	January 22, 2015	Haleakala	Pan-STARRS 1	·	2.4 km	MPC · JPL
892063	2015 DJ_{289}	—	February 17, 2015	Haleakala	Pan-STARRS 1	·	1.7 km	MPC · JPL
892064	2015 DO_{290}	—	February 16, 2015	Haleakala	Pan-STARRS 1	·	1.8 km	MPC · JPL
892065	2015 DZ_{290}	—	January 27, 2015	Haleakala	Pan-STARRS 1	LIX	2.1 km	MPC · JPL
892066	2015 DB_{291}	—	January 17, 2015	Haleakala	Pan-STARRS 1	·	1.9 km	MPC · JPL
892067	2015 DQ_{292}	—	January 23, 2015	Haleakala	Pan-STARRS 1	·	1.8 km	MPC · JPL
892068	2015 DJ_{294}	—	February 16, 2015	Haleakala	Pan-STARRS 1	·	1.6 km	MPC · JPL
892069	2015 DL_{294}	—	February 16, 2015	Haleakala	Pan-STARRS 1	EOS	1.3 km	MPC · JPL
892070	2015 DS_{294}	—	February 16, 2015	Haleakala	Pan-STARRS 1	·	1.9 km	MPC · JPL
892071	2015 DD_{296}	—	February 27, 2015	Mount Lemmon	Mount Lemmon Survey	H	380 m	MPC · JPL
892072	2015 DA_{299}	—	February 24, 2015	Haleakala	Pan-STARRS 1	·	1.8 km	MPC · JPL
892073	2015 DG_{299}	—	February 16, 2015	Haleakala	Pan-STARRS 1	L4	6.0 km	MPC · JPL
892074	2015 DK_{300}	—	February 17, 2015	Haleakala	Pan-STARRS 1	·	2.1 km	MPC · JPL
892075	2015 DC_{301}	—	February 18, 2015	Haleakala	Pan-STARRS 1	·	2.2 km	MPC · JPL
892076	2015 DD_{302}	—	January 23, 2004	Anderson Mesa	LONEOS	·	900 m	MPC · JPL
892077	2015 DM_{302}	—	February 16, 2015	Haleakala	Pan-STARRS 1	·	1.0 km	MPC · JPL
892078	2015 DZ_{305}	—	February 27, 2015	Haleakala	Pan-STARRS 1	·	1.6 km	MPC · JPL
892079	2015 DW_{313}	—	December 6, 2005	Kitt Peak	Spacewatch	·	1.3 km	MPC · JPL
892080	2015 DP_{314}	—	February 20, 2015	Haleakala	Pan-STARRS 1	·	2.1 km	MPC · JPL
892081	2015 DX_{316}	—	February 20, 2015	Haleakala	Pan-STARRS 1	URS	2.4 km	MPC · JPL
892082	2015 DY_{369}	—	February 18, 2015	Mount Lemmon	Mount Lemmon Survey	·	1.6 km	MPC · JPL
892083	2015 EG_{1}	—	March 9, 2015	Mount Lemmon	Mount Lemmon Survey	·	2.0 km	MPC · JPL
892084	2015 EP_{2}	—	February 17, 2015	Haleakala	Pan-STARRS 1	·	690 m	MPC · JPL
892085	2015 EX_{3}	—	February 27, 2015	Mount Lemmon	Mount Lemmon Survey	·	2.0 km	MPC · JPL
892086	2015 EU_{5}	—	February 16, 2015	Haleakala	Pan-STARRS 1	·	2.0 km	MPC · JPL
892087	2015 EL_{10}	—	January 22, 2015	Haleakala	Pan-STARRS 1	·	2.2 km	MPC · JPL
892088	2015 EM_{13}	—	January 23, 2015	Haleakala	Pan-STARRS 1	·	1.9 km	MPC · JPL
892089	2015 EJ_{18}	—	January 20, 2015	Haleakala	Pan-STARRS 1	ERI	790 m	MPC · JPL
892090	2015 EE_{23}	—	January 29, 2015	Haleakala	Pan-STARRS 1	PHO	720 m	MPC · JPL
892091	2015 EX_{24}	—	April 3, 2008	Kitt Peak	Spacewatch	·	660 m	MPC · JPL
892092	2015 EH_{29}	—	March 14, 2015	Haleakala	Pan-STARRS 1	·	1.7 km	MPC · JPL
892093	2015 EA_{30}	—	January 21, 2015	Haleakala	Pan-STARRS 1	·	900 m	MPC · JPL
892094	2015 EK_{30}	—	January 21, 2015	Haleakala	Pan-STARRS 1	ADE	1.4 km	MPC · JPL
892095	2015 EM_{30}	—	February 10, 2015	Mount Lemmon	Mount Lemmon Survey	·	1.7 km	MPC · JPL
892096	2015 EB_{34}	—	March 29, 2011	Mount Lemmon	Mount Lemmon Survey	·	720 m	MPC · JPL
892097	2015 ES_{34}	—	March 14, 2015	Haleakala	Pan-STARRS 1	EOS	1.3 km	MPC · JPL
892098	2015 EZ_{38}	—	February 10, 2015	Mount Lemmon	Mount Lemmon Survey	·	2.0 km	MPC · JPL
892099	2015 ED_{39}	—	February 16, 2015	Haleakala	Pan-STARRS 1	·	810 m	MPC · JPL
892100	2015 EZ_{40}	—	January 16, 2015	Haleakala	Pan-STARRS 1	·	1.8 km	MPC · JPL

== 892101–892200 ==
back to top

Designation			Discovery			Properties		Ref
Permanent	Provisional	Named after	Date	Site	Discoverer(s)	Category	Diam.	Ref
892101	2015 EO_{43}	—	January 4, 2011	Mount Lemmon	Mount Lemmon Survey	·	870 m	MPC · JPL
892102	2015 EN_{46}	—	February 11, 2015	Kitt Peak	Spacewatch	NYS	780 m	MPC · JPL
892103	2015 EF_{48}	—	February 16, 2015	Haleakala	Pan-STARRS 1	·	1.8 km	MPC · JPL
892104	2015 EY_{48}	—	March 14, 2015	Haleakala	Pan-STARRS 1	AGN	770 m	MPC · JPL
892105	2015 EM_{53}	—	March 14, 2015	Haleakala	Pan-STARRS 1	·	970 m	MPC · JPL
892106	2015 EV_{55}	—	February 24, 2015	Haleakala	Pan-STARRS 1	·	790 m	MPC · JPL
892107	2015 EQ_{64}	—	December 29, 2014	Haleakala	Pan-STARRS 1	·	2.0 km	MPC · JPL
892108	2015 EO_{65}	—	January 27, 2015	Haleakala	Pan-STARRS 1	H	340 m	MPC · JPL
892109	2015 EV_{67}	—	December 22, 2008	Kitt Peak	Spacewatch	·	2.3 km	MPC · JPL
892110	2015 EN_{68}	—	April 3, 2008	Mount Lemmon	Mount Lemmon Survey	MAS	430 m	MPC · JPL
892111	2015 EC_{70}	—	January 21, 2015	Haleakala	Pan-STARRS 1	T_{j} (2.98)	2.0 km	MPC · JPL
892112	2015 EO_{71}	—	January 14, 2011	Mount Lemmon	Mount Lemmon Survey	·	700 m	MPC · JPL
892113	2015 EP_{76}	—	March 15, 2015	Haleakala	Pan-STARRS 1	URS	2.2 km	MPC · JPL
892114	2015 ER_{76}	—	March 15, 2015	Haleakala	Pan-STARRS 1	·	2.3 km	MPC · JPL
892115	2015 EU_{76}	—	March 15, 2015	Haleakala	Pan-STARRS 1	AEG	2.0 km	MPC · JPL
892116	2015 EV_{76}	—	January 21, 2015	Haleakala	Pan-STARRS 1	URS	2.2 km	MPC · JPL
892117	2015 EA_{77}	—	March 15, 2015	Haleakala	Pan-STARRS 1	·	2.3 km	MPC · JPL
892118	2015 EK_{77}	—	March 10, 2015	Mount Lemmon	Mount Lemmon Survey	·	1.7 km	MPC · JPL
892119	2015 EV_{77}	—	March 15, 2015	Haleakala	Pan-STARRS 1	·	1.3 km	MPC · JPL
892120	2015 EZ_{77}	—	March 10, 2015	Mount Lemmon	Mount Lemmon Survey	EUP	1.9 km	MPC · JPL
892121	2015 EF_{78}	—	March 9, 2015	Mount Lemmon	Mount Lemmon Survey	·	1.9 km	MPC · JPL
892122	2015 EL_{78}	—	March 13, 2015	Mount Lemmon	Mount Lemmon Survey	T_{j} (2.98)	1.7 km	MPC · JPL
892123	2015 EP_{79}	—	January 21, 2015	Haleakala	Pan-STARRS 1	·	950 m	MPC · JPL
892124	2015 EA_{84}	—	March 10, 2015	Mount Lemmon	Mount Lemmon Survey	·	1.9 km	MPC · JPL
892125	2015 FH_{5}	—	January 17, 2015	Mount Lemmon	Mount Lemmon Survey	H	370 m	MPC · JPL
892126	2015 FS_{6}	—	February 17, 2007	Mount Lemmon	Mount Lemmon Survey	·	700 m	MPC · JPL
892127	2015 FC_{8}	—	February 13, 2015	Haleakala	Pan-STARRS 1	·	2.1 km	MPC · JPL
892128	2015 FR_{9}	—	March 16, 2015	Haleakala	Pan-STARRS 1	URS	1.9 km	MPC · JPL
892129	2015 FD_{12}	—	March 17, 2015	Haleakala	Pan-STARRS 1	·	1.7 km	MPC · JPL
892130	2015 FT_{14}	—	February 18, 2015	Haleakala	Pan-STARRS 1	EUN	880 m	MPC · JPL
892131	2015 FG_{16}	—	February 18, 2015	Haleakala	Pan-STARRS 1	(18466)	1.2 km	MPC · JPL
892132	2015 FG_{17}	—	February 18, 2015	Haleakala	Pan-STARRS 1	·	2.1 km	MPC · JPL
892133	2015 FH_{26}	—	March 16, 2015	Haleakala	Pan-STARRS 1	·	2.3 km	MPC · JPL
892134	2015 FE_{29}	—	November 10, 2013	Mount Lemmon	Mount Lemmon Survey	URS	2.1 km	MPC · JPL
892135	2015 FJ_{29}	—	March 16, 2015	Haleakala	Pan-STARRS 1	·	2.3 km	MPC · JPL
892136	2015 FH_{30}	—	March 16, 2015	Haleakala	Pan-STARRS 1	·	2.1 km	MPC · JPL
892137	2015 FG_{32}	—	January 15, 2015	Haleakala	Pan-STARRS 1	·	2.0 km	MPC · JPL
892138	2015 FK_{32}	—	March 16, 2015	Haleakala	Pan-STARRS 1	·	2.2 km	MPC · JPL
892139	2015 FR_{38}	—	March 17, 2015	Haleakala	Pan-STARRS 1	·	710 m	MPC · JPL
892140	2015 FU_{40}	—	March 17, 2015	Haleakala	Pan-STARRS 1	·	830 m	MPC · JPL
892141	2015 FS_{44}	—	March 17, 2015	Haleakala	Pan-STARRS 1	·	2.2 km	MPC · JPL
892142	2015 FU_{44}	—	February 3, 2009	Kitt Peak	Spacewatch	·	1.6 km	MPC · JPL
892143	2015 FJ_{49}	—	January 22, 2015	Haleakala	Pan-STARRS 1	·	1.5 km	MPC · JPL
892144	2015 FF_{51}	—	January 16, 2015	Haleakala	Pan-STARRS 1	·	2.0 km	MPC · JPL
892145	2015 FQ_{52}	—	July 1, 2013	Haleakala	Pan-STARRS 1	H	350 m	MPC · JPL
892146	2015 FV_{54}	—	December 2, 2008	Kitt Peak	Spacewatch	THB	1.6 km	MPC · JPL
892147	2015 FT_{55}	—	March 18, 2015	Haleakala	Pan-STARRS 1	·	1.6 km	MPC · JPL
892148	2015 FT_{57}	—	November 9, 2013	Mount Lemmon	Mount Lemmon Survey	·	2.0 km	MPC · JPL
892149	2015 FD_{59}	—	January 18, 2015	Haleakala	Pan-STARRS 1	·	790 m	MPC · JPL
892150	2015 FR_{61}	—	February 20, 2015	Haleakala	Pan-STARRS 1	·	1.6 km	MPC · JPL
892151	2015 FT_{61}	—	January 2, 2009	Kitt Peak	Spacewatch	·	2.0 km	MPC · JPL
892152	2015 FA_{62}	—	December 20, 2014	Haleakala	Pan-STARRS 1	·	2.0 km	MPC · JPL
892153	2015 FR_{66}	—	January 20, 2015	Haleakala	Pan-STARRS 1	·	1.2 km	MPC · JPL
892154	2015 FB_{80}	—	February 20, 2015	Haleakala	Pan-STARRS 1	·	1.9 km	MPC · JPL
892155	2015 FB_{81}	—	March 20, 2015	Haleakala	Pan-STARRS 1	·	2.0 km	MPC · JPL
892156	2015 FY_{83}	—	November 28, 2013	Mount Lemmon	Mount Lemmon Survey	·	2.4 km	MPC · JPL
892157	2015 FH_{86}	—	January 18, 2009	Kitt Peak	Spacewatch	THB	2.0 km	MPC · JPL
892158	2015 FP_{92}	—	March 20, 2015	Haleakala	Pan-STARRS 1	·	1.3 km	MPC · JPL
892159	2015 FD_{93}	—	January 12, 2011	Mount Lemmon	Mount Lemmon Survey	·	890 m	MPC · JPL
892160	2015 FE_{94}	—	March 20, 2015	Haleakala	Pan-STARRS 1	·	870 m	MPC · JPL
892161	2015 FT_{94}	—	November 3, 2007	Mount Lemmon	Mount Lemmon Survey	·	2.0 km	MPC · JPL
892162	2015 FN_{96}	—	March 25, 2011	Haleakala	Pan-STARRS 1	·	860 m	MPC · JPL
892163	2015 FT_{97}	—	January 20, 2015	Haleakala	Pan-STARRS 1	·	1.9 km	MPC · JPL
892164	2015 FH_{100}	—	February 1, 2009	Kitt Peak	Spacewatch	·	2.2 km	MPC · JPL
892165	2015 FY_{103}	—	January 22, 2015	Haleakala	Pan-STARRS 1	·	2.0 km	MPC · JPL
892166	2015 FB_{106}	—	January 20, 2015	Haleakala	Pan-STARRS 1	·	780 m	MPC · JPL
892167	2015 FL_{106}	—	February 5, 2011	Kitt Peak	Spacewatch	·	680 m	MPC · JPL
892168	2015 FM_{109}	—	January 26, 2015	Haleakala	Pan-STARRS 1	·	2.2 km	MPC · JPL
892169	2015 FA_{110}	—	February 20, 2009	Catalina	CSS	TIR	1.8 km	MPC · JPL
892170	2015 FD_{114}	—	March 20, 2015	Haleakala	Pan-STARRS 1	·	860 m	MPC · JPL
892171	2015 FJ_{114}	—	March 20, 2015	Haleakala	Pan-STARRS 1	L4	5.2 km	MPC · JPL
892172	2015 FK_{114}	—	March 20, 2015	Haleakala	Pan-STARRS 1	·	2.3 km	MPC · JPL
892173	2015 FK_{115}	—	February 23, 2015	Haleakala	Pan-STARRS 1	NYS	950 m	MPC · JPL
892174	2015 FP_{115}	—	February 23, 2015	Haleakala	Pan-STARRS 1	·	2.6 km	MPC · JPL
892175	2015 FB_{122}	—	January 19, 2015	Haleakala	Pan-STARRS 1	·	2.5 km	MPC · JPL
892176	2015 FF_{123}	—	December 29, 2014	Haleakala	Pan-STARRS 1	·	1.9 km	MPC · JPL
892177	2015 FV_{125}	—	January 23, 2015	Haleakala	Pan-STARRS 1	·	1.5 km	MPC · JPL
892178	2015 FU_{130}	—	January 27, 2015	Haleakala	Pan-STARRS 1	·	730 m	MPC · JPL
892179	2015 FF_{132}	—	March 20, 2015	Haleakala	Pan-STARRS 1	·	2.3 km	MPC · JPL
892180	2015 FD_{136}	—	November 20, 2006	Kitt Peak	Spacewatch	·	790 m	MPC · JPL
892181	2015 FL_{139}	—	March 21, 2015	Haleakala	Pan-STARRS 1	·	2.0 km	MPC · JPL
892182	2015 FQ_{141}	—	March 21, 2015	Haleakala	Pan-STARRS 1	·	690 m	MPC · JPL
892183	2015 FH_{145}	—	March 21, 2015	Haleakala	Pan-STARRS 1	·	2.0 km	MPC · JPL
892184	2015 FY_{145}	—	March 16, 2015	Kitt Peak	Spacewatch	PHO	600 m	MPC · JPL
892185	2015 FF_{146}	—	September 3, 2013	Calar Alto	F. Hormuth	·	720 m	MPC · JPL
892186	2015 FZ_{147}	—	March 21, 2015	Haleakala	Pan-STARRS 1	·	1.7 km	MPC · JPL
892187	2015 FA_{152}	—	March 17, 2015	Mount Lemmon	Mount Lemmon Survey	·	1.8 km	MPC · JPL
892188	2015 FK_{153}	—	March 21, 2015	Haleakala	Pan-STARRS 1	·	760 m	MPC · JPL
892189	2015 FC_{154}	—	March 21, 2015	Haleakala	Pan-STARRS 1	MAS	500 m	MPC · JPL
892190	2015 FH_{155}	—	February 11, 2011	Mount Lemmon	Mount Lemmon Survey	·	880 m	MPC · JPL
892191	2015 FD_{156}	—	October 10, 2007	Mount Lemmon	Mount Lemmon Survey	·	1.8 km	MPC · JPL
892192	2015 FA_{161}	—	March 1, 2009	Kitt Peak	Spacewatch	·	2.4 km	MPC · JPL
892193	2015 FY_{161}	—	March 21, 2015	Haleakala	Pan-STARRS 1	·	2.0 km	MPC · JPL
892194	2015 FZ_{165}	—	March 21, 2015	Haleakala	Pan-STARRS 1	MAS	550 m	MPC · JPL
892195	2015 FC_{170}	—	August 29, 2013	Haleakala	Pan-STARRS 1	H	370 m	MPC · JPL
892196	2015 FN_{170}	—	February 8, 2011	Mount Lemmon	Mount Lemmon Survey	NYS	720 m	MPC · JPL
892197	2015 FN_{177}	—	September 21, 2011	Mount Lemmon	Mount Lemmon Survey	·	2.6 km	MPC · JPL
892198	2015 FX_{177}	—	March 22, 2015	Kitt Peak	Spacewatch	TIR	2.1 km	MPC · JPL
892199	2015 FZ_{177}	—	March 22, 2015	Kitt Peak	Spacewatch	·	790 m	MPC · JPL
892200	2015 FS_{185}	—	January 22, 2015	Haleakala	Pan-STARRS 1	·	1.9 km	MPC · JPL

== 892201–892300 ==
back to top

Designation			Discovery			Properties		Ref
Permanent	Provisional	Named after	Date	Site	Discoverer(s)	Category	Diam.	Ref
892201	2015 FD_{187}	—	November 25, 2013	Haleakala	Pan-STARRS 1	·	1.1 km	MPC · JPL
892202	2015 FQ_{195}	—	January 23, 2011	Mount Lemmon	Mount Lemmon Survey	·	830 m	MPC · JPL
892203	2015 FK_{196}	—	November 4, 2013	Mount Lemmon	Mount Lemmon Survey	·	1.8 km	MPC · JPL
892204	2015 FY_{197}	—	January 23, 2015	Haleakala	Pan-STARRS 1	V	460 m	MPC · JPL
892205	2015 FA_{199}	—	February 5, 2011	Mount Lemmon	Mount Lemmon Survey	ERI	980 m	MPC · JPL
892206	2015 FF_{213}	—	February 16, 2015	Haleakala	Pan-STARRS 1	·	1.9 km	MPC · JPL
892207	2015 FP_{213}	—	January 31, 2009	Mount Lemmon	Mount Lemmon Survey	·	1.7 km	MPC · JPL
892208	2015 FZ_{213}	—	March 22, 2015	Haleakala	Pan-STARRS 1	·	2.0 km	MPC · JPL
892209	2015 FL_{219}	—	March 23, 2015	Haleakala	Pan-STARRS 1	NYS	680 m	MPC · JPL
892210	2015 FH_{224}	—	January 24, 2011	Mount Lemmon	Mount Lemmon Survey	·	820 m	MPC · JPL
892211	2015 FD_{228}	—	January 25, 2015	Haleakala	Pan-STARRS 1	MAS	570 m	MPC · JPL
892212	2015 FQ_{228}	—	March 23, 2015	Haleakala	Pan-STARRS 1	·	1.6 km	MPC · JPL
892213	2015 FE_{243}	—	January 20, 2009	Kitt Peak	Spacewatch	·	1.8 km	MPC · JPL
892214	2015 FF_{245}	—	January 14, 2011	Mount Lemmon	Mount Lemmon Survey	·	780 m	MPC · JPL
892215	2015 FX_{245}	—	March 16, 2015	Flagstaff	Wasserman, L. H.	·	1.0 km	MPC · JPL
892216	2015 FD_{252}	—	March 14, 2004	Kitt Peak	Spacewatch	TIR	2.1 km	MPC · JPL
892217	2015 FR_{252}	—	January 29, 2009	Kitt Peak	Spacewatch	THM	1.4 km	MPC · JPL
892218	2015 FY_{254}	—	January 23, 2011	Mount Lemmon	Mount Lemmon Survey	·	680 m	MPC · JPL
892219	2015 FA_{259}	—	November 8, 2013	Mount Lemmon	Mount Lemmon Survey	·	1.0 km	MPC · JPL
892220	2015 FZ_{259}	—	January 23, 2015	Haleakala	Pan-STARRS 1	·	1.6 km	MPC · JPL
892221	2015 FG_{260}	—	March 24, 2015	Haleakala	Pan-STARRS 1	·	1.3 km	MPC · JPL
892222	2015 FU_{260}	—	April 26, 2008	Mount Lemmon	Mount Lemmon Survey	NYS	750 m	MPC · JPL
892223	2015 FD_{262}	—	January 2, 2009	Kitt Peak	Spacewatch	THM	1.7 km	MPC · JPL
892224	2015 FJ_{265}	—	January 28, 2015	Haleakala	Pan-STARRS 1	H	340 m	MPC · JPL
892225	2015 FQ_{265}	—	September 30, 2006	Mount Lemmon	Mount Lemmon Survey	·	2.3 km	MPC · JPL
892226	2015 FQ_{271}	—	February 17, 2015	Haleakala	Pan-STARRS 1	·	1.9 km	MPC · JPL
892227	2015 FG_{272}	—	March 24, 2015	Haleakala	Pan-STARRS 1	·	1.1 km	MPC · JPL
892228	2015 FP_{273}	—	October 15, 2012	Mount Lemmon	Mount Lemmon Survey	·	2.2 km	MPC · JPL
892229	2015 FN_{275}	—	January 28, 2015	Haleakala	Pan-STARRS 1	·	2.2 km	MPC · JPL
892230	2015 FQ_{285}	—	March 16, 2004	Apache Point	SDSS	·	2.3 km	MPC · JPL
892231	2015 FF_{292}	—	March 27, 2015	Mount Lemmon	Mount Lemmon Survey	·	1.8 km	MPC · JPL
892232	2015 FY_{305}	—	August 17, 2012	Haleakala	Pan-STARRS 1	·	800 m	MPC · JPL
892233	2015 FN_{307}	—	March 24, 2015	Haleakala	Pan-STARRS 1	·	830 m	MPC · JPL
892234	2015 FQ_{316}	—	January 23, 2015	Haleakala	Pan-STARRS 1	·	1.9 km	MPC · JPL
892235	2015 FQ_{321}	—	March 25, 2015	Haleakala	Pan-STARRS 1	TIR	2.1 km	MPC · JPL
892236	2015 FN_{322}	—	March 25, 2015	Haleakala	Pan-STARRS 1	·	2.4 km	MPC · JPL
892237	2015 FS_{324}	—	March 25, 2015	Haleakala	Pan-STARRS 1	·	1.0 km	MPC · JPL
892238	2015 FB_{327}	—	March 25, 2015	Haleakala	Pan-STARRS 1	·	1.3 km	MPC · JPL
892239	2015 FC_{330}	—	March 25, 2015	Haleakala	Pan-STARRS 1	·	790 m	MPC · JPL
892240	2015 FO_{330}	—	October 13, 2013	Mount Lemmon	Mount Lemmon Survey	·	810 m	MPC · JPL
892241	2015 FU_{336}	—	April 2, 2009	Kitt Peak	Spacewatch	·	2.2 km	MPC · JPL
892242	2015 FB_{347}	—	January 15, 2007	Mauna Kea	P. A. Wiegert	·	700 m	MPC · JPL
892243	2015 FV_{348}	—	December 22, 2012	Haleakala	Pan-STARRS 1	L4 · HEK	5.9 km	MPC · JPL
892244	2015 FL_{349}	—	March 16, 2015	Haleakala	Pan-STARRS 1	H	480 m	MPC · JPL
892245	2015 FB_{351}	—	March 10, 2015	Mount Lemmon	Mount Lemmon Survey	·	2.1 km	MPC · JPL
892246	2015 FA_{352}	—	March 16, 2015	Haleakala	Pan-STARRS 1	EUP	2.2 km	MPC · JPL
892247	2015 FN_{352}	—	February 18, 2015	Kitt Peak	Research and Education Collaborative Occultation Network	EOS	1.3 km	MPC · JPL
892248	2015 FC_{363}	—	March 18, 2015	Haleakala	Pan-STARRS 1	·	2.0 km	MPC · JPL
892249	2015 FW_{366}	—	January 26, 2015	Haleakala	Pan-STARRS 1	·	2.2 km	MPC · JPL
892250	2015 FY_{366}	—	November 27, 2013	Haleakala	Pan-STARRS 1	·	2.1 km	MPC · JPL
892251	2015 FC_{369}	—	December 30, 2008	Mount Lemmon	Mount Lemmon Survey	·	1.9 km	MPC · JPL
892252	2015 FA_{374}	—	March 18, 2015	Haleakala	Pan-STARRS 1	·	2.0 km	MPC · JPL
892253	2015 FU_{384}	—	February 24, 2015	Haleakala	Pan-STARRS 1	·	1.8 km	MPC · JPL
892254	2015 FO_{387}	—	January 28, 2015	Haleakala	Pan-STARRS 1	H	410 m	MPC · JPL
892255	2015 FS_{390}	—	January 22, 2015	Haleakala	Pan-STARRS 1	·	860 m	MPC · JPL
892256	2015 FB_{395}	—	March 21, 2015	Haleakala	Pan-STARRS 1	·	800 m	MPC · JPL
892257	2015 FT_{395}	—	March 28, 2015	Haleakala	Pan-STARRS 1	·	2.1 km	MPC · JPL
892258	2015 FE_{404}	—	March 2, 2011	Mount Lemmon	Mount Lemmon Survey	V	420 m	MPC · JPL
892259	2015 FG_{404}	—	February 2, 2009	Mount Lemmon	Mount Lemmon Survey	·	2.5 km	MPC · JPL
892260	2015 FN_{404}	—	March 16, 2009	Kitt Peak	Spacewatch	·	2.0 km	MPC · JPL
892261	2015 FB_{406}	—	January 21, 2015	Haleakala	Pan-STARRS 1	V	500 m	MPC · JPL
892262	2015 FT_{408}	—	April 2, 2009	Mount Lemmon	Mount Lemmon Survey	THB	2.4 km	MPC · JPL
892263	2015 FD_{409}	—	January 25, 2009	Kitt Peak	Spacewatch	·	1.4 km	MPC · JPL
892264	2015 FO_{409}	—	March 22, 2015	Haleakala	Pan-STARRS 1	·	2.4 km	MPC · JPL
892265	2015 FU_{409}	—	November 28, 2013	Mount Lemmon	Mount Lemmon Survey	·	2.0 km	MPC · JPL
892266	2015 FX_{409}	—	March 22, 2015	Haleakala	Pan-STARRS 1	MAR	740 m	MPC · JPL
892267	2015 FK_{414}	—	March 31, 2015	Haleakala	Pan-STARRS 1	·	2.1 km	MPC · JPL
892268	2015 FR_{418}	—	March 24, 2015	Haleakala	Pan-STARRS 1	·	2.8 km	MPC · JPL
892269	2015 FE_{423}	—	March 21, 2015	Haleakala	Pan-STARRS 1	·	2.2 km	MPC · JPL
892270	2015 FV_{423}	—	March 23, 2015	Kitt Peak	Spacewatch	NYS	680 m	MPC · JPL
892271	2015 FB_{424}	—	March 25, 2015	Haleakala	Pan-STARRS 1	·	2.0 km	MPC · JPL
892272	2015 FH_{424}	—	March 29, 2015	Haleakala	Pan-STARRS 1	·	410 m	MPC · JPL
892273	2015 FS_{425}	—	March 24, 2015	Haleakala	Pan-STARRS 1	·	2.3 km	MPC · JPL
892274	2015 FC_{426}	—	March 21, 2015	Haleakala	Pan-STARRS 1	·	2.1 km	MPC · JPL
892275	2015 FS_{426}	—	March 26, 2015	Mount Lemmon	Mount Lemmon Survey	LIX	2.4 km	MPC · JPL
892276	2015 FY_{427}	—	March 21, 2015	Mount Lemmon	Mount Lemmon Survey	·	1.8 km	MPC · JPL
892277	2015 FM_{428}	—	March 22, 2015	Haleakala	Pan-STARRS 1	·	2.0 km	MPC · JPL
892278	2015 FC_{429}	—	March 29, 2015	Haleakala	Pan-STARRS 1	·	2.0 km	MPC · JPL
892279	2015 FR_{429}	—	March 25, 2015	Haleakala	Pan-STARRS 1	·	2.5 km	MPC · JPL
892280	2015 FL_{430}	—	March 21, 2015	Haleakala	Pan-STARRS 1	·	2.2 km	MPC · JPL
892281	2015 FM_{430}	—	March 30, 2015	Haleakala	Pan-STARRS 1	·	1.3 km	MPC · JPL
892282	2015 FX_{430}	—	March 24, 2015	Mount Lemmon	Mount Lemmon Survey	·	1.1 km	MPC · JPL
892283	2015 FY_{430}	—	March 27, 2015	Kitt Peak	Spacewatch	·	1.8 km	MPC · JPL
892284	2015 FP_{435}	—	March 22, 2015	Haleakala	Pan-STARRS 1	·	1.5 km	MPC · JPL
892285	2015 FW_{436}	—	March 28, 2015	Haleakala	Pan-STARRS 1	·	1.4 km	MPC · JPL
892286	2015 FB_{438}	—	March 24, 2015	Mount Lemmon	Mount Lemmon Survey	·	2.2 km	MPC · JPL
892287	2015 FH_{438}	—	March 22, 2015	Haleakala	Pan-STARRS 1	·	2.0 km	MPC · JPL
892288	2015 FS_{440}	—	March 25, 2015	Haleakala	Pan-STARRS 1	·	2.2 km	MPC · JPL
892289	2015 FW_{440}	—	March 16, 2015	Mount Lemmon	Mount Lemmon Survey	·	2.0 km	MPC · JPL
892290	2015 FX_{441}	—	March 17, 2015	Haleakala	Pan-STARRS 1	·	2.3 km	MPC · JPL
892291	2015 FB_{444}	—	January 22, 2015	Haleakala	Pan-STARRS 1	·	2.2 km	MPC · JPL
892292	2015 FQ_{444}	—	February 8, 2011	Mount Lemmon	Mount Lemmon Survey	·	710 m	MPC · JPL
892293	2015 FC_{446}	—	March 17, 2015	Haleakala	Pan-STARRS 1	·	1.8 km	MPC · JPL
892294	2015 FD_{449}	—	January 4, 2006	Mount Lemmon	Mount Lemmon Survey	·	1.2 km	MPC · JPL
892295	2015 FJ_{453}	—	March 21, 2015	Haleakala	Pan-STARRS 1	·	1.1 km	MPC · JPL
892296	2015 FY_{453}	—	March 21, 2015	Haleakala	Pan-STARRS 1	·	1.6 km	MPC · JPL
892297	2015 FJ_{454}	—	March 28, 2015	Haleakala	Pan-STARRS 1	·	880 m	MPC · JPL
892298	2015 FH_{456}	—	January 22, 2015	Haleakala	Pan-STARRS 1	·	2.3 km	MPC · JPL
892299	2015 FB_{458}	—	March 18, 2015	Haleakala	Pan-STARRS 1	MAS	520 m	MPC · JPL
892300	2015 FP_{460}	—	March 3, 2009	Mount Lemmon	Mount Lemmon Survey	THM	1.6 km	MPC · JPL

== 892301–892400 ==
back to top

Designation			Discovery			Properties		Ref
Permanent	Provisional	Named after	Date	Site	Discoverer(s)	Category	Diam.	Ref
892301	2015 FO_{466}	—	March 17, 2015	Mount Lemmon	Mount Lemmon Survey	·	400 m	MPC · JPL
892302	2015 FD_{480}	—	March 16, 2015	Haleakala	Pan-STARRS 1	·	2.1 km	MPC · JPL
892303	2015 GF	—	April 4, 2015	Haleakala	Pan-STARRS 1	AMO	280 m	MPC · JPL
892304	2015 GY	—	April 10, 2015	Haleakala	Pan-STARRS 1	APO · PHA	140 m	MPC · JPL
892305	2015 GF_{2}	—	October 31, 2013	Mount Lemmon	Mount Lemmon Survey	·	1.5 km	MPC · JPL
892306	2015 GC_{6}	—	April 12, 2015	Haleakala	Pan-STARRS 1	·	860 m	MPC · JPL
892307	2015 GF_{6}	—	February 18, 2015	Haleakala	Pan-STARRS 1	·	2.0 km	MPC · JPL
892308	2015 GD_{10}	—	December 21, 2008	Mount Lemmon	Mount Lemmon Survey	·	2.1 km	MPC · JPL
892309	2015 GP_{10}	—	December 21, 2008	Kitt Peak	Spacewatch	·	1.6 km	MPC · JPL
892310	2015 GD_{11}	—	February 18, 2015	Haleakala	Pan-STARRS 1	·	2.3 km	MPC · JPL
892311	2015 GN_{18}	—	February 24, 2015	Haleakala	Pan-STARRS 1	·	1.7 km	MPC · JPL
892312	2015 GO_{26}	—	April 12, 2015	Haleakala	Pan-STARRS 1	THB	1.8 km	MPC · JPL
892313	2015 GV_{26}	—	March 15, 2015	Haleakala	Pan-STARRS 1	T_{j} (2.94)	2.5 km	MPC · JPL
892314	2015 GA_{27}	—	February 16, 2015	Haleakala	Pan-STARRS 1	PHO	630 m	MPC · JPL
892315	2015 GX_{29}	—	March 24, 2015	Mount Lemmon	Mount Lemmon Survey	LIX	2.2 km	MPC · JPL
892316	2015 GQ_{30}	—	March 29, 2015	Haleakala	Pan-STARRS 1	·	1.1 km	MPC · JPL
892317	2015 GR_{33}	—	March 21, 2015	Haleakala	Pan-STARRS 1	EUP	2.2 km	MPC · JPL
892318	2015 GU_{37}	—	March 21, 2015	Haleakala	Pan-STARRS 1	·	1.8 km	MPC · JPL
892319	2015 GX_{41}	—	March 22, 2015	Haleakala	Pan-STARRS 1	LIX	2.2 km	MPC · JPL
892320	2015 GM_{42}	—	March 22, 2015	Haleakala	Pan-STARRS 1	·	2.2 km	MPC · JPL
892321	2015 GN_{43}	—	March 24, 2015	Haleakala	Pan-STARRS 1	TIR	2.4 km	MPC · JPL
892322	2015 GP_{46}	—	April 15, 2015	Haleakala	Pan-STARRS 1	·	1.9 km	MPC · JPL
892323	2015 GQ_{46}	—	March 21, 2015	Haleakala	Pan-STARRS 1	HYG	1.8 km	MPC · JPL
892324	2015 GM_{59}	—	April 13, 2015	Haleakala	Pan-STARRS 1	PHO	670 m	MPC · JPL
892325	2015 GK_{60}	—	April 4, 2015	Haleakala	Pan-STARRS 1	·	2.3 km	MPC · JPL
892326	2015 GW_{66}	—	April 1, 2015	Haleakala	Pan-STARRS 1	·	1.9 km	MPC · JPL
892327	2015 GL_{67}	—	April 15, 2015	Mount Lemmon	Mount Lemmon Survey	·	510 m	MPC · JPL
892328	2015 GW_{68}	—	April 1, 2015	Mount Lemmon	Mount Lemmon Survey	H	430 m	MPC · JPL
892329	2015 GX_{72}	—	March 22, 2009	Mount Lemmon	Mount Lemmon Survey	·	2.0 km	MPC · JPL
892330	2015 HO_{2}	—	January 24, 2015	Haleakala	Pan-STARRS 1	·	2.2 km	MPC · JPL
892331	2015 HY_{12}	—	December 20, 2014	Haleakala	Pan-STARRS 1	·	880 m	MPC · JPL
892332	2015 HR_{14}	—	February 18, 2015	Haleakala	Pan-STARRS 1	H	380 m	MPC · JPL
892333	2015 HM_{15}	—	April 19, 2015	Mount Lemmon	Mount Lemmon Survey	TIR	1.8 km	MPC · JPL
892334	2015 HW_{19}	—	January 10, 2011	Kitt Peak	Spacewatch	NYS	760 m	MPC · JPL
892335	2015 HG_{22}	—	March 14, 2011	Mount Lemmon	Mount Lemmon Survey	·	850 m	MPC · JPL
892336	2015 HC_{23}	—	March 13, 2012	Mount Lemmon	Mount Lemmon Survey	·	1.1 km	MPC · JPL
892337	2015 HG_{23}	—	February 8, 2011	Mount Lemmon	Mount Lemmon Survey	NYS	900 m	MPC · JPL
892338	2015 HE_{24}	—	February 22, 2009	Kitt Peak	Spacewatch	·	1.9 km	MPC · JPL
892339	2015 HT_{25}	—	February 23, 2015	Haleakala	Pan-STARRS 1	·	2.5 km	MPC · JPL
892340	2015 HN_{26}	—	March 17, 2015	Haleakala	Pan-STARRS 1	MAS	490 m	MPC · JPL
892341	2015 HR_{28}	—	February 24, 2015	Haleakala	Pan-STARRS 1	·	870 m	MPC · JPL
892342	2015 HE_{29}	—	January 31, 2015	Haleakala	Pan-STARRS 1	H	470 m	MPC · JPL
892343	2015 HE_{35}	—	January 28, 2015	Haleakala	Pan-STARRS 1	·	2.3 km	MPC · JPL
892344	2015 HD_{36}	—	January 28, 2015	Haleakala	Pan-STARRS 1	·	1.1 km	MPC · JPL
892345	2015 HC_{49}	—	April 16, 2015	Haleakala	Pan-STARRS 1	TIR	1.8 km	MPC · JPL
892346	2015 HE_{51}	—	February 23, 2015	Haleakala	Pan-STARRS 1	·	2.4 km	MPC · JPL
892347	2015 HH_{64}	—	December 27, 2006	Mount Lemmon	Mount Lemmon Survey	MAS	510 m	MPC · JPL
892348	2015 HV_{64}	—	April 17, 2015	Mount Lemmon	Mount Lemmon Survey	·	860 m	MPC · JPL
892349	2015 HS_{67}	—	April 23, 2015	Haleakala	Pan-STARRS 1	·	1.2 km	MPC · JPL
892350	2015 HL_{68}	—	February 25, 2011	Kitt Peak	Spacewatch	·	850 m	MPC · JPL
892351	2015 HO_{74}	—	February 25, 2011	Mount Lemmon	Mount Lemmon Survey	·	750 m	MPC · JPL
892352	2015 HQ_{85}	—	February 23, 2015	Haleakala	Pan-STARRS 1	·	2.0 km	MPC · JPL
892353	2015 HK_{88}	—	March 17, 2015	Haleakala	Pan-STARRS 1	·	2.3 km	MPC · JPL
892354	2015 HQ_{90}	—	November 1, 2013	Mount Lemmon	Mount Lemmon Survey	MAS	520 m	MPC · JPL
892355	2015 HS_{90}	—	April 23, 2015	Haleakala	Pan-STARRS 1	·	1.9 km	MPC · JPL
892356	2015 HW_{94}	—	March 17, 2015	Haleakala	Pan-STARRS 1	·	1.9 km	MPC · JPL
892357	2015 HM_{95}	—	April 18, 2015	Kitt Peak	Spacewatch	·	840 m	MPC · JPL
892358	2015 HR_{106}	—	March 22, 2015	Haleakala	Pan-STARRS 1	·	2.0 km	MPC · JPL
892359	2015 HA_{107}	—	February 16, 2015	Haleakala	Pan-STARRS 1	·	2.6 km	MPC · JPL
892360	2015 HH_{108}	—	February 16, 2015	Haleakala	Pan-STARRS 1	·	2.0 km	MPC · JPL
892361	2015 HY_{108}	—	April 23, 2015	Haleakala	Pan-STARRS 1	·	1.1 km	MPC · JPL
892362	2015 HB_{110}	—	February 23, 2015	Haleakala	Pan-STARRS 1	·	1.6 km	MPC · JPL
892363	2015 HF_{117}	—	April 24, 2015	Haleakala	Pan-STARRS 1	·	910 m	MPC · JPL
892364	2015 HN_{124}	—	April 23, 2015	Haleakala	Pan-STARRS 1	·	1.1 km	MPC · JPL
892365	2015 HY_{126}	—	April 23, 2015	Haleakala	Pan-STARRS 1	MAS	460 m	MPC · JPL
892366	2015 HN_{128}	—	April 23, 2015	Haleakala	Pan-STARRS 1	·	1.2 km	MPC · JPL
892367	2015 HV_{135}	—	April 23, 2015	Haleakala	Pan-STARRS 1	·	2.4 km	MPC · JPL
892368	2015 HN_{140}	—	April 23, 2015	Haleakala	Pan-STARRS 1	·	1.1 km	MPC · JPL
892369	2015 HK_{174}	—	March 21, 2015	Catalina	CSS	·	1.8 km	MPC · JPL
892370	2015 HR_{188}	—	April 18, 2015	Haleakala	Pan-STARRS 1	·	2.2 km	MPC · JPL
892371	2015 HH_{205}	—	April 18, 2015	Haleakala	Pan-STARRS 1	·	2.0 km	MPC · JPL
892372	2015 HM_{205}	—	April 18, 2015	Haleakala	Pan-STARRS 1	·	1.5 km	MPC · JPL
892373	2015 HP_{209}	—	April 23, 2015	Haleakala	Pan-STARRS 1	·	2.0 km	MPC · JPL
892374	2015 HQ_{209}	—	April 23, 2015	Haleakala	Pan-STARRS 1	·	1.2 km	MPC · JPL
892375	2015 HY_{210}	—	April 25, 2015	Haleakala	Pan-STARRS 1	·	1.7 km	MPC · JPL
892376	2015 HK_{213}	—	April 23, 2015	Haleakala	Pan-STARRS 1	AGN	870 m	MPC · JPL
892377	2015 HJ_{217}	—	April 18, 2015	Haleakala	Pan-STARRS 1	·	2.4 km	MPC · JPL
892378	2015 HG_{218}	—	April 25, 2015	Haleakala	Pan-STARRS 1	·	930 m	MPC · JPL
892379	2015 HW_{218}	—	April 25, 2015	Haleakala	Pan-STARRS 1	·	900 m	MPC · JPL
892380	2015 HE_{222}	—	January 28, 2015	Haleakala	Pan-STARRS 1	·	1.8 km	MPC · JPL
892381	2015 HN_{226}	—	November 8, 2013	Kitt Peak	Spacewatch	·	810 m	MPC · JPL
892382	2015 HM_{246}	—	April 18, 2015	Cerro Tololo-DECam	DECam	·	1.0 km	MPC · JPL
892383	2015 HE_{283}	—	April 19, 2015	Cerro Tololo-DECam	DECam	L4	5.3 km	MPC · JPL
892384	2015 HW_{286}	—	April 18, 2015	Mount Lemmon	Mount Lemmon Survey	·	2.2 km	MPC · JPL
892385	2015 HA_{308}	—	April 18, 2015	Cerro Tololo-DECam	DECam	·	1.0 km	MPC · JPL
892386	2015 HS_{335}	—	April 18, 2015	Cerro Tololo-DECam	DECam	L4	5.3 km	MPC · JPL
892387	2015 HB_{350}	—	April 20, 2015	Cerro Paranal	Gaia Ground Based Optical Tracking	·	2.1 km	MPC · JPL
892388	2015 HW_{472}	—	April 18, 2015	Cerro Tololo-DECam	DECam	·	990 m	MPC · JPL
892389	2015 JW_{7}	—	February 18, 2015	Haleakala	Pan-STARRS 1	TIR	1.9 km	MPC · JPL
892390	2015 JW_{11}	—	May 11, 2015	Haleakala	Pan-STARRS 1	H	470 m	MPC · JPL
892391	2015 JQ_{12}	—	May 15, 2015	Haleakala	Pan-STARRS 1	·	1.1 km	MPC · JPL
892392	2015 JG_{15}	—	May 13, 2015	Haleakala	Pan-STARRS 1	·	1.9 km	MPC · JPL
892393	2015 JY_{25}	—	May 12, 2015	Mount Lemmon	Mount Lemmon Survey	HOF	2.1 km	MPC · JPL
892394	2015 JN_{26}	—	May 14, 2015	Haleakala	Pan-STARRS 1	·	2.4 km	MPC · JPL
892395	2015 KV_{1}	—	April 10, 2015	Haleakala	Pan-STARRS 1	·	860 m	MPC · JPL
892396	2015 KH_{10}	—	May 18, 2015	Haleakala	Pan-STARRS 1	·	2.0 km	MPC · JPL
892397	2015 KA_{13}	—	May 18, 2015	Haleakala	Pan-STARRS 1	·	1.5 km	MPC · JPL
892398	2015 KB_{14}	—	May 18, 2015	Haleakala	Pan-STARRS 1	HNS	740 m	MPC · JPL
892399	2015 KH_{14}	—	April 25, 2015	Haleakala	Pan-STARRS 1	THB	2.3 km	MPC · JPL
892400	2015 KZ_{34}	—	February 25, 2007	Kitt Peak	Spacewatch	MAS	540 m	MPC · JPL

== 892401–892500 ==
back to top

Designation			Discovery			Properties		Ref
Permanent	Provisional	Named after	Date	Site	Discoverer(s)	Category	Diam.	Ref
892401	2015 KM_{43}	—	May 20, 2015	Haleakala	Pan-STARRS 1	NYS	930 m	MPC · JPL
892402	2015 KJ_{51}	—	April 3, 2011	Haleakala	Pan-STARRS 1	·	740 m	MPC · JPL
892403	2015 KG_{66}	—	November 7, 2008	Mount Lemmon	Mount Lemmon Survey	·	1.1 km	MPC · JPL
892404	2015 KZ_{69}	—	May 21, 2015	Haleakala	Pan-STARRS 1	·	2.1 km	MPC · JPL
892405	2015 KT_{79}	—	May 21, 2015	Haleakala	Pan-STARRS 1	·	1.3 km	MPC · JPL
892406	2015 KN_{83}	—	September 5, 2008	Kitt Peak	Spacewatch	MAR	650 m	MPC · JPL
892407	2015 KX_{99}	—	May 21, 2015	Haleakala	Pan-STARRS 1	EUN	690 m	MPC · JPL
892408	2015 KD_{136}	—	May 12, 2015	Mount Lemmon	Mount Lemmon Survey	·	870 m	MPC · JPL
892409	2015 KK_{136}	—	February 8, 2007	Mount Lemmon	Mount Lemmon Survey	·	900 m	MPC · JPL
892410	2015 KP_{136}	—	May 11, 2015	Mount Lemmon	Mount Lemmon Survey	·	390 m	MPC · JPL
892411	2015 KU_{155}	—	May 19, 2015	Mount Lemmon	Mount Lemmon Survey	PHO	490 m	MPC · JPL
892412	2015 KP_{179}	—	May 25, 2015	Haleakala	Pan-STARRS 1	PHO	510 m	MPC · JPL
892413	2015 KV_{179}	—	May 26, 2015	Haleakala	Pan-STARRS 1	H	300 m	MPC · JPL
892414	2015 KJ_{180}	—	May 21, 2015	Haleakala	Pan-STARRS 1	·	860 m	MPC · JPL
892415	2015 KO_{180}	—	May 18, 2015	Haleakala	Pan-STARRS 1	·	1.2 km	MPC · JPL
892416	2015 KY_{180}	—	May 22, 2015	Mount Lemmon	Mount Lemmon Survey	·	1.0 km	MPC · JPL
892417	2015 KT_{186}	—	December 4, 2012	Mount Lemmon	Mount Lemmon Survey	·	1.3 km	MPC · JPL
892418	2015 KV_{198}	—	May 18, 2015	Mount Lemmon	Mount Lemmon Survey	·	1.4 km	MPC · JPL
892419	2015 KB_{208}	—	May 26, 2015	Haleakala	Pan-STARRS 1	·	810 m	MPC · JPL
892420	2015 KY_{225}	—	May 20, 2015	Cerro Tololo-DECam	DECam	MAR	620 m	MPC · JPL
892421	2015 KW_{375}	—	October 10, 2012	Mount Lemmon	Mount Lemmon Survey	·	1.3 km	MPC · JPL
892422	2015 KO_{486}	—	May 20, 2015	Cerro Tololo-DECam	DECam	·	2.3 km	MPC · JPL
892423	2015 LR_{8}	—	April 22, 2009	Mount Lemmon	Mount Lemmon Survey	·	2.9 km	MPC · JPL
892424	2015 LO_{11}	—	June 9, 2015	Haleakala	Pan-STARRS 1	·	1.1 km	MPC · JPL
892425	2015 LQ_{27}	—	June 13, 2015	Haleakala	Pan-STARRS 1	PHO	690 m	MPC · JPL
892426	2015 LV_{46}	—	August 1, 2016	Haleakala	Pan-STARRS 1	HNS	750 m	MPC · JPL
892427	2015 LH_{47}	—	June 11, 2015	Haleakala	Pan-STARRS 1	615	990 m	MPC · JPL
892428	2015 LN_{47}	—	June 13, 2015	Haleakala	Pan-STARRS 1	·	1.4 km	MPC · JPL
892429	2015 LR_{54}	—	June 8, 2015	Haleakala	Pan-STARRS 1	·	2.0 km	MPC · JPL
892430	2015 LV_{55}	—	June 12, 2015	Mount Lemmon	Mount Lemmon Survey	PHO	720 m	MPC · JPL
892431	2015 LN_{56}	—	June 12, 2015	Haleakala	Pan-STARRS 1	·	500 m	MPC · JPL
892432	2015 LQ_{56}	—	June 13, 2015	Haleakala	Pan-STARRS 1	·	1.4 km	MPC · JPL
892433	2015 LC_{58}	—	June 13, 2015	Haleakala	Pan-STARRS 1	·	1.3 km	MPC · JPL
892434	2015 LG_{60}	—	June 15, 2015	Haleakala	Pan-STARRS 1	MAR	710 m	MPC · JPL
892435	2015 MU_{1}	—	May 15, 2015	Haleakala	Pan-STARRS 1	·	2.6 km	MPC · JPL
892436	2015 MV_{7}	—	June 16, 2015	Haleakala	Pan-STARRS 1	·	1.3 km	MPC · JPL
892437	2015 MV_{32}	—	April 14, 2015	Kitt Peak	Spacewatch	·	1.6 km	MPC · JPL
892438	2015 MU_{37}	—	May 18, 2015	Mount Lemmon	Mount Lemmon Survey	PHO	660 m	MPC · JPL
892439	2015 MC_{88}	—	June 18, 2015	Haleakala	Pan-STARRS 1	·	1 km	MPC · JPL
892440	2015 MG_{99}	—	June 23, 2015	Haleakala	Pan-STARRS 1	·	1.2 km	MPC · JPL
892441	2015 MD_{120}	—	June 27, 2015	Haleakala	Pan-STARRS 1	·	1.2 km	MPC · JPL
892442	2015 MJ_{120}	—	June 27, 2015	Haleakala	Pan-STARRS 1	GEF	720 m	MPC · JPL
892443	2015 MT_{129}	—	June 24, 2015	Haleakala	Pan-STARRS 2	·	1.1 km	MPC · JPL
892444	2015 MN_{141}	—	May 20, 2014	Haleakala	Pan-STARRS 1	·	1.5 km	MPC · JPL
892445	2015 MC_{159}	—	June 26, 2015	Haleakala	Pan-STARRS 1	NYS	760 m	MPC · JPL
892446	2015 MG_{159}	—	June 25, 2015	Haleakala	Pan-STARRS 1	·	1.1 km	MPC · JPL
892447	2015 MD_{162}	—	June 19, 2015	Mount Lemmon	Mount Lemmon Survey	·	880 m	MPC · JPL
892448	2015 MS_{173}	—	June 26, 2015	Haleakala	Pan-STARRS 1	·	1.2 km	MPC · JPL
892449	2015 MV_{174}	—	June 27, 2015	Haleakala	Pan-STARRS 1	EUN	850 m	MPC · JPL
892450	2015 MO_{176}	—	June 26, 2015	Haleakala	Pan-STARRS 1	·	890 m	MPC · JPL
892451	2015 MH_{177}	—	June 27, 2015	Haleakala	Pan-STARRS 1	ADE	1.5 km	MPC · JPL
892452	2015 MQ_{177}	—	June 27, 2015	Haleakala	Pan-STARRS 1	EUN	940 m	MPC · JPL
892453	2015 MG_{191}	—	June 26, 2015	Haleakala	Pan-STARRS 1	·	1.3 km	MPC · JPL
892454	2015 ML_{191}	—	June 27, 2015	Haleakala	Pan-STARRS 1	·	1.5 km	MPC · JPL
892455	2015 MS_{193}	—	June 27, 2015	Haleakala	Pan-STARRS 1	·	1.5 km	MPC · JPL
892456	2015 MD_{210}	—	June 19, 2015	Haleakala	Pan-STARRS 1	·	1.0 km	MPC · JPL
892457	2015 NA_{11}	—	March 28, 2015	Haleakala	Pan-STARRS 1	·	2.2 km	MPC · JPL
892458	2015 NY_{30}	—	July 11, 2015	Haleakala	Pan-STARRS 1	·	1.3 km	MPC · JPL
892459	2015 NL_{31}	—	July 14, 2015	Haleakala	Pan-STARRS 1	·	560 m	MPC · JPL
892460	2015 NF_{34}	—	July 12, 2015	Haleakala	Pan-STARRS 1	·	1.4 km	MPC · JPL
892461	2015 NU_{37}	—	July 12, 2015	Haleakala	Pan-STARRS 1	·	570 m	MPC · JPL
892462	2015 OL_{16}	—	July 18, 2015	Haleakala	Pan-STARRS 1	·	820 m	MPC · JPL
892463	2015 OR_{18}	—	June 29, 2015	Haleakala	Pan-STARRS 1	·	1.0 km	MPC · JPL
892464	2015 OJ_{33}	—	July 24, 2015	Teide	Teide	·	1.3 km	MPC · JPL
892465	2015 OZ_{41}	—	August 28, 2006	Kitt Peak	Spacewatch	·	1.2 km	MPC · JPL
892466	2015 OM_{46}	—	June 15, 2015	Haleakala	Pan-STARRS 1	PHO	710 m	MPC · JPL
892467	2015 OC_{56}	—	March 24, 2014	Haleakala	Pan-STARRS 1	EUN	860 m	MPC · JPL
892468	2015 OX_{62}	—	December 24, 2011	Mount Lemmon	Mount Lemmon Survey	·	1.2 km	MPC · JPL
892469	2015 OH_{63}	—	July 26, 2015	Haleakala	Pan-STARRS 1	·	2.1 km	MPC · JPL
892470	2015 OM_{72}	—	June 18, 2015	Haleakala	Pan-STARRS 1	·	1.3 km	MPC · JPL
892471	2015 OO_{75}	—	July 23, 2015	Haleakala	Pan-STARRS 1	·	1.2 km	MPC · JPL
892472	2015 OM_{96}	—	October 25, 2011	Haleakala	Pan-STARRS 1	·	1.1 km	MPC · JPL
892473	2015 OA_{106}	—	July 19, 2015	Haleakala	Pan-STARRS 1	·	860 m	MPC · JPL
892474	2015 OX_{107}	—	July 24, 2015	Haleakala	Pan-STARRS 1	EUN	740 m	MPC · JPL
892475	2015 OU_{117}	—	July 23, 2015	Haleakala	Pan-STARRS 1	·	960 m	MPC · JPL
892476	2015 ON_{119}	—	July 18, 2015	Haleakala	Pan-STARRS 1	·	910 m	MPC · JPL
892477	2015 OV_{129}	—	July 24, 2015	Haleakala	Pan-STARRS 1	·	1.4 km	MPC · JPL
892478	2015 OF_{132}	—	July 19, 2015	Haleakala	Pan-STARRS 1	·	1.0 km	MPC · JPL
892479	2015 OV_{133}	—	July 24, 2015	Haleakala	Pan-STARRS 1	·	1.4 km	MPC · JPL
892480	2015 OD_{136}	—	July 25, 2015	Haleakala	Pan-STARRS 1	·	1.6 km	MPC · JPL
892481	2015 OK_{139}	—	July 28, 2015	Haleakala	Pan-STARRS 1	·	1.3 km	MPC · JPL
892482	2015 OY_{139}	—	July 25, 2015	Haleakala	Pan-STARRS 1	·	1.2 km	MPC · JPL
892483	2015 OH_{141}	—	July 25, 2015	Haleakala	Pan-STARRS 1	·	1.3 km	MPC · JPL
892484	2015 OO_{141}	—	July 28, 2015	Haleakala	Pan-STARRS 1	·	1.1 km	MPC · JPL
892485	2015 OC_{142}	—	July 19, 2015	Haleakala	Pan-STARRS 1	·	1.6 km	MPC · JPL
892486	2015 OA_{145}	—	July 25, 2015	Haleakala	Pan-STARRS 1	·	470 m	MPC · JPL
892487	2015 OF_{149}	—	July 23, 2015	Haleakala	Pan-STARRS 1	·	730 m	MPC · JPL
892488	2015 OH_{150}	—	July 23, 2015	Haleakala	Pan-STARRS 1	HNS	840 m	MPC · JPL
892489	2015 OF_{154}	—	July 26, 2015	Haleakala	Pan-STARRS 1	·	2.5 km	MPC · JPL
892490	2015 OE_{158}	—	March 5, 2013	Haleakala	Pan-STARRS 1	·	2.0 km	MPC · JPL
892491	2015 OW_{160}	—	July 25, 2015	Haleakala	Pan-STARRS 1	·	1.8 km	MPC · JPL
892492	2015 OT_{161}	—	July 23, 2015	Haleakala	Pan-STARRS 1	·	1.3 km	MPC · JPL
892493	2015 OC_{163}	—	November 17, 2011	Kitt Peak	Spacewatch	·	1.3 km	MPC · JPL
892494	2015 OG_{165}	—	July 25, 2015	Haleakala	Pan-STARRS 1	·	830 m	MPC · JPL
892495	2015 OP_{165}	—	July 19, 2015	Haleakala	Pan-STARRS 1	·	1.1 km	MPC · JPL
892496	2015 OR_{165}	—	July 24, 2015	Haleakala	Pan-STARRS 1	EUN	930 m	MPC · JPL
892497	2015 OO_{166}	—	July 25, 2015	Haleakala	Pan-STARRS 1	GAL	860 m	MPC · JPL
892498	2015 OJ_{170}	—	July 24, 2015	Haleakala	Pan-STARRS 1	·	650 m	MPC · JPL
892499	2015 OS_{175}	—	June 8, 2011	Mount Lemmon	Mount Lemmon Survey	·	750 m	MPC · JPL
892500	2015 OY_{182}	—	July 24, 2015	Haleakala	Pan-STARRS 1	·	1.2 km	MPC · JPL

== 892501–892600 ==
back to top

Designation			Discovery			Properties		Ref
Permanent	Provisional	Named after	Date	Site	Discoverer(s)	Category	Diam.	Ref
892501	2015 OP_{185}	—	July 28, 2015	Haleakala	Pan-STARRS 1	·	1.2 km	MPC · JPL
892502	2015 PT_{8}	—	July 26, 2015	Haleakala	Pan-STARRS 2	MAR	830 m	MPC · JPL
892503	2015 PM_{17}	—	July 27, 2015	Haleakala	Pan-STARRS 1	·	1.0 km	MPC · JPL
892504	2015 PH_{54}	—	August 9, 2015	Haleakala	Pan-STARRS 1	·	1.2 km	MPC · JPL
892505	2015 PZ_{64}	—	April 10, 2014	Haleakala	Pan-STARRS 1	EUN	890 m	MPC · JPL
892506	2015 PV_{71}	—	June 26, 2015	Haleakala	Pan-STARRS 1	·	1.1 km	MPC · JPL
892507	2015 PN_{98}	—	August 10, 2015	Haleakala	Pan-STARRS 1	·	1.2 km	MPC · JPL
892508	2015 PT_{101}	—	August 10, 2015	Haleakala	Pan-STARRS 1	·	650 m	MPC · JPL
892509	2015 PG_{106}	—	July 19, 2015	Haleakala	Pan-STARRS 1	·	1.1 km	MPC · JPL
892510	2015 PS_{115}	—	July 25, 2015	Haleakala	Pan-STARRS 1	·	1.2 km	MPC · JPL
892511	2015 PY_{117}	—	August 10, 2015	Haleakala	Pan-STARRS 1	EOS	990 m	MPC · JPL
892512	2015 PN_{124}	—	July 19, 2015	Haleakala	Pan-STARRS 2	·	540 m	MPC · JPL
892513	2015 PH_{135}	—	September 22, 2011	Kitt Peak	Spacewatch	·	1.0 km	MPC · JPL
892514	2015 PF_{138}	—	November 23, 2012	Kitt Peak	Spacewatch	·	290 m	MPC · JPL
892515	2015 PH_{149}	—	July 14, 2015	Haleakala	Pan-STARRS 1	·	1.0 km	MPC · JPL
892516	2015 PQ_{164}	—	August 10, 2015	Haleakala	Pan-STARRS 1	·	1.5 km	MPC · JPL
892517	2015 PD_{165}	—	August 10, 2015	Haleakala	Pan-STARRS 1	·	1.3 km	MPC · JPL
892518	2015 PF_{165}	—	August 10, 2015	Haleakala	Pan-STARRS 1	·	1.2 km	MPC · JPL
892519	2015 PU_{166}	—	August 10, 2015	Haleakala	Pan-STARRS 1	EUN	730 m	MPC · JPL
892520	2015 PF_{169}	—	July 25, 2015	Haleakala	Pan-STARRS 1	·	1.4 km	MPC · JPL
892521	2015 PA_{176}	—	October 27, 2011	Mount Lemmon	Mount Lemmon Survey	·	1.2 km	MPC · JPL
892522	2015 PU_{176}	—	February 26, 2014	Haleakala	Pan-STARRS 1	·	720 m	MPC · JPL
892523	2015 PY_{183}	—	August 10, 2015	Haleakala	Pan-STARRS 1	·	1.1 km	MPC · JPL
892524	2015 PJ_{187}	—	October 30, 2011	Kitt Peak	Spacewatch	AGN	730 m	MPC · JPL
892525	2015 PK_{199}	—	August 10, 2015	Haleakala	Pan-STARRS 1	EOS	1.2 km	MPC · JPL
892526	2015 PS_{201}	—	July 24, 2015	Haleakala	Pan-STARRS 1	·	1.4 km	MPC · JPL
892527	2015 PB_{203}	—	August 10, 2015	Haleakala	Pan-STARRS 1	·	1.3 km	MPC · JPL
892528	2015 PZ_{206}	—	August 10, 2015	Haleakala	Pan-STARRS 1	HNS	870 m	MPC · JPL
892529	2015 PH_{208}	—	September 13, 2007	Mount Lemmon	Mount Lemmon Survey	HNS	790 m	MPC · JPL
892530	2015 PJ_{214}	—	August 10, 2015	Haleakala	Pan-STARRS 1	·	1.5 km	MPC · JPL
892531	2015 PM_{225}	—	August 10, 2015	Haleakala	Pan-STARRS 1	·	2.3 km	MPC · JPL
892532	2015 PL_{232}	—	June 26, 2015	Haleakala	Pan-STARRS 1	·	1.3 km	MPC · JPL
892533	2015 PR_{243}	—	September 24, 2011	Haleakala	Pan-STARRS 1	·	1.3 km	MPC · JPL
892534	2015 PF_{253}	—	August 10, 2015	Haleakala	Pan-STARRS 1	EOS	1.1 km	MPC · JPL
892535	2015 PS_{255}	—	June 26, 2015	Haleakala	Pan-STARRS 1	·	460 m	MPC · JPL
892536	2015 PG_{257}	—	June 18, 2015	Haleakala	Pan-STARRS 1	·	480 m	MPC · JPL
892537	2015 PM_{261}	—	August 10, 2015	Haleakala	Pan-STARRS 1	H	230 m	MPC · JPL
892538	2015 PW_{261}	—	November 3, 2011	Mount Lemmon	Mount Lemmon Survey	·	1 km	MPC · JPL
892539	2015 PC_{263}	—	October 8, 2012	Mount Lemmon	Mount Lemmon Survey	·	470 m	MPC · JPL
892540	2015 PB_{265}	—	January 19, 2013	Kitt Peak	Spacewatch	·	1.1 km	MPC · JPL
892541	2015 PF_{270}	—	November 19, 2007	Kitt Peak	Spacewatch	·	1.2 km	MPC · JPL
892542	2015 PT_{283}	—	August 12, 2015	Haleakala	Pan-STARRS 1	·	1.2 km	MPC · JPL
892543	2015 PQ_{285}	—	July 24, 2015	Haleakala	Pan-STARRS 1	·	1.5 km	MPC · JPL
892544	2015 PC_{318}	—	August 9, 2015	Haleakala	Pan-STARRS 1	·	700 m	MPC · JPL
892545	2015 PB_{324}	—	August 12, 2015	Haleakala	Pan-STARRS 1	·	2.0 km	MPC · JPL
892546	2015 PC_{331}	—	August 12, 2015	Haleakala	Pan-STARRS 1	·	520 m	MPC · JPL
892547	2015 PW_{333}	—	August 6, 2015	Haleakala	Pan-STARRS 1	·	1.4 km	MPC · JPL
892548	2015 PH_{335}	—	July 24, 2015	Haleakala	Pan-STARRS 1	EOS	1.3 km	MPC · JPL
892549	2015 PT_{337}	—	August 14, 2015	Haleakala	Pan-STARRS 1	·	1.3 km	MPC · JPL
892550	2015 PS_{343}	—	August 12, 2015	Haleakala	Pan-STARRS 1	·	480 m	MPC · JPL
892551	2015 PH_{345}	—	August 9, 2015	Haleakala	Pan-STARRS 1	·	1.1 km	MPC · JPL
892552	2015 PH_{354}	—	August 13, 2015	Haleakala	Pan-STARRS 1	·	440 m	MPC · JPL
892553	2015 PM_{356}	—	August 11, 2015	Haleakala	Pan-STARRS 1	(194)	1.0 km	MPC · JPL
892554	2015 PN_{357}	—	August 8, 2015	Haleakala	Pan-STARRS 1	MAR	800 m	MPC · JPL
892555	2015 PM_{371}	—	August 10, 2015	Haleakala	Pan-STARRS 1	·	1.3 km	MPC · JPL
892556	2015 PW_{371}	—	August 12, 2015	Haleakala	Pan-STARRS 1	·	1.0 km	MPC · JPL
892557	2015 QD_{12}	—	August 21, 2015	Haleakala	Pan-STARRS 1	·	1.6 km	MPC · JPL
892558	2015 QR_{12}	—	August 10, 2010	Kitt Peak	Spacewatch	KOR	1.0 km	MPC · JPL
892559	2015 QT_{22}	—	August 21, 2015	Haleakala	Pan-STARRS 1	·	2.0 km	MPC · JPL
892560	2015 QG_{30}	—	August 21, 2015	Haleakala	Pan-STARRS 1	·	1.2 km	MPC · JPL
892561	2015 QU_{31}	—	August 21, 2015	Haleakala	Pan-STARRS 1	·	530 m	MPC · JPL
892562	2015 QV_{35}	—	August 21, 2015	Haleakala	Pan-STARRS 1	·	1.6 km	MPC · JPL
892563	2015 QO_{42}	—	August 21, 2015	Haleakala	Pan-STARRS 1	·	740 m	MPC · JPL
892564	2015 QL_{45}	—	August 21, 2015	Haleakala	Pan-STARRS 1	·	1.0 km	MPC · JPL
892565	2015 RO_{13}	—	June 17, 2015	Haleakala	Pan-STARRS 1	·	530 m	MPC · JPL
892566	2015 RK_{42}	—	December 13, 2012	Mount Lemmon	Mount Lemmon Survey	·	520 m	MPC · JPL
892567	2015 RL_{75}	—	September 10, 2015	Haleakala	Pan-STARRS 1	·	990 m	MPC · JPL
892568	2015 RE_{79}	—	September 4, 2011	Haleakala	Pan-STARRS 1	·	890 m	MPC · JPL
892569	2015 RB_{129}	—	September 9, 2015	Haleakala	Pan-STARRS 1	·	1.2 km	MPC · JPL
892570	2015 RB_{132}	—	March 6, 2013	Haleakala	Pan-STARRS 1	EOS	1.2 km	MPC · JPL
892571	2015 RL_{145}	—	February 26, 2014	Haleakala	Pan-STARRS 1	·	740 m	MPC · JPL
892572	2015 RW_{165}	—	November 2, 2006	Apache Point	SDSS Collaboration	·	1.4 km	MPC · JPL
892573	2015 RD_{172}	—	July 23, 2015	Haleakala	Pan-STARRS 1	·	1.2 km	MPC · JPL
892574	2015 RX_{172}	—	September 9, 2015	Haleakala	Pan-STARRS 1	THM	1.6 km	MPC · JPL
892575	2015 RH_{180}	—	September 9, 2015	Haleakala	Pan-STARRS 1	·	1.3 km	MPC · JPL
892576	2015 RZ_{182}	—	September 9, 2015	Haleakala	Pan-STARRS 1	·	980 m	MPC · JPL
892577	2015 RS_{191}	—	September 11, 2015	Haleakala	Pan-STARRS 1	·	1.2 km	MPC · JPL
892578	2015 RC_{195}	—	October 19, 2010	Mount Lemmon	Mount Lemmon Survey	·	1.2 km	MPC · JPL
892579	2015 RB_{218}	—	September 11, 2015	Haleakala	Pan-STARRS 1	·	1.3 km	MPC · JPL
892580	2015 RL_{221}	—	September 11, 2015	Haleakala	Pan-STARRS 1	·	1.6 km	MPC · JPL
892581	2015 RC_{226}	—	November 5, 2010	Kitt Peak	Spacewatch	·	1.2 km	MPC · JPL
892582	2015 RF_{227}	—	September 11, 2015	Haleakala	Pan-STARRS 1	·	1.1 km	MPC · JPL
892583	2015 RM_{227}	—	November 30, 2011	Mount Lemmon	Mount Lemmon Survey	·	1.1 km	MPC · JPL
892584	2015 RG_{232}	—	August 12, 2015	Haleakala	Pan-STARRS 1	·	520 m	MPC · JPL
892585	2015 RA_{241}	—	September 11, 2015	Haleakala	Pan-STARRS 1	·	1.4 km	MPC · JPL
892586	2015 RP_{241}	—	August 12, 2015	Haleakala	Pan-STARRS 1	·	1.5 km	MPC · JPL
892587	2015 RV_{247}	—	July 19, 2015	Haleakala	Pan-STARRS 1	·	1.5 km	MPC · JPL
892588	2015 RT_{248}	—	September 9, 2015	Haleakala	Pan-STARRS 1	·	1.3 km	MPC · JPL
892589	2015 RU_{250}	—	September 11, 2015	Haleakala	Pan-STARRS 1	·	1.4 km	MPC · JPL
892590	2015 RY_{250}	—	September 11, 2015	Haleakala	Pan-STARRS 1	THM	1.5 km	MPC · JPL
892591	2015 RA_{251}	—	September 11, 2015	Haleakala	Pan-STARRS 1	·	1.4 km	MPC · JPL
892592	2015 RH_{252}	—	September 12, 2015	Haleakala	Pan-STARRS 1	·	1.4 km	MPC · JPL
892593	2015 RP_{253}	—	October 17, 2010	Mount Lemmon	Mount Lemmon Survey	·	1.4 km	MPC · JPL
892594	2015 RP_{257}	—	September 10, 2015	Haleakala	Pan-STARRS 1	·	1.2 km	MPC · JPL
892595	2015 RP_{272}	—	October 12, 2007	Kitt Peak	Spacewatch	·	940 m	MPC · JPL
892596	2015 RU_{276}	—	September 12, 2015	Haleakala	Pan-STARRS 1	VER	1.8 km	MPC · JPL
892597	2015 RE_{282}	—	September 9, 2015	Haleakala	Pan-STARRS 1	·	1.0 km	MPC · JPL
892598	2015 RW_{291}	—	September 9, 2015	Haleakala	Pan-STARRS 1	·	1.1 km	MPC · JPL
892599	2015 RJ_{296}	—	July 28, 2015	Haleakala	Pan-STARRS 1	·	660 m	MPC · JPL
892600	2015 RS_{297}	—	September 12, 2015	Haleakala	Pan-STARRS 1	·	1.1 km	MPC · JPL

== 892601–892700 ==
back to top

Designation			Discovery			Properties		Ref
Permanent	Provisional	Named after	Date	Site	Discoverer(s)	Category	Diam.	Ref
892601	2015 RV_{299}	—	May 7, 2014	Haleakala	Pan-STARRS 1	·	930 m	MPC · JPL
892602	2015 RM_{305}	—	September 6, 2015	Haleakala	Pan-STARRS 1	·	470 m	MPC · JPL
892603	2015 RO_{308}	—	September 11, 2015	Haleakala	Pan-STARRS 1	THM	1.5 km	MPC · JPL
892604	2015 RP_{311}	—	September 12, 2015	Haleakala	Pan-STARRS 1	·	1.4 km	MPC · JPL
892605	2015 RW_{316}	—	September 9, 2015	Haleakala	Pan-STARRS 1	·	1.4 km	MPC · JPL
892606	2015 RC_{321}	—	September 6, 2015	Kitt Peak	Spacewatch	·	1.2 km	MPC · JPL
892607	2015 RV_{321}	—	September 9, 2015	Haleakala	Pan-STARRS 1	·	2.0 km	MPC · JPL
892608	2015 RJ_{323}	—	September 12, 2015	Haleakala	Pan-STARRS 1	·	1.3 km	MPC · JPL
892609	2015 RU_{323}	—	September 12, 2015	Haleakala	Pan-STARRS 1	NEM	1.5 km	MPC · JPL
892610	2015 RD_{325}	—	September 4, 2015	Kitt Peak	Spacewatch	·	1.1 km	MPC · JPL
892611	2015 RV_{325}	—	September 9, 2015	Haleakala	Pan-STARRS 1	GEF	740 m	MPC · JPL
892612	2015 RC_{328}	—	September 9, 2015	Haleakala	Pan-STARRS 1	·	1.1 km	MPC · JPL
892613	2015 RB_{332}	—	September 12, 2015	Haleakala	Pan-STARRS 1	·	500 m	MPC · JPL
892614	2015 RZ_{334}	—	September 12, 2015	Haleakala	Pan-STARRS 1	·	1.2 km	MPC · JPL
892615	2015 RK_{336}	—	September 10, 2015	Haleakala	Pan-STARRS 1	·	760 m	MPC · JPL
892616	2015 RY_{340}	—	September 12, 2015	Haleakala	Pan-STARRS 1	·	1.2 km	MPC · JPL
892617	2015 RT_{341}	—	August 26, 1998	Kitt Peak	Spacewatch	·	430 m	MPC · JPL
892618	2015 RQ_{346}	—	September 9, 2015	Haleakala	Pan-STARRS 1	MRX	650 m	MPC · JPL
892619	2015 RD_{354}	—	January 29, 2009	Mount Lemmon	Mount Lemmon Survey	·	1.1 km	MPC · JPL
892620	2015 RJ_{354}	—	September 10, 2015	Haleakala	Pan-STARRS 1	·	2.1 km	MPC · JPL
892621	2015 RA_{355}	—	September 6, 2015	Haleakala	Pan-STARRS 1	EUN	790 m	MPC · JPL
892622	2015 RV_{358}	—	September 6, 2015	Haleakala	Pan-STARRS 1	·	2.2 km	MPC · JPL
892623	2015 RC_{363}	—	September 12, 2015	Haleakala	Pan-STARRS 1	·	1.1 km	MPC · JPL
892624	2015 RH_{365}	—	May 21, 2014	Haleakala	Pan-STARRS 1	(5)	780 m	MPC · JPL
892625	2015 RY_{372}	—	July 25, 2011	Haleakala	Pan-STARRS 1	·	540 m	MPC · JPL
892626	2015 RB_{384}	—	September 11, 2015	Haleakala	Pan-STARRS 1	·	1.0 km	MPC · JPL
892627	2015 RH_{392}	—	September 9, 2015	Haleakala	Pan-STARRS 1	·	1.2 km	MPC · JPL
892628	2015 RB_{393}	—	September 11, 2015	Haleakala	Pan-STARRS 1	·	1.2 km	MPC · JPL
892629	2015 RX_{393}	—	September 10, 2015	Haleakala	Pan-STARRS 1	·	1.1 km	MPC · JPL
892630	2015 SD_{2}	—	September 19, 2015	Mount Lemmon	Mount Lemmon Survey	HNS	660 m	MPC · JPL
892631	2015 SQ_{27}	—	September 23, 2015	Haleakala	Pan-STARRS 1	·	1.6 km	MPC · JPL
892632	2015 SK_{34}	—	September 24, 2015	Mount Lemmon	Mount Lemmon Survey	·	1.5 km	MPC · JPL
892633	2015 SL_{36}	—	September 23, 2015	Haleakala	Pan-STARRS 1	EUN	790 m	MPC · JPL
892634	2015 SY_{36}	—	September 23, 2015	Haleakala	Pan-STARRS 1	·	1.2 km	MPC · JPL
892635	2015 SD_{37}	—	September 23, 2015	Haleakala	Pan-STARRS 1	·	510 m	MPC · JPL
892636	2015 SE_{37}	—	September 23, 2015	Haleakala	Pan-STARRS 1	PAD	990 m	MPC · JPL
892637	2015 SF_{41}	—	September 24, 2015	Mount Lemmon	Mount Lemmon Survey	·	2.2 km	MPC · JPL
892638	2015 SG_{41}	—	September 23, 2015	Mount Lemmon	Mount Lemmon Survey	·	490 m	MPC · JPL
892639	2015 SQ_{42}	—	December 28, 2011	Kitt Peak	Spacewatch	·	1.8 km	MPC · JPL
892640	2015 SA_{45}	—	September 23, 2015	Mount Lemmon	Mount Lemmon Survey	·	960 m	MPC · JPL
892641	2015 SX_{45}	—	September 23, 2015	Haleakala	Pan-STARRS 1	·	1.2 km	MPC · JPL
892642	2015 SE_{48}	—	September 23, 2015	Haleakala	Pan-STARRS 1	·	1.2 km	MPC · JPL
892643	2015 SL_{48}	—	September 23, 2015	Haleakala	Pan-STARRS 1	V	500 m	MPC · JPL
892644	2015 SG_{49}	—	September 24, 2015	Mount Lemmon	Mount Lemmon Survey	·	1.4 km	MPC · JPL
892645	2015 SK_{54}	—	September 24, 2015	Mount Lemmon	Mount Lemmon Survey	·	1.0 km	MPC · JPL
892646	2015 SO_{59}	—	September 23, 2015	Mount Lemmon	Mount Lemmon Survey	·	1.2 km	MPC · JPL
892647	2015 TY_{31}	—	August 14, 2015	Haleakala	Pan-STARRS 1	·	1.1 km	MPC · JPL
892648	2015 TJ_{33}	—	September 28, 2011	Kitt Peak	Spacewatch	EUN	790 m	MPC · JPL
892649	2015 TL_{44}	—	September 10, 2015	Haleakala	Pan-STARRS 1	·	1.0 km	MPC · JPL
892650	2015 TG_{55}	—	July 23, 2015	Haleakala	Pan-STARRS 1	·	1.5 km	MPC · JPL
892651	2015 TA_{74}	—	October 14, 2004	Kitt Peak	Spacewatch	·	2.0 km	MPC · JPL
892652	2015 TN_{92}	—	October 8, 2015	Haleakala	Pan-STARRS 1	EUN	790 m	MPC · JPL
892653	2015 TZ_{92}	—	October 12, 2007	Mount Lemmon	Mount Lemmon Survey	·	980 m	MPC · JPL
892654	2015 TD_{99}	—	September 9, 2015	Haleakala	Pan-STARRS 1	·	1.3 km	MPC · JPL
892655	2015 TE_{104}	—	October 8, 2015	Haleakala	Pan-STARRS 1	·	520 m	MPC · JPL
892656	2015 TS_{109}	—	October 8, 2015	Haleakala	Pan-STARRS 1	·	1.5 km	MPC · JPL
892657	2015 TC_{116}	—	October 8, 2015	Haleakala	Pan-STARRS 1	·	1.6 km	MPC · JPL
892658	2015 TY_{117}	—	October 8, 2015	Haleakala	Pan-STARRS 1	H	340 m	MPC · JPL
892659	2015 TX_{119}	—	October 8, 2015	Haleakala	Pan-STARRS 1	(18466)	1.3 km	MPC · JPL
892660	2015 TT_{125}	—	September 12, 2015	Haleakala	Pan-STARRS 1	·	1.3 km	MPC · JPL
892661	2015 TS_{132}	—	January 2, 2012	Mount Lemmon	Mount Lemmon Survey	GEF	700 m	MPC · JPL
892662	2015 TK_{133}	—	September 11, 2015	Haleakala	Pan-STARRS 1	·	1.1 km	MPC · JPL
892663	2015 TO_{133}	—	September 12, 2015	Haleakala	Pan-STARRS 1	·	1.6 km	MPC · JPL
892664	2015 TM_{139}	—	October 8, 2015	Haleakala	Pan-STARRS 1	·	1.5 km	MPC · JPL
892665	2015 TZ_{140}	—	September 12, 2015	Haleakala	Pan-STARRS 1	·	1.7 km	MPC · JPL
892666	2015 TF_{153}	—	October 17, 2010	Mount Lemmon	Mount Lemmon Survey	·	1.3 km	MPC · JPL
892667	2015 TW_{171}	—	January 29, 2011	Mount Lemmon	Mount Lemmon Survey	·	1.8 km	MPC · JPL
892668	2015 TO_{173}	—	October 9, 2015	Haleakala	Pan-STARRS 1	·	1.4 km	MPC · JPL
892669	2015 TA_{178}	—	October 12, 2015	Mount Lemmon	Mount Lemmon Survey	H	300 m	MPC · JPL
892670	2015 TN_{189}	—	September 18, 2015	Catalina	CSS	·	1.8 km	MPC · JPL
892671	2015 TZ_{212}	—	July 23, 2015	Haleakala	Pan-STARRS 1	·	1.5 km	MPC · JPL
892672	2015 TH_{236}	—	October 11, 2015	Mount Lemmon	Mount Lemmon Survey	·	1.3 km	MPC · JPL
892673	2015 TM_{237}	—	October 8, 2015	Haleakala	Pan-STARRS 1	APO +1km · PHA	840 m	MPC · JPL
892674	2015 TJ_{248}	—	October 2, 2015	Mount Lemmon	Mount Lemmon Survey	VER	1.8 km	MPC · JPL
892675	2015 TG_{250}	—	October 12, 2015	Mount Lemmon	Mount Lemmon Survey	·	2.5 km	MPC · JPL
892676	2015 TX_{253}	—	September 3, 2010	Mount Lemmon	Mount Lemmon Survey	·	1.3 km	MPC · JPL
892677	2015 TF_{254}	—	September 9, 2015	Haleakala	Pan-STARRS 1	·	430 m	MPC · JPL
892678	2015 TD_{266}	—	January 3, 2012	Kitt Peak	Spacewatch	·	1.1 km	MPC · JPL
892679	2015 TP_{270}	—	September 12, 2015	Haleakala	Pan-STARRS 1	HNS	770 m	MPC · JPL
892680	2015 TU_{272}	—	September 12, 2015	Haleakala	Pan-STARRS 1	·	1.2 km	MPC · JPL
892681	2015 TW_{275}	—	October 17, 2010	Mount Lemmon	Mount Lemmon Survey	EOS	1.3 km	MPC · JPL
892682	2015 TF_{276}	—	September 12, 2015	Haleakala	Pan-STARRS 1	·	1.4 km	MPC · JPL
892683	2015 TC_{289}	—	July 23, 2015	Haleakala	Pan-STARRS 1	·	490 m	MPC · JPL
892684	2015 TT_{289}	—	October 12, 2015	Space Surveillance	Space Surveillance Telescope	·	1.8 km	MPC · JPL
892685	2015 TO_{297}	—	September 25, 2015	Mount Lemmon	Mount Lemmon Survey	·	1.3 km	MPC · JPL
892686	2015 TT_{314}	—	October 2, 2015	Mount Lemmon	Mount Lemmon Survey	·	2.1 km	MPC · JPL
892687	2015 TS_{341}	—	July 25, 2015	Haleakala	Pan-STARRS 1	H	290 m	MPC · JPL
892688	2015 TT_{341}	—	April 8, 2014	Mount Lemmon	Mount Lemmon Survey	MAR	740 m	MPC · JPL
892689	2015 TF_{345}	—	October 10, 2015	Haleakala	Pan-STARRS 1	·	1.3 km	MPC · JPL
892690	2015 TR_{354}	—	October 8, 2015	Haleakala	Pan-STARRS 1	·	1.1 km	MPC · JPL
892691	2015 TZ_{354}	—	October 8, 2015	Haleakala	Pan-STARRS 1	·	1.2 km	MPC · JPL
892692	2015 TH_{358}	—	October 12, 2015	Haleakala	Pan-STARRS 1	·	1.6 km	MPC · JPL
892693	2015 TX_{370}	—	May 8, 2014	Haleakala	Pan-STARRS 1	·	970 m	MPC · JPL
892694	2015 TN_{377}	—	January 2, 2012	Mount Lemmon	Mount Lemmon Survey	·	1.1 km	MPC · JPL
892695	2015 TY_{383}	—	October 12, 2015	Haleakala	Pan-STARRS 1	·	1.3 km	MPC · JPL
892696	2015 TQ_{384}	—	January 8, 2009	Kitt Peak	Spacewatch	·	860 m	MPC · JPL
892697	2015 TH_{387}	—	October 3, 2015	Haleakala	Pan-STARRS 1	·	2.0 km	MPC · JPL
892698	2015 TO_{387}	—	October 11, 2015	Mount Lemmon	Mount Lemmon Survey	·	1.7 km	MPC · JPL
892699	2015 TW_{388}	—	October 15, 2015	Haleakala	Pan-STARRS 1	·	1.4 km	MPC · JPL
892700	2015 TC_{389}	—	October 12, 2015	Haleakala	Pan-STARRS 1	·	1.4 km	MPC · JPL

== 892701–892800 ==
back to top

Designation			Discovery			Properties		Ref
Permanent	Provisional	Named after	Date	Site	Discoverer(s)	Category	Diam.	Ref
892701	2015 TH_{389}	—	October 10, 2015	Haleakala	Pan-STARRS 1	·	500 m	MPC · JPL
892702	2015 TF_{390}	—	October 15, 2015	Haleakala	Pan-STARRS 1	·	1.4 km	MPC · JPL
892703	2015 TV_{392}	—	September 20, 2015	Catalina	CSS	DOR	1.7 km	MPC · JPL
892704	2015 TM_{393}	—	October 10, 2015	Haleakala	Pan-STARRS 1	H	340 m	MPC · JPL
892705	2015 TU_{399}	—	October 12, 2015	Haleakala	Pan-STARRS 1	·	480 m	MPC · JPL
892706	2015 TP_{402}	—	October 12, 2015	Haleakala	Pan-STARRS 1	·	1.5 km	MPC · JPL
892707	2015 TF_{404}	—	October 10, 2015	Kitt Peak	Spacewatch	·	2.3 km	MPC · JPL
892708	2015 TD_{409}	—	October 9, 2015	Haleakala	Pan-STARRS 1	·	1.0 km	MPC · JPL
892709	2015 TK_{409}	—	October 10, 2015	Haleakala	Pan-STARRS 1	HOF	1.8 km	MPC · JPL
892710	2015 TQ_{413}	—	October 9, 2015	Haleakala	Pan-STARRS 1	·	1.2 km	MPC · JPL
892711	2015 TZ_{418}	—	October 2, 2015	Mount Lemmon	Mount Lemmon Survey	·	500 m	MPC · JPL
892712	2015 TB_{421}	—	October 12, 2015	Haleakala	Pan-STARRS 1	·	370 m	MPC · JPL
892713	2015 TN_{422}	—	October 9, 2015	Haleakala	Pan-STARRS 1	·	1.8 km	MPC · JPL
892714	2015 TZ_{425}	—	October 8, 2015	Haleakala	Pan-STARRS 1	·	2.1 km	MPC · JPL
892715	2015 TN_{429}	—	October 12, 2015	Haleakala	Pan-STARRS 1	·	1.5 km	MPC · JPL
892716	2015 TP_{431}	—	October 8, 2015	Haleakala	Pan-STARRS 1	·	510 m	MPC · JPL
892717	2015 TL_{438}	—	October 8, 2015	Haleakala	Pan-STARRS 1	·	1.1 km	MPC · JPL
892718	2015 TV_{440}	—	October 13, 2015	Haleakala	Pan-STARRS 1	·	1.1 km	MPC · JPL
892719	2015 TF_{442}	—	October 2, 2015	Mount Lemmon	Mount Lemmon Survey	·	1.1 km	MPC · JPL
892720	2015 TN_{442}	—	October 10, 2015	Haleakala	Pan-STARRS 1	·	1.6 km	MPC · JPL
892721	2015 TS_{442}	—	October 15, 2015	Haleakala	Pan-STARRS 1	615	770 m	MPC · JPL
892722	2015 TD_{443}	—	October 12, 2015	Haleakala	Pan-STARRS 1	·	440 m	MPC · JPL
892723	2015 TX_{457}	—	October 9, 2008	Kitt Peak	Spacewatch	·	490 m	MPC · JPL
892724	2015 TT_{461}	—	October 10, 2015	Haleakala	Pan-STARRS 1	·	1.2 km	MPC · JPL
892725	2015 TY_{466}	—	September 17, 2010	Mount Lemmon	Mount Lemmon Survey	·	1.3 km	MPC · JPL
892726	2015 TJ_{469}	—	October 15, 2015	Haleakala	Pan-STARRS 1	·	1.0 km	MPC · JPL
892727	2015 TS_{469}	—	October 8, 2015	Haleakala	Pan-STARRS 1	·	1.1 km	MPC · JPL
892728	2015 TS_{476}	—	October 10, 2015	Haleakala	Pan-STARRS 1	·	1.3 km	MPC · JPL
892729	2015 TD_{477}	—	October 15, 2015	Haleakala	Pan-STARRS 1	·	1.2 km	MPC · JPL
892730	2015 TY_{494}	—	October 10, 2015	Haleakala	Pan-STARRS 1	·	1.3 km	MPC · JPL
892731	2015 TA_{497}	—	October 10, 2015	Haleakala	Pan-STARRS 1	·	1.2 km	MPC · JPL
892732	2015 UK_{3}	—	November 8, 2010	Mount Lemmon	Mount Lemmon Survey	·	1.2 km	MPC · JPL
892733	2015 UE_{22}	—	October 18, 2015	Haleakala	Pan-STARRS 1	526	1.4 km	MPC · JPL
892734	2015 UA_{23}	—	August 21, 2015	Haleakala	Pan-STARRS 1	HNS	790 m	MPC · JPL
892735	2015 UF_{27}	—	October 18, 2015	Haleakala	Pan-STARRS 1	NEM	1.5 km	MPC · JPL
892736	2015 UC_{29}	—	October 25, 2011	Haleakala	Pan-STARRS 1	ADE	1.4 km	MPC · JPL
892737	2015 UY_{29}	—	October 18, 2015	Haleakala	Pan-STARRS 1	·	480 m	MPC · JPL
892738	2015 UT_{36}	—	October 31, 2006	Mount Lemmon	Mount Lemmon Survey	·	1.2 km	MPC · JPL
892739	2015 US_{37}	—	October 2, 2015	Mount Lemmon	Mount Lemmon Survey	·	470 m	MPC · JPL
892740	2015 UU_{45}	—	October 9, 2015	Haleakala	Pan-STARRS 1	·	1.3 km	MPC · JPL
892741	2015 UO_{71}	—	September 23, 2015	Haleakala	Pan-STARRS 1	·	480 m	MPC · JPL
892742	2015 UV_{88}	—	July 8, 2014	Haleakala	Pan-STARRS 1	·	2.2 km	MPC · JPL
892743	2015 UK_{91}	—	October 19, 2015	Haleakala	Pan-STARRS 1	·	1.5 km	MPC · JPL
892744	2015 UM_{91}	—	October 24, 2015	Mount Lemmon	Mount Lemmon Survey	·	1.9 km	MPC · JPL
892745	2015 UP_{104}	—	October 23, 2015	Mount Lemmon	Mount Lemmon Survey	AEO	720 m	MPC · JPL
892746	2015 UP_{105}	—	October 24, 2015	Mount Lemmon	Mount Lemmon Survey	·	1.4 km	MPC · JPL
892747	2015 UA_{109}	—	October 22, 2015	Haleakala	Pan-STARRS 1	·	360 m	MPC · JPL
892748	2015 UE_{114}	—	October 18, 2015	Haleakala	Pan-STARRS 1	·	1.3 km	MPC · JPL
892749	2015 VQ_{7}	—	September 6, 2015	Haleakala	Pan-STARRS 1	·	400 m	MPC · JPL
892750	2015 VO_{11}	—	September 12, 2015	Haleakala	Pan-STARRS 1	HNS	730 m	MPC · JPL
892751	2015 VE_{20}	—	October 26, 2008	Pises	J.-M. Lopez, J.-P. Sombart	·	570 m	MPC · JPL
892752	2015 VO_{21}	—	October 25, 2001	Kitt Peak	Spacewatch	·	1.1 km	MPC · JPL
892753	2015 VA_{44}	—	June 27, 2015	Haleakala	Pan-STARRS 1	·	500 m	MPC · JPL
892754	2015 VH_{45}	—	September 4, 2011	Haleakala	Pan-STARRS 1	·	1.0 km	MPC · JPL
892755	2015 VR_{46}	—	September 15, 2006	Kitt Peak	Spacewatch	·	1.2 km	MPC · JPL
892756	2015 VD_{49}	—	September 9, 2015	XuYi	PMO NEO Survey Program	·	390 m	MPC · JPL
892757	2015 VA_{59}	—	October 12, 2015	Haleakala	Pan-STARRS 1	·	1.2 km	MPC · JPL
892758	2015 VJ_{63}	—	November 2, 2015	Haleakala	Pan-STARRS 1	·	530 m	MPC · JPL
892759	2015 VR_{68}	—	October 13, 2015	Mount Lemmon	Mount Lemmon Survey	·	480 m	MPC · JPL
892760	2015 VG_{81}	—	October 10, 2015	Haleakala	Pan-STARRS 1	·	1.2 km	MPC · JPL
892761	2015 VB_{88}	—	September 9, 2015	Haleakala	Pan-STARRS 1	·	640 m	MPC · JPL
892762	2015 VU_{89}	—	September 25, 2008	Kitt Peak	Spacewatch	·	380 m	MPC · JPL
892763	2015 VQ_{98}	—	November 1, 2015	Kitt Peak	Spacewatch	BRA	950 m	MPC · JPL
892764	2015 VT_{98}	—	December 23, 2012	Haleakala	Pan-STARRS 1	·	420 m	MPC · JPL
892765	2015 VE_{111}	—	October 7, 2008	Kitt Peak	Spacewatch	·	470 m	MPC · JPL
892766	2015 VG_{118}	—	November 12, 2012	Mount Lemmon	Mount Lemmon Survey	·	460 m	MPC · JPL
892767	2015 VA_{137}	—	November 8, 2015	Kitt Peak	Spacewatch	·	2.1 km	MPC · JPL
892768	2015 VQ_{143}	—	September 9, 2015	Haleakala	Pan-STARRS 1	·	1.1 km	MPC · JPL
892769	2015 VX_{143}	—	January 3, 2012	Mount Lemmon	Mount Lemmon Survey	·	1.2 km	MPC · JPL
892770	2015 VA_{149}	—	October 21, 2015	Haleakala	Pan-STARRS 1	·	1.3 km	MPC · JPL
892771	2015 VH_{158}	—	January 5, 2006	Kitt Peak	Spacewatch	·	1.1 km	MPC · JPL
892772	2015 VN_{158}	—	January 19, 2012	Haleakala	Pan-STARRS 1	·	1.2 km	MPC · JPL
892773	2015 VX_{158}	—	November 2, 2015	Haleakala	Pan-STARRS 1	DOR	1.5 km	MPC · JPL
892774	2015 VH_{159}	—	January 29, 2011	Mount Lemmon	Mount Lemmon Survey	·	2.7 km	MPC · JPL
892775	2015 VV_{160}	—	October 13, 2010	Kitt Peak	Spacewatch	·	1.3 km	MPC · JPL
892776	2015 VZ_{162}	—	November 13, 2015	Kitt Peak	Spacewatch	·	1.3 km	MPC · JPL
892777	2015 VV_{174}	—	November 10, 2015	Mount Lemmon	Mount Lemmon Survey	·	1.4 km	MPC · JPL
892778	2015 VT_{184}	—	November 1, 2015	Haleakala	Pan-STARRS 1	·	1.2 km	MPC · JPL
892779	2015 VP_{187}	—	November 14, 2015	Mount Lemmon	Mount Lemmon Survey	·	450 m	MPC · JPL
892780	2015 VT_{187}	—	November 12, 2015	Mount Lemmon	Mount Lemmon Survey	·	1.4 km	MPC · JPL
892781	2015 VQ_{195}	—	November 13, 2015	Kitt Peak	Spacewatch	·	530 m	MPC · JPL
892782	2015 VJ_{196}	—	November 8, 2015	Mount Lemmon	Mount Lemmon Survey	·	1.5 km	MPC · JPL
892783	2015 VZ_{196}	—	November 7, 2015	Mount Lemmon	Mount Lemmon Survey	PAD	1.2 km	MPC · JPL
892784	2015 VH_{199}	—	November 8, 2015	Mount Lemmon	Mount Lemmon Survey	·	2.2 km	MPC · JPL
892785	2015 VL_{200}	—	November 10, 2015	Mount Lemmon	Mount Lemmon Survey	·	1.1 km	MPC · JPL
892786	2015 VM_{205}	—	November 13, 2015	Kitt Peak	Spacewatch	·	1.3 km	MPC · JPL
892787	2015 VA_{206}	—	November 3, 2015	Mount Lemmon	Mount Lemmon Survey	·	1.3 km	MPC · JPL
892788	2015 VE_{206}	—	November 2, 2015	Haleakala	Pan-STARRS 1	MRX	700 m	MPC · JPL
892789	2015 VM_{207}	—	November 13, 2015	Mount Lemmon	Mount Lemmon Survey	·	410 m	MPC · JPL
892790	2015 WD	—	November 17, 2015	Haleakala	Pan-STARRS 1	H	310 m	MPC · JPL
892791	2015 WS_{7}	—	October 26, 2008	Kitt Peak	Spacewatch	·	440 m	MPC · JPL
892792	2015 WD_{20}	—	January 26, 2012	Mount Lemmon	Mount Lemmon Survey	AEO	700 m	MPC · JPL
892793	2015 WX_{25}	—	November 13, 2015	Mount Lemmon	Mount Lemmon Survey	GEF	840 m	MPC · JPL
892794	2015 WG_{30}	—	November 19, 2015	Mount Lemmon	Mount Lemmon Survey	·	490 m	MPC · JPL
892795	2015 WJ_{34}	—	November 20, 2015	Mount Lemmon	Mount Lemmon Survey	·	1.7 km	MPC · JPL
892796	2015 WP_{34}	—	November 20, 2015	Mount Lemmon	Mount Lemmon Survey	NEM	1.5 km	MPC · JPL
892797	2015 WT_{35}	—	November 18, 2015	Haleakala	Pan-STARRS 1	·	1.3 km	MPC · JPL
892798	2015 WK_{40}	—	November 19, 2015	Mount Lemmon	Mount Lemmon Survey	·	1.4 km	MPC · JPL
892799	2015 WD_{41}	—	September 28, 2011	Mount Lemmon	Mount Lemmon Survey	·	840 m	MPC · JPL
892800	2015 XF_{3}	—	December 8, 2012	Mount Lemmon	Mount Lemmon Survey	·	420 m	MPC · JPL

== 892801–892900 ==
back to top

Designation			Discovery			Properties		Ref
Permanent	Provisional	Named after	Date	Site	Discoverer(s)	Category	Diam.	Ref
892801	2015 XC_{5}	—	January 19, 2012	Haleakala	Pan-STARRS 1	·	1.3 km	MPC · JPL
892802	2015 XX_{5}	—	October 21, 2015	Haleakala	Pan-STARRS 1	·	810 m	MPC · JPL
892803	2015 XJ_{7}	—	November 10, 2015	Mount Lemmon	Mount Lemmon Survey	·	820 m	MPC · JPL
892804	2015 XK_{7}	—	November 13, 2015	Mount Lemmon	Mount Lemmon Survey	·	400 m	MPC · JPL
892805	2015 XW_{13}	—	January 2, 2011	Mount Lemmon	Mount Lemmon Survey	THM	1.4 km	MPC · JPL
892806	2015 XY_{18}	—	November 7, 2015	Mount Lemmon	Mount Lemmon Survey	·	430 m	MPC · JPL
892807	2015 XX_{19}	—	February 27, 2012	Haleakala	Pan-STARRS 1	·	1.1 km	MPC · JPL
892808	2015 XU_{26}	—	January 20, 2012	Haleakala	Pan-STARRS 1	·	1.4 km	MPC · JPL
892809	2015 XH_{32}	—	June 27, 2014	Haleakala	Pan-STARRS 1	·	1.3 km	MPC · JPL
892810	2015 XD_{38}	—	October 26, 2008	Mount Lemmon	Mount Lemmon Survey	·	480 m	MPC · JPL
892811	2015 XG_{39}	—	December 2, 2015	Haleakala	Pan-STARRS 1	V	420 m	MPC · JPL
892812	2015 XW_{51}	—	October 21, 2015	Haleakala	Pan-STARRS 1	·	1.5 km	MPC · JPL
892813	2015 XG_{57}	—	December 1, 2015	Haleakala	Pan-STARRS 1	·	1.5 km	MPC · JPL
892814	2015 XX_{59}	—	December 14, 2010	Mount Lemmon	Mount Lemmon Survey	·	1.9 km	MPC · JPL
892815	2015 XG_{64}	—	November 8, 2010	Mount Lemmon	Mount Lemmon Survey	·	1.2 km	MPC · JPL
892816	2015 XY_{67}	—	November 13, 2015	Mount Lemmon	Mount Lemmon Survey	GAL	960 m	MPC · JPL
892817	2015 XV_{71}	—	December 3, 2015	Mount Lemmon	Mount Lemmon Survey	·	1.3 km	MPC · JPL
892818	2015 XG_{83}	—	December 3, 2015	Haleakala	Pan-STARRS 1	·	1.3 km	MPC · JPL
892819	2015 XM_{89}	—	July 19, 2015	Haleakala	Pan-STARRS 1	·	1.3 km	MPC · JPL
892820	2015 XA_{102}	—	October 8, 2015	Haleakala	Pan-STARRS 1	·	1.5 km	MPC · JPL
892821	2015 XV_{103}	—	September 1, 2014	Mount Lemmon	Mount Lemmon Survey	·	2.0 km	MPC · JPL
892822	2015 XW_{110}	—	July 29, 2014	Haleakala	Pan-STARRS 1	·	1.5 km	MPC · JPL
892823	2015 XP_{115}	—	December 4, 2015	Haleakala	Pan-STARRS 1	·	1.2 km	MPC · JPL
892824	2015 XH_{117}	—	October 9, 2015	Haleakala	Pan-STARRS 1	·	460 m	MPC · JPL
892825	2015 XP_{129}	—	December 4, 2015	Haleakala	Pan-STARRS 1	APO · PHA	560 m	MPC · JPL
892826	2015 XZ_{144}	—	July 25, 2014	Haleakala	Pan-STARRS 1	KOR	980 m	MPC · JPL
892827	2015 XB_{152}	—	February 19, 2012	Kitt Peak	Spacewatch	·	1.2 km	MPC · JPL
892828	2015 XB_{155}	—	December 5, 2015	Haleakala	Pan-STARRS 1	·	1.4 km	MPC · JPL
892829	2015 XA_{163}	—	September 12, 2015	Haleakala	Pan-STARRS 1	·	1.2 km	MPC · JPL
892830	2015 XY_{163}	—	November 17, 2015	Haleakala	Pan-STARRS 1	GAL	1.0 km	MPC · JPL
892831	2015 XJ_{172}	—	December 5, 2015	Mount Lemmon	Mount Lemmon Survey	·	1.6 km	MPC · JPL
892832	2015 XS_{172}	—	October 12, 2015	Haleakala	Pan-STARRS 1	·	870 m	MPC · JPL
892833	2015 XN_{179}	—	November 21, 2008	Mount Lemmon	Mount Lemmon Survey	·	480 m	MPC · JPL
892834	2015 XS_{185}	—	June 27, 2014	Haleakala	Pan-STARRS 1	T_{j} (2.96)	2.3 km	MPC · JPL
892835	2015 XG_{190}	—	December 6, 2015	Haleakala	Pan-STARRS 1	·	1.8 km	MPC · JPL
892836	2015 XZ_{190}	—	September 20, 2011	Mount Lemmon	Mount Lemmon Survey	·	620 m	MPC · JPL
892837	2015 XP_{194}	—	August 16, 2010	La Sagra	OAM	·	1.6 km	MPC · JPL
892838	2015 XE_{209}	—	November 22, 2015	Mount Lemmon	Mount Lemmon Survey	·	570 m	MPC · JPL
892839	2015 XD_{214}	—	December 3, 2015	Mount Lemmon	Mount Lemmon Survey	DOR	1.6 km	MPC · JPL
892840	2015 XT_{227}	—	December 3, 2015	Mount Lemmon	Mount Lemmon Survey	·	390 m	MPC · JPL
892841	2015 XO_{231}	—	December 6, 2015	Haleakala	Pan-STARRS 1	·	1.2 km	MPC · JPL
892842	2015 XZ_{235}	—	November 22, 2015	Mount Lemmon	Mount Lemmon Survey	·	530 m	MPC · JPL
892843	2015 XR_{241}	—	November 22, 2015	Mount Lemmon	Mount Lemmon Survey	·	500 m	MPC · JPL
892844	2015 XP_{246}	—	October 6, 2008	Mount Lemmon	Mount Lemmon Survey	·	480 m	MPC · JPL
892845	2015 XL_{253}	—	December 7, 2015	Haleakala	Pan-STARRS 1	·	2.4 km	MPC · JPL
892846	2015 XX_{260}	—	December 8, 2015	Haleakala	Pan-STARRS 1	H	390 m	MPC · JPL
892847	2015 XH_{267}	—	November 12, 2015	Mount Lemmon	Mount Lemmon Survey	·	1.5 km	MPC · JPL
892848	2015 XW_{270}	—	May 21, 2014	Haleakala	Pan-STARRS 1	·	440 m	MPC · JPL
892849	2015 XB_{289}	—	December 7, 2015	Haleakala	Pan-STARRS 1	·	1.1 km	MPC · JPL
892850	2015 XM_{289}	—	November 22, 2015	Mount Lemmon	Mount Lemmon Survey	·	2.1 km	MPC · JPL
892851	2015 XL_{296}	—	December 3, 2015	Mount Lemmon	Mount Lemmon Survey	·	470 m	MPC · JPL
892852	2015 XZ_{296}	—	December 7, 2015	Haleakala	Pan-STARRS 1	·	1.2 km	MPC · JPL
892853	2015 XU_{307}	—	December 7, 2015	Haleakala	Pan-STARRS 1	H	330 m	MPC · JPL
892854	2015 XT_{310}	—	December 8, 2015	Mount Lemmon	Mount Lemmon Survey	NYS	600 m	MPC · JPL
892855	2015 XZ_{315}	—	November 14, 2010	Catalina	CSS	·	1.2 km	MPC · JPL
892856	2015 XB_{329}	—	August 4, 2014	Haleakala	Pan-STARRS 1	THM	1.4 km	MPC · JPL
892857	2015 XA_{330}	—	December 11, 2009	Mount Lemmon	Mount Lemmon Survey	·	2.7 km	MPC · JPL
892858	2015 XG_{334}	—	December 8, 2015	Haleakala	Pan-STARRS 1	·	1.5 km	MPC · JPL
892859	2015 XF_{336}	—	December 8, 2015	Haleakala	Pan-STARRS 1	NYS	780 m	MPC · JPL
892860	2015 XW_{343}	—	February 28, 2012	Haleakala	Pan-STARRS 1	·	1.3 km	MPC · JPL
892861	2015 XY_{356}	—	October 10, 2015	Haleakala	Pan-STARRS 1	DOR	1.5 km	MPC · JPL
892862	2015 XZ_{383}	—	November 12, 2015	Mount Lemmon	Mount Lemmon Survey	·	490 m	MPC · JPL
892863	2015 XM_{387}	—	December 18, 2007	Mount Lemmon	Mount Lemmon Survey	H	320 m	MPC · JPL
892864	2015 XC_{388}	—	December 4, 2015	Haleakala	Pan-STARRS 1	H	250 m	MPC · JPL
892865	2015 XX_{388}	—	December 9, 2015	Haleakala	Pan-STARRS 1	H	360 m	MPC · JPL
892866	2015 XZ_{388}	—	December 9, 2015	Haleakala	Pan-STARRS 1	H	330 m	MPC · JPL
892867	2015 XX_{393}	—	December 13, 2015	Haleakala	Pan-STARRS 1	·	1.4 km	MPC · JPL
892868	2015 XW_{396}	—	December 14, 2015	Haleakala	Pan-STARRS 1	·	1.1 km	MPC · JPL
892869	2015 XS_{397}	—	December 3, 2015	Haleakala	Pan-STARRS 1	·	1.4 km	MPC · JPL
892870	2015 XW_{410}	—	July 30, 2014	Haleakala	Pan-STARRS 1	·	1.2 km	MPC · JPL
892871	2015 XL_{419}	—	October 25, 2011	Haleakala	Pan-STARRS 1	·	560 m	MPC · JPL
892872	2015 XU_{419}	—	December 20, 2009	Mount Lemmon	Mount Lemmon Survey	·	2.4 km	MPC · JPL
892873	2015 XB_{423}	—	December 7, 2015	Haleakala	Pan-STARRS 1	H	200 m	MPC · JPL
892874	2015 XT_{425}	—	December 7, 2015	Haleakala	Pan-STARRS 1	·	1.3 km	MPC · JPL
892875	2015 XV_{427}	—	December 9, 2015	Haleakala	Pan-STARRS 1	·	1.1 km	MPC · JPL
892876	2015 XJ_{429}	—	December 4, 2015	Mount Lemmon	Mount Lemmon Survey	PHO	760 m	MPC · JPL
892877	2015 XU_{432}	—	December 1, 2015	Haleakala	Pan-STARRS 1	·	460 m	MPC · JPL
892878	2015 XZ_{433}	—	December 14, 2015	Haleakala	Pan-STARRS 1	·	410 m	MPC · JPL
892879	2015 XS_{435}	—	December 6, 2015	Mount Lemmon	Mount Lemmon Survey	·	540 m	MPC · JPL
892880	2015 XP_{437}	—	December 1, 2015	Haleakala	Pan-STARRS 1	·	470 m	MPC · JPL
892881	2015 XX_{438}	—	December 13, 2015	Haleakala	Pan-STARRS 1	·	1.6 km	MPC · JPL
892882	2015 XD_{445}	—	December 12, 2015	Haleakala	Pan-STARRS 1	NYS	650 m	MPC · JPL
892883	2015 XD_{453}	—	July 25, 2014	Haleakala	Pan-STARRS 1	LIX	1.9 km	MPC · JPL
892884	2015 XT_{454}	—	December 14, 2015	Mount Lemmon	Mount Lemmon Survey	VER	2.0 km	MPC · JPL
892885	2015 XU_{458}	—	December 3, 2015	Mount Lemmon	Mount Lemmon Survey	·	420 m	MPC · JPL
892886	2015 XD_{462}	—	December 13, 2015	Haleakala	Pan-STARRS 1	·	1.3 km	MPC · JPL
892887	2015 XZ_{462}	—	December 4, 2015	Haleakala	Pan-STARRS 1	H	300 m	MPC · JPL
892888	2015 XK_{463}	—	December 9, 2015	Haleakala	Pan-STARRS 1	H	340 m	MPC · JPL
892889	2015 XL_{463}	—	December 9, 2015	Haleakala	Pan-STARRS 1	·	1.1 km	MPC · JPL
892890	2015 XM_{463}	—	December 13, 2015	Haleakala	Pan-STARRS 1	H	360 m	MPC · JPL
892891	2015 XY_{463}	—	December 8, 2015	Haleakala	Pan-STARRS 1	H	350 m	MPC · JPL
892892	2015 XZ_{463}	—	December 15, 2015	Ouka{\"\i}meden	C. Rinner	H	340 m	MPC · JPL
892893	2015 XB_{464}	—	December 8, 2015	Haleakala	Pan-STARRS 1	·	1.5 km	MPC · JPL
892894	2015 XQ_{464}	—	December 4, 2015	Haleakala	Pan-STARRS 1	·	1.5 km	MPC · JPL
892895	2015 XB_{469}	—	December 8, 2015	Mount Lemmon	Mount Lemmon Survey	·	1.2 km	MPC · JPL
892896	2015 XW_{470}	—	December 7, 2015	Haleakala	Pan-STARRS 1	·	1.2 km	MPC · JPL
892897	2015 XP_{472}	—	December 14, 2015	Haleakala	Pan-STARRS 1	NYS	710 m	MPC · JPL
892898	2015 XG_{483}	—	December 13, 2015	Haleakala	Pan-STARRS 1	·	2.3 km	MPC · JPL
892899	2015 XM_{485}	—	December 8, 2015	Mount Lemmon	Mount Lemmon Survey	615	1.0 km	MPC · JPL
892900	2015 XH_{489}	—	December 8, 2015	Haleakala	Pan-STARRS 1	·	400 m	MPC · JPL

== 892901–893000 ==
back to top

Designation			Discovery			Properties		Ref
Permanent	Provisional	Named after	Date	Site	Discoverer(s)	Category	Diam.	Ref
892901	2015 XS_{491}	—	December 12, 2015	Haleakala	Pan-STARRS 1	·	440 m	MPC · JPL
892902	2015 XL_{515}	—	December 14, 2015	Haleakala	Pan-STARRS 1	·	1.1 km	MPC · JPL
892903	2015 YZ_{2}	—	December 29, 2008	Mount Lemmon	Mount Lemmon Survey	NYS	730 m	MPC · JPL
892904	2015 YL_{21}	—	December 6, 2010	Mount Lemmon	Mount Lemmon Survey	H	430 m	MPC · JPL
892905	2015 YQ_{34}	—	December 19, 2015	Mount Lemmon	Mount Lemmon Survey	EOS	1.3 km	MPC · JPL
892906	2015 YJ_{35}	—	December 18, 2015	Mount Lemmon	Mount Lemmon Survey	BRA	960 m	MPC · JPL
892907	2015 YG_{36}	—	December 18, 2015	Kitt Peak	Spacewatch	·	2.0 km	MPC · JPL
892908	2015 BK_{624}	—	January 17, 2015	Haleakala	Pan-STARRS 1	·	2.1 km	MPC · JPL
892909	2015 BP_{633}	—	January 21, 2015	Haleakala	Pan-STARRS 1	·	1.8 km	MPC · JPL
892910	2015 BD_{634}	—	January 22, 2015	Haleakala	Pan-STARRS 1	·	710 m	MPC · JPL
892911	2015 BF_{634}	—	January 26, 2015	Haleakala	Pan-STARRS 1	·	760 m	MPC · JPL
892912	2015 BS_{639}	—	January 18, 2015	Kitt Peak	Spacewatch	·	2.0 km	MPC · JPL
892913	2016 AQ_{4}	—	November 26, 2005	Kitt Peak	Spacewatch	·	410 m	MPC · JPL
892914	2016 AQ_{12}	—	March 6, 2013	Haleakala	Pan-STARRS 1	·	490 m	MPC · JPL
892915	2016 AV_{17}	—	December 3, 2015	Mount Lemmon	Mount Lemmon Survey	·	1.7 km	MPC · JPL
892916	2016 AD_{20}	—	January 3, 2016	Mount Lemmon	Mount Lemmon Survey	·	1.4 km	MPC · JPL
892917	2016 AG_{23}	—	January 3, 2016	Haleakala	Pan-STARRS 1	·	460 m	MPC · JPL
892918	2016 AS_{31}	—	January 30, 2011	Mount Lemmon	Mount Lemmon Survey	·	1.9 km	MPC · JPL
892919	2016 AM_{36}	—	December 8, 2015	Haleakala	Pan-STARRS 1	H	350 m	MPC · JPL
892920	2016 AU_{47}	—	August 20, 2014	Haleakala	Pan-STARRS 1	·	1.3 km	MPC · JPL
892921	2016 AW_{52}	—	December 6, 2010	Kitt Peak	Spacewatch	·	1.3 km	MPC · JPL
892922	2016 AR_{64}	—	December 2, 2005	Kitt Peak	Spacewatch	·	1.4 km	MPC · JPL
892923	2016 AG_{67}	—	January 4, 2011	Mount Lemmon	Mount Lemmon Survey	·	1.1 km	MPC · JPL
892924	2016 AD_{70}	—	January 28, 2007	Mount Lemmon	Mount Lemmon Survey	·	1.4 km	MPC · JPL
892925	2016 AM_{78}	—	December 3, 2010	Mount Lemmon	Mount Lemmon Survey	·	1.4 km	MPC · JPL
892926	2016 AA_{96}	—	March 19, 2013	Haleakala	Pan-STARRS 1	·	400 m	MPC · JPL
892927	2016 AC_{99}	—	January 7, 2016	Haleakala	Pan-STARRS 1	H	250 m	MPC · JPL
892928	2016 AF_{100}	—	January 7, 2016	Haleakala	Pan-STARRS 1	·	550 m	MPC · JPL
892929	2016 AL_{101}	—	January 7, 2016	Haleakala	Pan-STARRS 1	·	460 m	MPC · JPL
892930	2016 AU_{102}	—	January 7, 2016	Haleakala	Pan-STARRS 1	GEF	1 km	MPC · JPL
892931	2016 AQ_{111}	—	January 7, 2016	Haleakala	Pan-STARRS 1	PHO	650 m	MPC · JPL
892932	2016 AJ_{112}	—	November 16, 2009	Mount Lemmon	Mount Lemmon Survey	·	1.8 km	MPC · JPL
892933	2016 AN_{140}	—	January 9, 2016	Haleakala	Pan-STARRS 1	·	1.7 km	MPC · JPL
892934	2016 AC_{142}	—	January 9, 2016	Haleakala	Pan-STARRS 1	H	330 m	MPC · JPL
892935	2016 AY_{145}	—	February 2, 2006	Kitt Peak	Spacewatch	·	1.4 km	MPC · JPL
892936	2016 AJ_{158}	—	December 12, 2015	Haleakala	Pan-STARRS 1	·	1.9 km	MPC · JPL
892937	2016 AQ_{158}	—	December 12, 2015	Haleakala	Pan-STARRS 1	H	330 m	MPC · JPL
892938	2016 AT_{160}	—	August 31, 2014	Haleakala	Pan-STARRS 1	·	1.2 km	MPC · JPL
892939	2016 AL_{179}	—	December 13, 2015	Haleakala	Pan-STARRS 1	·	1.8 km	MPC · JPL
892940	2016 AJ_{181}	—	January 11, 2016	Haleakala	Pan-STARRS 1	H	270 m	MPC · JPL
892941	2016 AQ_{191}	—	January 9, 2016	Haleakala	Pan-STARRS 1	H	280 m	MPC · JPL
892942	2016 AO_{196}	—	June 26, 2014	Mount Lemmon	Mount Lemmon Survey	H	400 m	MPC · JPL
892943	2016 AN_{197}	—	January 12, 2016	Haleakala	Pan-STARRS 1	H	300 m	MPC · JPL
892944	2016 AC_{198}	—	January 15, 2016	Haleakala	Pan-STARRS 1	H	300 m	MPC · JPL
892945	2016 AN_{198}	—	January 27, 2011	Mount Lemmon	Mount Lemmon Survey	H	330 m	MPC · JPL
892946	2016 AX_{198}	—	January 8, 2016	Haleakala	Pan-STARRS 1	H	460 m	MPC · JPL
892947	2016 AE_{201}	—	January 3, 2016	Haleakala	Pan-STARRS 1	·	460 m	MPC · JPL
892948	2016 AY_{201}	—	January 3, 2016	Haleakala	Pan-STARRS 1	·	790 m	MPC · JPL
892949	2016 AY_{203}	—	January 4, 2016	Haleakala	Pan-STARRS 1	·	820 m	MPC · JPL
892950	2016 AK_{204}	—	January 4, 2016	Haleakala	Pan-STARRS 1	BRA	890 m	MPC · JPL
892951	2016 AO_{204}	—	January 4, 2016	Haleakala	Pan-STARRS 1	·	1.5 km	MPC · JPL
892952	2016 AD_{211}	—	January 9, 2016	Haleakala	Pan-STARRS 1	·	1.6 km	MPC · JPL
892953	2016 AT_{212}	—	January 13, 2016	Haleakala	Pan-STARRS 1	·	1.2 km	MPC · JPL
892954	2016 AB_{240}	—	January 2, 2016	Haleakala	Pan-STARRS 1	·	1.8 km	MPC · JPL
892955	2016 AL_{246}	—	January 3, 2016	Haleakala	Pan-STARRS 1	·	1.3 km	MPC · JPL
892956	2016 AC_{252}	—	March 14, 2011	Mount Lemmon	Mount Lemmon Survey	·	1.5 km	MPC · JPL
892957	2016 AK_{254}	—	August 28, 2014	Haleakala	Pan-STARRS 1	LIX	2.0 km	MPC · JPL
892958	2016 AR_{275}	—	January 14, 2011	Kitt Peak	Spacewatch	·	1.5 km	MPC · JPL
892959	2016 AA_{280}	—	January 4, 2016	Haleakala	Pan-STARRS 1	·	510 m	MPC · JPL
892960	2016 AO_{281}	—	January 11, 2016	Haleakala	Pan-STARRS 1	H	290 m	MPC · JPL
892961	2016 AT_{291}	—	November 24, 2008	Kitt Peak	Spacewatch	·	400 m	MPC · JPL
892962	2016 AJ_{292}	—	January 4, 2016	Haleakala	Pan-STARRS 1	·	430 m	MPC · JPL
892963	2016 AX_{293}	—	January 7, 2016	Haleakala	Pan-STARRS 1	·	420 m	MPC · JPL
892964	2016 AY_{295}	—	January 9, 2016	Haleakala	Pan-STARRS 1	H	310 m	MPC · JPL
892965	2016 AY_{296}	—	January 1, 2016	Mount Lemmon	Mount Lemmon Survey	·	1.4 km	MPC · JPL
892966	2016 AE_{297}	—	January 2, 2016	Mount Lemmon	Mount Lemmon Survey	·	440 m	MPC · JPL
892967	2016 AR_{297}	—	January 13, 2016	Mount Lemmon	Mount Lemmon Survey	·	1.2 km	MPC · JPL
892968	2016 AV_{297}	—	January 7, 2016	Haleakala	Pan-STARRS 1	·	1.2 km	MPC · JPL
892969	2016 AX_{297}	—	January 4, 2016	Haleakala	Pan-STARRS 1	·	850 m	MPC · JPL
892970	2016 AM_{299}	—	January 7, 2016	Haleakala	Pan-STARRS 1	·	1.7 km	MPC · JPL
892971	2016 AE_{300}	—	January 14, 2016	Haleakala	Pan-STARRS 1	·	590 m	MPC · JPL
892972	2016 AL_{300}	—	January 4, 2016	Haleakala	Pan-STARRS 1	·	860 m	MPC · JPL
892973	2016 AV_{300}	—	January 13, 2016	Haleakala	Pan-STARRS 1	·	1.2 km	MPC · JPL
892974	2016 AA_{301}	—	January 4, 2016	Haleakala	Pan-STARRS 1	·	620 m	MPC · JPL
892975	2016 AF_{302}	—	January 8, 2016	Haleakala	Pan-STARRS 1	·	1.8 km	MPC · JPL
892976	2016 AF_{304}	—	January 14, 2016	Haleakala	Pan-STARRS 1	·	1.6 km	MPC · JPL
892977	2016 AG_{304}	—	January 15, 2016	Haleakala	Pan-STARRS 1	·	600 m	MPC · JPL
892978	2016 AM_{311}	—	January 3, 2016	Haleakala	Pan-STARRS 1	·	720 m	MPC · JPL
892979	2016 AF_{313}	—	January 14, 2016	Haleakala	Pan-STARRS 1	EOS	990 m	MPC · JPL
892980	2016 AU_{315}	—	January 2, 2016	Haleakala	Pan-STARRS 1	·	500 m	MPC · JPL
892981	2016 AK_{316}	—	January 7, 2016	Haleakala	Pan-STARRS 1	·	820 m	MPC · JPL
892982	2016 AZ_{318}	—	January 8, 2016	Haleakala	Pan-STARRS 1	TIR	1.8 km	MPC · JPL
892983	2016 AL_{322}	—	January 11, 2016	Haleakala	Pan-STARRS 1	·	490 m	MPC · JPL
892984	2016 AW_{323}	—	January 15, 2016	Mount Lemmon	Mount Lemmon Survey	HNS	680 m	MPC · JPL
892985	2016 AT_{326}	—	January 12, 2016	Haleakala	Pan-STARRS 1	·	1.5 km	MPC · JPL
892986	2016 AM_{328}	—	January 9, 2016	Haleakala	Pan-STARRS 1	H	280 m	MPC · JPL
892987	2016 AA_{329}	—	January 2, 2016	Mount Lemmon	Mount Lemmon Survey	·	1.4 km	MPC · JPL
892988	2016 AA_{334}	—	January 14, 2016	Haleakala	Pan-STARRS 1	H	220 m	MPC · JPL
892989	2016 AJ_{334}	—	January 1, 2016	Haleakala	Pan-STARRS 1	·	1.8 km	MPC · JPL
892990	2016 AK_{337}	—	January 4, 2016	Haleakala	Pan-STARRS 1	·	1.2 km	MPC · JPL
892991	2016 AS_{337}	—	January 8, 2016	Haleakala	Pan-STARRS 1	·	1.3 km	MPC · JPL
892992	2016 AS_{338}	—	January 4, 2016	Haleakala	Pan-STARRS 1	·	1.5 km	MPC · JPL
892993	2016 AM_{339}	—	January 1, 2016	Haleakala	Pan-STARRS 1	·	1.2 km	MPC · JPL
892994	2016 AR_{339}	—	January 10, 2016	Haleakala	Pan-STARRS 1	·	1.4 km	MPC · JPL
892995	2016 AL_{342}	—	January 11, 2016	Haleakala	Pan-STARRS 1	·	1.3 km	MPC · JPL
892996	2016 AG_{345}	—	January 4, 2016	Haleakala	Pan-STARRS 1	·	2.2 km	MPC · JPL
892997	2016 AS_{345}	—	January 4, 2016	Haleakala	Pan-STARRS 1	KOR	940 m	MPC · JPL
892998	2016 AO_{346}	—	January 4, 2016	Haleakala	Pan-STARRS 1	·	2.0 km	MPC · JPL
892999	2016 AR_{346}	—	January 4, 2016	Haleakala	Pan-STARRS 1	·	1.2 km	MPC · JPL
893000	2016 AF_{348}	—	October 24, 2011	Haleakala	Pan-STARRS 1	·	700 m	MPC · JPL

back to top

== See also ==
- Meanings of minor-planet names: 892001–893000
