= Meanings of minor-planet names: 357001–358000 =

As minor planet discoveries are confirmed, they are given a permanent number by the IAU's Minor Planet Center (MPC), and the discoverers can then submit names for them, following the IAU's naming conventions. The list below concerns those minor planets in the specified number-range that have received names, and explains the meanings of those names.

Official naming citations of newly named small Solar System bodies are approved and published in a bulletin by IAU's Working Group for Small Bodies Nomenclature (WGSBN). Before May 2021, citations were published in MPC's Minor Planet Circulars for many decades. Recent citations can also be found on the JPL Small-Body Database (SBDB). Until his death in 2016, German astronomer Lutz D. Schmadel compiled these citations into the Dictionary of Minor Planet Names (DMP) and regularly updated the collection.

Based on Paul Herget's The Names of the Minor Planets, Schmadel also researched the unclear origin of numerous asteroids, most of which had been named prior to World War II. This article incorporates text from this source, which is in the public domain: SBDB New namings may only be added to this list below after official publication as the preannouncement of names is condemned. The WGSBN publishes a comprehensive guideline for the naming rules of non-cometary small Solar System bodies.

== 357001–357100 ==
Named minor planet	Provisional	This minor planet was named for...	Ref · Catalog
There are no named minor planets in this number range

== 357101–357200 ==
back to top

Named minor planet	Provisional	This minor planet was named for...	Ref · Catalog
357106 Pacholka	2001 TW_{257}	Wally Pacholka (born 1949), Canadian-American photographer who has won Picture of the Year awards from Time and Life magazines; more than 50 of his pictures have been selected as Astronomy Picture of the Day	IAU · 357106
357116 Attivissimo	2001 WH	Paolo Attivissimo (born 1963), an Italian writer, blogger and journalist	JPL · 357116
357148 El-Maarry	2002 CZ	Mohamed Ramy El-Maarry (born 1981), Egyptian planetary scientist, director of the Space and Planetary Science Center at Khalifa University	IAU · 357148

== 357201–357300 ==
back to top

Named minor planet	Provisional	This minor planet was named for...	Ref · Catalog
357243 Jefferies	2002 OQ_{37}	John T. Jefferies (b. 1925), an Australian-American solar physicist.	IAU · 357243

== 357301–357400 ==
back to top

Named minor planet	Provisional	This minor planet was named for...	Ref · Catalog
There are no named minor planets in this number range

== 357401–357500 ==
back to top

Named minor planet	Provisional	This minor planet was named for...	Ref · Catalog
There are no named minor planets in this number range

== 357501–357600 ==
back to top

Named minor planet	Provisional	This minor planet was named for...	Ref · Catalog
357546 Edwardhalbach	2004 RA_{339}	Edward A. Halbach (1909–2011), a prominent amateur astronomer.	JPL · 357546

== 357601–357700 ==
back to top

Named minor planet	Provisional	This minor planet was named for...	Ref · Catalog
There are no named minor planets in this number range

== 357701–357800 ==
back to top

Named minor planet	Provisional	This minor planet was named for...	Ref · Catalog
There are no named minor planets in this number range

== 357801–357900 ==
back to top

Named minor planet	Provisional	This minor planet was named for...	Ref · Catalog
There are no named minor planets in this number range

== 357901–358000 ==
back to top

Named minor planet	Provisional	This minor planet was named for...	Ref · Catalog
There are no named minor planets in this number range

back to top

Preceded by 356,001–357,000	Meanings of minor-planet names List of minor planets: 357,001–358,000	Succeeded by 358,001–359,000
