= List of minor planets: 357001–358000 =

The following is a partial list of minor planets, running from minor-planet number 357001 through 358000, inclusive. The primary data for this and other partial lists is based on JPL's "Small-Body Orbital Elements" and data available from the Minor Planet Center. Critical list information is also provided by the MPC, unless otherwise specified from Lowell Observatory. A detailed description of the table's columns and additional sources are given on the main page including a complete list of every page in this series, and a statistical break-up on the dynamical classification of minor planets.

Also see the summary list of all named bodies in numerical and alphabetical order, and the corresponding naming citations for the number range of this particular list. New namings may only be added to this list after official publication, as the preannouncement of names is condemned by the Working Group for Small Bodies Nomenclature of the International Astronomical Union.

Near-Earth obj.	MBA (inner)	MBA (outer)	Centaur
Mars-crosser	MBA (middle)	Jupiter trojan	Trans-Neptunian obj.
Unclassified

== 357001–357100 ==
Designation			Discovery			Properties		Ref
Permanent	Provisional	Named after	Date	Site	Discoverer(s)	Category	Diam.	Ref
357001	1998 UK_{14}	—	October 23, 1998	Kitt Peak	Spacewatch	·	1.4 km	MPC · JPL
357002	1999 BS_{28}	—	January 10, 1999	Kitt Peak	Spacewatch	HOF	2.9 km	MPC · JPL
357003	1999 CX_{142}	—	January 8, 1999	Kitt Peak	Spacewatch	·	1.8 km	MPC · JPL
357004	1999 FU_{12}	—	March 18, 1999	Kitt Peak	Spacewatch	V	780 m	MPC · JPL
357005	1999 HA_{2}	—	April 20, 1999	Socorro	LINEAR	T_{j} (2.88) · APO +1km · critical	900 m	MPC · JPL
357006	1999 RW_{236}	—	September 8, 1999	Catalina	CSS	·	1.4 km	MPC · JPL
357007	1999 TH_{61}	—	October 7, 1999	Kitt Peak	Spacewatch	·	3.4 km	MPC · JPL
357008	1999 TJ_{74}	—	October 10, 1999	Kitt Peak	Spacewatch	·	3.3 km	MPC · JPL
357009	1999 TG_{122}	—	October 4, 1999	Socorro	LINEAR	·	1.2 km	MPC · JPL
357010	1999 TS_{161}	—	October 9, 1999	Socorro	LINEAR	·	1.3 km	MPC · JPL
357011	1999 UB_{30}	—	October 16, 1999	Kitt Peak	Spacewatch	·	3.4 km	MPC · JPL
357012	1999 VS_{13}	—	November 2, 1999	Socorro	LINEAR	·	2.0 km	MPC · JPL
357013	1999 VL_{89}	—	November 5, 1999	Socorro	LINEAR	·	1.5 km	MPC · JPL
357014	1999 VB_{93}	—	November 9, 1999	Socorro	LINEAR	·	1.2 km	MPC · JPL
357015	1999 VH_{117}	—	November 9, 1999	Kitt Peak	Spacewatch	·	3.8 km	MPC · JPL
357016	1999 VR_{130}	—	November 9, 1999	Kitt Peak	Spacewatch	V	790 m	MPC · JPL
357017	1999 VK_{136}	—	October 14, 1999	Kitt Peak	Spacewatch	·	1.4 km	MPC · JPL
357018	1999 VK_{163}	—	November 14, 1999	Socorro	LINEAR	·	2.3 km	MPC · JPL
357019	1999 WH_{16}	—	November 29, 1999	Kitt Peak	Spacewatch	(5)	930 m	MPC · JPL
357020	1999 XU_{30}	—	December 6, 1999	Socorro	LINEAR	·	1.7 km	MPC · JPL
357021	1999 XT_{224}	—	December 13, 1999	Kitt Peak	Spacewatch	EUN	1.3 km	MPC · JPL
357022	1999 YG_{3}	—	December 20, 1999	Socorro	LINEAR	APO · PHA	430 m	MPC · JPL
357023	1999 YZ_{3}	—	December 19, 1999	Socorro	LINEAR	·	2.1 km	MPC · JPL
357024	1999 YR_{14}	—	December 31, 1999	Anderson Mesa	LONEOS	APO · PHA	260 m	MPC · JPL
357025	2000 DR_{59}	—	February 29, 2000	Socorro	LINEAR	·	1.7 km	MPC · JPL
357026	2000 DV_{82}	—	February 28, 2000	Socorro	LINEAR	(5)	1.9 km	MPC · JPL
357027	2000 EU_{9}	—	March 3, 2000	Socorro	LINEAR	·	1.7 km	MPC · JPL
357028	2000 EJ_{26}	—	March 4, 2000	Socorro	LINEAR	APO · PHA	460 m	MPC · JPL
357029	2000 EK_{131}	—	March 11, 2000	Socorro	LINEAR	H	600 m	MPC · JPL
357030	2000 EX_{152}	—	March 6, 2000	Haleakala	NEAT	·	1.7 km	MPC · JPL
357031	2000 FG_{6}	—	March 25, 2000	Kitt Peak	Spacewatch	·	1.8 km	MPC · JPL
357032	2000 HT_{18}	—	April 25, 2000	Kitt Peak	Spacewatch	·	1.9 km	MPC · JPL
357033	2000 HN_{47}	—	April 29, 2000	Socorro	LINEAR	ADE	3.3 km	MPC · JPL
357034	2000 KR_{66}	—	May 28, 2000	Anderson Mesa	LONEOS	H	840 m	MPC · JPL
357035	2000 LD_{15}	—	June 8, 2000	Kitt Peak	Spacewatch	·	790 m	MPC · JPL
357036	2000 LL_{22}	—	June 6, 2000	Kitt Peak	Spacewatch	·	1.8 km	MPC · JPL
357037	2000 NU_{23}	—	July 5, 2000	Anderson Mesa	LONEOS	·	1.4 km	MPC · JPL
357038	2000 QH_{13}	—	August 24, 2000	Socorro	LINEAR	·	1.1 km	MPC · JPL
357039	2000 QS_{70}	—	August 29, 2000	Socorro	LINEAR	H	810 m	MPC · JPL
357040	2000 QK_{87}	—	August 25, 2000	Socorro	LINEAR	·	1.6 km	MPC · JPL
357041	2000 QH_{175}	—	August 31, 2000	Socorro	LINEAR	·	950 m	MPC · JPL
357042	2000 RB_{25}	—	September 1, 2000	Socorro	LINEAR	·	970 m	MPC · JPL
357043	2000 RE_{90}	—	September 3, 2000	Socorro	LINEAR	·	1.1 km	MPC · JPL
357044	2000 SS_{33}	—	September 24, 2000	Socorro	LINEAR	·	1.2 km	MPC · JPL
357045	2000 SG_{58}	—	September 24, 2000	Socorro	LINEAR	·	940 m	MPC · JPL
357046	2000 SW_{79}	—	September 24, 2000	Socorro	LINEAR	·	850 m	MPC · JPL
357047	2000 SH_{180}	—	September 28, 2000	Socorro	LINEAR	·	2.6 km	MPC · JPL
357048	2000 SC_{193}	—	September 24, 2000	Socorro	LINEAR	·	1.3 km	MPC · JPL
357049	2000 SO_{248}	—	September 24, 2000	Socorro	LINEAR	V	790 m	MPC · JPL
357050	2000 UJ_{13}	—	October 22, 2000	Ondřejov	P. Kušnirák	·	2.8 km	MPC · JPL
357051	2000 WW_{10}	—	November 22, 2000	Kitt Peak	Spacewatch	·	1.8 km	MPC · JPL
357052	2000 WV_{17}	—	November 21, 2000	Socorro	LINEAR	·	1.3 km	MPC · JPL
357053	2000 WF_{36}	—	November 20, 2000	Socorro	LINEAR	·	2.0 km	MPC · JPL
357054	2000 WV_{155}	—	November 30, 2000	Socorro	LINEAR	·	1.6 km	MPC · JPL
357055	2000 YJ_{73}	—	December 30, 2000	Socorro	LINEAR	PHO	1.3 km	MPC · JPL
357056	2001 MN_{16}	—	June 27, 2001	Palomar	NEAT	·	2.0 km	MPC · JPL
357057	2001 MR_{28}	—	June 26, 2001	Palomar	NEAT	·	2.0 km	MPC · JPL
357058	2001 OG_{25}	—	July 23, 2001	Palomar	NEAT	AMO	330 m	MPC · JPL
357059	2001 OJ_{37}	—	July 20, 2001	Palomar	NEAT	·	2.3 km	MPC · JPL
357060	2001 OC_{99}	—	July 27, 2001	Anderson Mesa	LONEOS	·	1.4 km	MPC · JPL
357061	2001 PH_{44}	—	August 15, 2001	Haleakala	NEAT	·	880 m	MPC · JPL
357062	2001 PE_{55}	—	August 14, 2001	Haleakala	NEAT	·	790 m	MPC · JPL
357063	2001 PO_{59}	—	August 14, 2001	Haleakala	NEAT	·	840 m	MPC · JPL
357064	2001 QY_{32}	—	August 17, 2001	Palomar	NEAT	H	600 m	MPC · JPL
357065	2001 QS_{33}	—	August 17, 2001	Socorro	LINEAR	·	1.6 km	MPC · JPL
357066	2001 QK_{46}	—	August 16, 2001	Socorro	LINEAR	·	2.5 km	MPC · JPL
357067	2001 QN_{69}	—	August 17, 2001	Socorro	LINEAR	·	3.6 km	MPC · JPL
357068	2001 QY_{89}	—	August 16, 2001	Palomar	NEAT	·	2.2 km	MPC · JPL
357069	2001 QX_{150}	—	August 23, 2001	Socorro	LINEAR	H	750 m	MPC · JPL
357070	2001 QH_{172}	—	August 14, 2001	Bergisch Gladbach	W. Bickel	·	660 m	MPC · JPL
357071	2001 QC_{240}	—	August 24, 2001	Socorro	LINEAR	·	2.1 km	MPC · JPL
357072	2001 RG_{11}	—	September 10, 2001	Desert Eagle	W. K. Y. Yeung	·	950 m	MPC · JPL
357073	2001 RK_{20}	—	September 7, 2001	Socorro	LINEAR	EUN	1.4 km	MPC · JPL
357074	2001 RA_{43}	—	September 7, 2001	Palomar	NEAT	·	1.9 km	MPC · JPL
357075	2001 RQ_{53}	—	September 12, 2001	Socorro	LINEAR	·	2.0 km	MPC · JPL
357076	2001 RU_{84}	—	September 11, 2001	Anderson Mesa	LONEOS	·	680 m	MPC · JPL
357077	2001 RL_{110}	—	September 12, 2001	Socorro	LINEAR	·	2.7 km	MPC · JPL
357078	2001 RL_{117}	—	September 12, 2001	Socorro	LINEAR	(13314)	1.9 km	MPC · JPL
357079	2001 RS_{138}	—	September 12, 2001	Socorro	LINEAR	·	1.8 km	MPC · JPL
357080	2001 SE_{6}	—	September 18, 2001	Kitt Peak	Spacewatch	NEM	1.9 km	MPC · JPL
357081	2001 SG_{37}	—	September 16, 2001	Socorro	LINEAR	H	610 m	MPC · JPL
357082	2001 SB_{41}	—	September 16, 2001	Socorro	LINEAR	·	840 m	MPC · JPL
357083	2001 SH_{56}	—	September 16, 2001	Socorro	LINEAR	·	2.9 km	MPC · JPL
357084	2001 SO_{174}	—	September 16, 2001	Socorro	LINEAR	·	2.2 km	MPC · JPL
357085	2001 SM_{207}	—	September 19, 2001	Socorro	LINEAR	·	590 m	MPC · JPL
357086	2001 SA_{228}	—	September 19, 2001	Socorro	LINEAR	·	2.4 km	MPC · JPL
357087	2001 SN_{237}	—	September 19, 2001	Socorro	LINEAR	·	2.4 km	MPC · JPL
357088	2001 SQ_{253}	—	September 19, 2001	Socorro	LINEAR	·	2.1 km	MPC · JPL
357089	2001 SX_{273}	—	September 19, 2001	Kitt Peak	Spacewatch	·	2.0 km	MPC · JPL
357090	2001 SF_{299}	—	August 25, 2001	Kitt Peak	Spacewatch	·	2.1 km	MPC · JPL
357091	2001 ST_{299}	—	September 20, 2001	Socorro	LINEAR	AGN	1.1 km	MPC · JPL
357092	2001 SG_{320}	—	September 21, 2001	Socorro	LINEAR	·	830 m	MPC · JPL
357093	2001 SD_{356}	—	September 30, 2006	Mount Lemmon	Mount Lemmon Survey	·	2.2 km	MPC · JPL
357094	2001 TM	—	August 19, 2001	Socorro	LINEAR	·	880 m	MPC · JPL
357095	2001 TD_{13}	—	October 13, 2001	Socorro	LINEAR	H	630 m	MPC · JPL
357096	2001 TR_{18}	—	October 15, 2001	Emerald Lane	L. Ball	·	640 m	MPC · JPL
357097	2001 TL_{85}	—	October 14, 2001	Socorro	LINEAR	·	830 m	MPC · JPL
357098	2001 TN_{111}	—	September 20, 2001	Socorro	LINEAR	·	820 m	MPC · JPL
357099	2001 TG_{135}	—	October 13, 2001	Palomar	NEAT	·	780 m	MPC · JPL
357100	2001 TM_{143}	—	October 10, 2001	Palomar	NEAT	·	2.2 km	MPC · JPL

== 357101–357200 ==
back to top

Designation			Discovery			Properties		Ref
Permanent	Provisional	Named after	Date	Site	Discoverer(s)	Category	Diam.	Ref
357101	2001 TK_{156}	—	October 14, 2001	Kitt Peak	Spacewatch	·	630 m	MPC · JPL
357102	2001 TR_{171}	—	October 15, 2001	Palomar	NEAT	·	2.9 km	MPC · JPL
357103	2001 TP_{208}	—	October 11, 2001	Palomar	NEAT	·	620 m	MPC · JPL
357104	2001 TX_{213}	—	October 13, 2001	Palomar	NEAT	·	760 m	MPC · JPL
357105	2001 TS_{224}	—	October 14, 2001	Palomar	NEAT	·	1.7 km	MPC · JPL
357106 Pacholka	2001 TW_{257}	Pacholka	October 10, 2001	Palomar	NEAT	·	2.6 km	MPC · JPL
357107	2001 UG_{8}	—	October 17, 2001	Socorro	LINEAR	·	1.0 km	MPC · JPL
357108	2001 UQ_{77}	—	October 17, 2001	Socorro	LINEAR	·	880 m	MPC · JPL
357109	2001 UN_{86}	—	October 17, 2001	Kitt Peak	Spacewatch	·	710 m	MPC · JPL
357110	2001 UE_{99}	—	October 17, 2001	Socorro	LINEAR	·	2.6 km	MPC · JPL
357111	2001 UK_{129}	—	October 20, 2001	Socorro	LINEAR	BAP	830 m	MPC · JPL
357112	2001 VB_{9}	—	November 9, 2001	Socorro	LINEAR	·	790 m	MPC · JPL
357113	2001 VY_{22}	—	November 9, 2001	Socorro	LINEAR	·	920 m	MPC · JPL
357114	2001 VA_{85}	—	November 12, 2001	Socorro	LINEAR	·	2.6 km	MPC · JPL
357115	2001 VT_{109}	—	October 26, 2001	Palomar	NEAT	·	700 m	MPC · JPL
357116 Attivissimo	2001 WH	Attivissimo	November 16, 2001	Cavezzo	Cavezzo	·	1.7 km	MPC · JPL
357117	2001 WG_{23}	—	November 27, 2001	Socorro	LINEAR	T_{j} (2.91)	2.8 km	MPC · JPL
357118	2001 WU_{60}	—	November 19, 2001	Socorro	LINEAR	·	2.5 km	MPC · JPL
357119	2001 WC_{73}	—	November 20, 2001	Socorro	LINEAR	·	660 m	MPC · JPL
357120	2001 WU_{99}	—	November 20, 2001	Socorro	LINEAR	·	640 m	MPC · JPL
357121	2001 XK_{4}	—	December 10, 2001	Socorro	LINEAR	H	680 m	MPC · JPL
357122	2001 XM_{95}	—	December 10, 2001	Socorro	LINEAR	·	1.1 km	MPC · JPL
357123	2001 XR_{216}	—	December 14, 2001	Socorro	LINEAR	(2076)	1.0 km	MPC · JPL
357124	2001 XM_{236}	—	December 15, 2001	Socorro	LINEAR	·	910 m	MPC · JPL
357125	2001 XL_{244}	—	December 15, 2001	Socorro	LINEAR	·	770 m	MPC · JPL
357126	2001 XR_{246}	—	November 19, 2001	Socorro	LINEAR	·	920 m	MPC · JPL
357127	2001 XM_{248}	—	December 14, 2001	Kitt Peak	Spacewatch	·	2.2 km	MPC · JPL
357128	2001 XP_{262}	—	December 13, 2001	Palomar	NEAT	·	690 m	MPC · JPL
357129	2001 XU_{266}	—	December 9, 2001	Mauna Kea	D. J. Tholen	·	940 m	MPC · JPL
357130	2001 YL_{66}	—	December 18, 2001	Socorro	LINEAR	·	990 m	MPC · JPL
357131	2001 YC_{152}	—	December 19, 2001	Palomar	NEAT	·	2.6 km	MPC · JPL
357132	2002 AQ_{21}	—	January 9, 2002	Socorro	LINEAR	H	680 m	MPC · JPL
357133	2002 AU_{103}	—	December 17, 2001	Socorro	LINEAR	·	1.0 km	MPC · JPL
357134	2002 AD_{105}	—	January 9, 2002	Socorro	LINEAR	NYS	910 m	MPC · JPL
357135	2002 AJ_{120}	—	January 9, 2002	Socorro	LINEAR	·	1.4 km	MPC · JPL
357136	2002 AC_{130}	—	January 15, 2002	Kingsnake	J. V. McClusky	PHO	1.2 km	MPC · JPL
357137	2002 AP_{133}	—	January 9, 2002	Socorro	LINEAR	PHO	930 m	MPC · JPL
357138	2002 AU_{145}	—	January 13, 2002	Socorro	LINEAR	·	1.9 km	MPC · JPL
357139	2002 AP_{149}	—	January 14, 2002	Socorro	LINEAR	·	2.5 km	MPC · JPL
357140	2002 AH_{162}	—	January 13, 2002	Socorro	LINEAR	·	3.8 km	MPC · JPL
357141	2002 AP_{179}	—	January 14, 2002	Socorro	LINEAR	·	1.3 km	MPC · JPL
357142	2002 AE_{193}	—	January 12, 2002	Kitt Peak	Spacewatch	·	780 m	MPC · JPL
357143	2002 AV_{203}	—	January 13, 2002	Kitt Peak	Spacewatch	V	730 m	MPC · JPL
357144	2002 AF_{209}	—	January 8, 2002	Palomar	NEAT	·	2.2 km	MPC · JPL
357145	2002 AR_{209}	—	January 14, 2002	Kitt Peak	Spacewatch	·	870 m	MPC · JPL
357146	2002 BU_{12}	—	January 21, 2002	Kitt Peak	Spacewatch	·	1.1 km	MPC · JPL
357147	2002 CS	—	February 2, 2002	Cima Ekar	ADAS	H	520 m	MPC · JPL
357148 El-Maarry	2002 CZ	El-Maarry	February 2, 2002	Cima Ekar	ADAS	V	830 m	MPC · JPL
357149	2002 CB_{3}	—	February 3, 2002	Palomar	NEAT	·	1.1 km	MPC · JPL
357150	2002 CW_{6}	—	February 1, 2002	Socorro	LINEAR	T_{j} (2.96)	2.4 km	MPC · JPL
357151	2002 CG_{9}	—	February 6, 2002	Kitt Peak	Spacewatch	·	4.0 km	MPC · JPL
357152	2002 CO_{15}	—	February 8, 2002	Palomar	NEAT	·	1.4 km	MPC · JPL
357153	2002 CO_{23}	—	February 6, 2002	Palomar	NEAT	·	1.5 km	MPC · JPL
357154	2002 CZ_{29}	—	February 3, 2002	Palomar	NEAT	·	2.6 km	MPC · JPL
357155	2002 CE_{31}	—	February 6, 2002	Socorro	LINEAR	·	2.8 km	MPC · JPL
357156	2002 CR_{53}	—	February 7, 2002	Socorro	LINEAR	·	4.0 km	MPC · JPL
357157	2002 CM_{85}	—	January 11, 2002	Kitt Peak	Spacewatch	·	2.5 km	MPC · JPL
357158	2002 CR_{98}	—	February 7, 2002	Socorro	LINEAR	·	3.3 km	MPC · JPL
357159	2002 CA_{111}	—	February 7, 2002	Socorro	LINEAR	·	1.7 km	MPC · JPL
357160	2002 CY_{127}	—	February 7, 2002	Socorro	LINEAR	·	2.1 km	MPC · JPL
357161	2002 CO_{160}	—	February 8, 2002	Socorro	LINEAR	·	1.4 km	MPC · JPL
357162	2002 CP_{200}	—	February 10, 2002	Socorro	LINEAR	·	2.3 km	MPC · JPL
357163	2002 CA_{202}	—	February 10, 2002	Socorro	LINEAR	·	2.4 km	MPC · JPL
357164	2002 CW_{202}	—	February 7, 2002	Kitt Peak	Spacewatch	·	3.7 km	MPC · JPL
357165	2002 CK_{250}	—	February 6, 2002	Kitt Peak	M. W. Buie	THM	2.2 km	MPC · JPL
357166	2002 CV_{255}	—	January 22, 2002	Socorro	LINEAR	H	610 m	MPC · JPL
357167	2002 CC_{265}	—	February 6, 2002	Kitt Peak	Spacewatch	·	1.9 km	MPC · JPL
357168	2002 CJ_{267}	—	February 7, 2002	Palomar	NEAT	THM	2.2 km	MPC · JPL
357169	2002 CG_{288}	—	February 10, 2002	Socorro	LINEAR	·	1.3 km	MPC · JPL
357170	2002 CT_{309}	—	February 6, 2002	Palomar	NEAT	·	1.2 km	MPC · JPL
357171	2002 CP_{311}	—	February 11, 2002	Socorro	LINEAR	·	990 m	MPC · JPL
357172	2002 DK_{3}	—	February 22, 2002	Nashville	Clingan, R.	·	4.0 km	MPC · JPL
357173	2002 DW_{16}	—	February 20, 2002	Anderson Mesa	LONEOS	H	600 m	MPC · JPL
357174	2002 ES_{9}	—	March 12, 2002	Socorro	LINEAR	H	570 m	MPC · JPL
357175	2002 EC_{17}	—	March 5, 2002	Kitt Peak	Spacewatch	NYS	960 m	MPC · JPL
357176	2002 EC_{23}	—	March 5, 2002	Kitt Peak	Spacewatch	MAS	560 m	MPC · JPL
357177	2002 EQ_{34}	—	March 11, 2002	Palomar	NEAT	ERI	1.5 km	MPC · JPL
357178	2002 EV_{59}	—	March 13, 2002	Socorro	LINEAR	·	2.5 km	MPC · JPL
357179	2002 ED_{70}	—	March 13, 2002	Socorro	LINEAR	·	3.3 km	MPC · JPL
357180	2002 EY_{77}	—	March 11, 2002	Kitt Peak	Spacewatch	·	1.1 km	MPC · JPL
357181	2002 EK_{95}	—	February 14, 2002	Kitt Peak	Spacewatch	·	1.2 km	MPC · JPL
357182	2002 EX_{97}	—	March 12, 2002	Socorro	LINEAR	·	2.2 km	MPC · JPL
357183	2002 ET_{102}	—	March 9, 2002	Kitt Peak	Spacewatch	L4	9.1 km	MPC · JPL
357184	2002 EK_{104}	—	March 9, 2002	Anderson Mesa	LONEOS	H	600 m	MPC · JPL
357185	2002 ET_{109}	—	March 9, 2002	Kitt Peak	Spacewatch	·	2.9 km	MPC · JPL
357186	2002 EZ_{111}	—	March 9, 2002	Kitt Peak	Spacewatch	·	1.2 km	MPC · JPL
357187	2002 EO_{112}	—	March 10, 2002	Kitt Peak	Spacewatch	NYS	1.0 km	MPC · JPL
357188	2002 EW_{116}	—	March 9, 2002	Kitt Peak	Spacewatch	·	1.4 km	MPC · JPL
357189	2002 ER_{142}	—	March 12, 2002	Palomar	NEAT	·	1.1 km	MPC · JPL
357190	2002 ET_{150}	—	March 15, 2002	Palomar	NEAT	MAS	750 m	MPC · JPL
357191	2002 EK_{155}	—	March 5, 2002	Anderson Mesa	LONEOS	TIR	3.5 km	MPC · JPL
357192	2002 EE_{163}	—	March 11, 2002	Palomar	NEAT	ERI	1.4 km	MPC · JPL
357193	2002 FM_{13}	—	March 16, 2002	Socorro	LINEAR	·	1.5 km	MPC · JPL
357194	2002 FU_{22}	—	March 19, 2002	Palomar	NEAT	PHO	1.0 km	MPC · JPL
357195	2002 FM_{32}	—	March 20, 2002	Socorro	LINEAR	·	3.4 km	MPC · JPL
357196	2002 FN_{32}	—	March 20, 2002	Palomar	NEAT	·	4.3 km	MPC · JPL
357197	2002 FD_{35}	—	March 20, 2002	Kitt Peak	Spacewatch	·	4.1 km	MPC · JPL
357198	2002 FV_{40}	—	March 20, 2002	Socorro	LINEAR	·	3.4 km	MPC · JPL
357199	2002 FZ_{40}	—	March 20, 2002	Socorro	LINEAR	·	4.1 km	MPC · JPL
357200	2002 GU_{5}	—	April 12, 2002	Palomar	NEAT	EUP	4.3 km	MPC · JPL

== 357201–357300 ==
back to top

Designation			Discovery			Properties		Ref
Permanent	Provisional	Named after	Date	Site	Discoverer(s)	Category	Diam.	Ref
357201	2002 GX_{5}	—	April 12, 2002	Palomar	NEAT	·	1.8 km	MPC · JPL
357202	2002 GG_{34}	—	April 1, 2002	Palomar	NEAT	·	1.3 km	MPC · JPL
357203	2002 GA_{38}	—	April 3, 2002	Kitt Peak	Spacewatch	·	1.4 km	MPC · JPL
357204	2002 GE_{38}	—	April 1, 2002	Palomar	NEAT	THB	4.7 km	MPC · JPL
357205	2002 GB_{43}	—	April 4, 2002	Haleakala	NEAT	·	1.6 km	MPC · JPL
357206	2002 GW_{68}	—	April 8, 2002	Palomar	NEAT	·	3.7 km	MPC · JPL
357207	2002 GZ_{71}	—	April 9, 2002	Anderson Mesa	LONEOS	·	1.5 km	MPC · JPL
357208	2002 GJ_{103}	—	April 10, 2002	Socorro	LINEAR	T_{j} (2.94)	6.0 km	MPC · JPL
357209	2002 GK_{112}	—	April 10, 2002	Socorro	LINEAR	·	5.1 km	MPC · JPL
357210	2002 GQ_{113}	—	April 11, 2002	Socorro	LINEAR	·	1.3 km	MPC · JPL
357211	2002 GU_{133}	—	April 12, 2002	Socorro	LINEAR	·	1.5 km	MPC · JPL
357212	2002 GV_{143}	—	April 13, 2002	Kitt Peak	Spacewatch	·	3.9 km	MPC · JPL
357213	2002 GX_{147}	—	April 13, 2002	Kitt Peak	Spacewatch	LIX	4.4 km	MPC · JPL
357214	2002 GC_{173}	—	April 10, 2002	Socorro	LINEAR	ERI	2.1 km	MPC · JPL
357215	2002 GH_{183}	—	April 8, 2002	Palomar	NEAT	V	800 m	MPC · JPL
357216	2002 GD_{185}	—	November 26, 2005	Mount Lemmon	Mount Lemmon Survey	THM	2.5 km	MPC · JPL
357217	2002 GY_{186}	—	April 8, 2002	Palomar	NEAT	MAS	770 m	MPC · JPL
357218	2002 GK_{190}	—	May 24, 2010	WISE	WISE	ERI	1.4 km	MPC · JPL
357219	2002 GP_{190}	—	September 18, 2010	Mount Lemmon	Mount Lemmon Survey	·	3.3 km	MPC · JPL
357220	2002 HP_{8}	—	April 19, 2002	Kitt Peak	Spacewatch	·	3.9 km	MPC · JPL
357221	2002 HK_{10}	—	April 17, 2002	Socorro	LINEAR	EUP	3.9 km	MPC · JPL
357222	2002 JY_{5}	—	May 5, 2002	Palomar	NEAT	·	3.8 km	MPC · JPL
357223	2002 JV_{7}	—	April 11, 2002	Palomar	NEAT	·	3.6 km	MPC · JPL
357224	2002 JN_{23}	—	May 8, 2002	Socorro	LINEAR	·	1.7 km	MPC · JPL
357225	2002 JV_{56}	—	May 9, 2002	Socorro	LINEAR	·	3.7 km	MPC · JPL
357226	2002 JJ_{60}	—	May 10, 2002	Socorro	LINEAR	·	3.2 km	MPC · JPL
357227	2002 JC_{92}	—	May 11, 2002	Socorro	LINEAR	MAS	890 m	MPC · JPL
357228	2002 JO_{92}	—	May 11, 2002	Socorro	LINEAR	·	1.5 km	MPC · JPL
357229	2002 JF_{108}	—	April 21, 2002	Palomar	NEAT	·	4.2 km	MPC · JPL
357230	2002 JO_{123}	—	April 6, 2002	Kvistaberg	Uppsala-DLR Asteroid Survey	T_{j} (2.99)	3.8 km	MPC · JPL
357231	2002 JE_{126}	—	May 7, 2002	Palomar	NEAT	·	1.7 km	MPC · JPL
357232	2002 JB_{127}	—	May 7, 2002	Anderson Mesa	LONEOS	·	4.7 km	MPC · JPL
357233	2002 JQ_{150}	—	September 18, 1995	Kitt Peak	Spacewatch	·	1.1 km	MPC · JPL
357234	2002 JA_{151}	—	May 4, 2002	Kitt Peak	Spacewatch	MAS	800 m	MPC · JPL
357235	2002 KC_{1}	—	May 16, 2002	Socorro	LINEAR	PHO	2.5 km	MPC · JPL
357236	2002 KX_{3}	—	May 18, 2002	Socorro	LINEAR	T_{j} (2.99) · EUP	3.3 km	MPC · JPL
357237	2002 LV_{53}	—	June 10, 2002	Socorro	LINEAR	·	5.1 km	MPC · JPL
357238	2002 LZ_{56}	—	June 10, 2002	Palomar	NEAT	·	1.3 km	MPC · JPL
357239	2002 LB_{61}	—	June 7, 2002	Palomar	NEAT	·	5.2 km	MPC · JPL
357240	2002 LQ_{63}	—	June 12, 2002	Palomar	NEAT	·	1.4 km	MPC · JPL
357241	2002 MC_{6}	—	June 20, 2002	Palomar	NEAT	·	1.6 km	MPC · JPL
357242	2002 OG_{25}	—	July 29, 2002	Palomar	S. F. Hönig	·	1.5 km	MPC · JPL
357243 Jefferies	2002 OQ_{37}	Jefferies	October 18, 2011	Haleakala	Pan-STARRS 1	EUN	1.3 km	MPC · JPL
357244	2002 PQ_{9}	—	August 5, 2002	Palomar	NEAT	·	1.3 km	MPC · JPL
357245	2002 PX_{17}	—	August 6, 2002	Palomar	NEAT	·	1.8 km	MPC · JPL
357246	2002 PG_{34}	—	August 6, 2002	Palomar	NEAT	·	1.3 km	MPC · JPL
357247	2002 PC_{36}	—	August 6, 2002	Palomar	NEAT	·	1.1 km	MPC · JPL
357248	2002 PE_{60}	—	August 10, 2002	Socorro	LINEAR	·	2.0 km	MPC · JPL
357249	2002 PQ_{68}	—	August 6, 2002	Palomar	NEAT	·	1.2 km	MPC · JPL
357250	2002 PN_{122}	—	August 14, 2002	Kitt Peak	Spacewatch	·	1.1 km	MPC · JPL
357251	2002 PR_{124}	—	August 13, 2002	Anderson Mesa	LONEOS	·	1.7 km	MPC · JPL
357252	2002 PF_{143}	—	August 9, 2002	Cerro Tololo	M. W. Buie	(5)	1.3 km	MPC · JPL
357253	2002 PQ_{171}	—	August 14, 2002	Palomar	NEAT	·	1.1 km	MPC · JPL
357254	2002 PN_{173}	—	August 8, 2002	Palomar	NEAT	·	1.3 km	MPC · JPL
357255	2002 PY_{177}	—	August 15, 2002	Palomar	NEAT	EUN	3.0 km	MPC · JPL
357256	2002 PN_{194}	—	August 11, 2002	Palomar	NEAT	·	1.3 km	MPC · JPL
357257	2002 PL_{197}	—	August 7, 2002	Palomar	NEAT	·	1.3 km	MPC · JPL
357258	2002 QY_{23}	—	August 28, 2002	Palomar	NEAT	·	2.0 km	MPC · JPL
357259	2002 QX_{51}	—	August 29, 2002	Palomar	NEAT	·	1.7 km	MPC · JPL
357260	2002 QE_{94}	—	August 30, 2002	Palomar	NEAT	(5)	1.3 km	MPC · JPL
357261	2002 QL_{111}	—	August 18, 2002	Palomar	NEAT	·	2.1 km	MPC · JPL
357262	2002 QN_{111}	—	August 18, 2002	Palomar	NEAT	·	2.4 km	MPC · JPL
357263	2002 QB_{141}	—	February 28, 2010	WISE	WISE	·	2.4 km	MPC · JPL
357264	2002 QQ_{144}	—	May 20, 2005	Mount Lemmon	Mount Lemmon Survey	KON	3.3 km	MPC · JPL
357265	2002 QM_{145}	—	April 10, 2005	Mount Lemmon	Mount Lemmon Survey	·	1.2 km	MPC · JPL
357266	2002 QT_{147}	—	March 3, 2005	Kitt Peak	Spacewatch	·	1.2 km	MPC · JPL
357267	2002 QP_{152}	—	February 1, 2009	Kitt Peak	Spacewatch	EUN	1.1 km	MPC · JPL
357268	2002 RU_{68}	—	September 4, 2002	Anderson Mesa	LONEOS	·	1.5 km	MPC · JPL
357269	2002 RP_{85}	—	September 5, 2002	Socorro	LINEAR	·	2.1 km	MPC · JPL
357270	2002 RH_{87}	—	September 5, 2002	Socorro	LINEAR	·	2.1 km	MPC · JPL
357271	2002 RE_{137}	—	September 12, 2002	Goodricke-Pigott	R. A. Tucker	EUN	1.6 km	MPC · JPL
357272	2002 RG_{147}	—	September 11, 2002	Palomar	NEAT	·	1.7 km	MPC · JPL
357273	2002 RM_{215}	—	September 5, 2002	Haleakala	NEAT	·	1.7 km	MPC · JPL
357274	2002 RA_{221}	—	September 15, 2002	Palomar	NEAT	·	1.6 km	MPC · JPL
357275	2002 RX_{261}	—	September 13, 2002	Palomar	NEAT	·	3.6 km	MPC · JPL
357276	2002 RH_{279}	—	September 12, 2002	Palomar	NEAT	EUN	1.6 km	MPC · JPL
357277	2002 RA_{286}	—	August 13, 2006	Siding Spring	SSS	EUN	1.6 km	MPC · JPL
357278	2002 SY_{4}	—	September 27, 2002	Palomar	NEAT	MAR	1.4 km	MPC · JPL
357279	2002 SG_{30}	—	September 19, 2002	Palomar	NEAT	·	2.4 km	MPC · JPL
357280	2002 SE_{40}	—	September 30, 2002	Haleakala	NEAT	EUN	1.6 km	MPC · JPL
357281	2002 SX_{62}	—	September 16, 2002	Palomar	R. Matson	·	1.3 km	MPC · JPL
357282	2002 SY_{66}	—	September 29, 2002	Kvistaberg	Uppsala-DLR Asteroid Survey	·	3.4 km	MPC · JPL
357283	2002 TM_{82}	—	October 2, 2002	Socorro	LINEAR	NEM	2.7 km	MPC · JPL
357284	2002 TK_{123}	—	September 12, 2002	Palomar	NEAT	·	2.1 km	MPC · JPL
357285	2002 TY_{131}	—	October 4, 2002	Socorro	LINEAR	·	2.1 km	MPC · JPL
357286	2002 TA_{156}	—	October 5, 2002	Palomar	NEAT	·	1.9 km	MPC · JPL
357287	2002 TF_{172}	—	October 4, 2002	Palomar	NEAT	BAR	1.7 km	MPC · JPL
357288	2002 TZ_{174}	—	October 4, 2002	Socorro	LINEAR	·	2.1 km	MPC · JPL
357289	2002 TE_{221}	—	October 6, 2002	Socorro	LINEAR	·	2.6 km	MPC · JPL
357290	2002 TZ_{324}	—	October 4, 2002	Palomar	NEAT	·	1.8 km	MPC · JPL
357291	2002 TN_{327}	—	October 5, 2002	Apache Point	SDSS	·	1.3 km	MPC · JPL
357292	2002 UF_{35}	—	October 31, 2002	Socorro	LINEAR	·	2.9 km	MPC · JPL
357293	2002 UR_{62}	—	September 13, 2002	Palomar	NEAT	·	1.9 km	MPC · JPL
357294	2002 UK_{74}	—	October 30, 2002	Palomar	NEAT	·	1.5 km	MPC · JPL
357295	2002 VE_{2}	—	November 2, 2002	Haleakala	NEAT	·	3.1 km	MPC · JPL
357296	2002 VX_{20}	—	November 5, 2002	Socorro	LINEAR	·	2.1 km	MPC · JPL
357297	2002 VT_{57}	—	November 6, 2002	Haleakala	NEAT	·	1.8 km	MPC · JPL
357298	2002 VD_{74}	—	November 7, 2002	Socorro	LINEAR	·	2.9 km	MPC · JPL
357299	2002 VJ_{75}	—	October 30, 2002	Haleakala	NEAT	·	2.0 km	MPC · JPL
357300	2002 VK_{143}	—	November 13, 2002	Kitt Peak	Spacewatch	·	1.9 km	MPC · JPL

== 357301–357400 ==
back to top

Designation			Discovery			Properties		Ref
Permanent	Provisional	Named after	Date	Site	Discoverer(s)	Category	Diam.	Ref
357301	2002 VC_{144}	—	October 6, 2005	Mount Lemmon	Mount Lemmon Survey	·	510 m	MPC · JPL
357302	2002 VM_{147}	—	November 3, 2002	Palomar	NEAT	·	1.7 km	MPC · JPL
357303	2002 WE_{27}	—	November 16, 2002	Palomar	NEAT	·	1.6 km	MPC · JPL
357304	2002 XK_{33}	—	December 7, 2002	Socorro	LINEAR	EUN	1.6 km	MPC · JPL
357305	2002 XT_{89}	—	December 14, 2002	Socorro	LINEAR	·	2.2 km	MPC · JPL
357306	2003 AC_{40}	—	January 7, 2003	Socorro	LINEAR	·	2.4 km	MPC · JPL
357307	2003 AV_{49}	—	January 5, 2003	Socorro	LINEAR	·	3.3 km	MPC · JPL
357308	2003 AM_{72}	—	January 11, 2003	Socorro	LINEAR	H	730 m	MPC · JPL
357309	2003 BY_{40}	—	January 28, 2003	Socorro	LINEAR	·	2.0 km	MPC · JPL
357310	2003 CM_{10}	—	February 3, 2003	Socorro	LINEAR	·	2.7 km	MPC · JPL
357311	2003 DC_{14}	—	February 26, 2003	Socorro	LINEAR	AMO +1km	1.6 km	MPC · JPL
357312	2003 ET_{14}	—	February 4, 2003	Socorro	LINEAR	·	1.0 km	MPC · JPL
357313	2003 FK_{45}	—	March 24, 2003	Kitt Peak	Spacewatch	·	2.7 km	MPC · JPL
357314	2003 FX_{64}	—	July 1, 1997	Kitt Peak	Spacewatch	·	1.1 km	MPC · JPL
357315	2003 FL_{122}	—	March 31, 2003	Cerro Tololo	Deep Lens Survey	·	2.1 km	MPC · JPL
357316	2003 FX_{123}	—	March 30, 2003	Kitt Peak	M. W. Buie	·	890 m	MPC · JPL
357317	2003 FL_{131}	—	March 26, 2003	Kitt Peak	Spacewatch	·	670 m	MPC · JPL
357318	2003 FS_{133}	—	March 31, 2003	Anderson Mesa	LONEOS	·	2.0 km	MPC · JPL
357319	2003 GR_{8}	—	April 1, 2003	Socorro	LINEAR	·	830 m	MPC · JPL
357320	2003 GB_{38}	—	April 8, 2003	Kitt Peak	Spacewatch	·	760 m	MPC · JPL
357321	2003 GZ_{54}	—	April 4, 2003	Kitt Peak	Spacewatch	·	1.9 km	MPC · JPL
357322	2003 HW_{5}	—	April 24, 2003	Kitt Peak	Spacewatch	·	880 m	MPC · JPL
357323	2003 HR_{20}	—	April 24, 2003	Anderson Mesa	LONEOS	·	850 m	MPC · JPL
357324	2003 HQ_{44}	—	April 28, 2003	Kitt Peak	Spacewatch	·	2.3 km	MPC · JPL
357325	2003 JL	—	May 1, 2003	Kitt Peak	Spacewatch	·	1.8 km	MPC · JPL
357326	2003 JQ_{15}	—	May 6, 2003	Kitt Peak	Spacewatch	·	2.6 km	MPC · JPL
357327	2003 KE_{11}	—	May 27, 2003	Kitt Peak	Spacewatch	H	570 m	MPC · JPL
357328	2003 KA_{17}	—	May 29, 2003	Socorro	LINEAR	PHO	1.4 km	MPC · JPL
357329	2003 LK	—	February 6, 2002	Kitt Peak	Spacewatch	·	3.1 km	MPC · JPL
357330	2003 MW_{1}	—	June 22, 2003	Anderson Mesa	LONEOS	H	700 m	MPC · JPL
357331	2003 NH_{6}	—	July 5, 2003	Socorro	LINEAR	T_{j} (2.99)	3.5 km	MPC · JPL
357332	2003 NO_{6}	—	July 5, 2003	Haleakala	NEAT	EUP	3.5 km	MPC · JPL
357333	2003 NJ_{7}	—	July 7, 2003	Palomar	NEAT	·	1.2 km	MPC · JPL
357334	2003 OJ_{12}	—	July 22, 2003	Palomar	NEAT	PHO	1.1 km	MPC · JPL
357335	2003 OE_{15}	—	July 22, 2003	Palomar	NEAT	·	1.8 km	MPC · JPL
357336	2003 OT_{17}	—	July 29, 2003	Reedy Creek	J. Broughton	·	1.1 km	MPC · JPL
357337	2003 OG_{33}	—	July 24, 2003	Palomar	NEAT	·	3.8 km	MPC · JPL
357338	2003 PE_{11}	—	August 1, 2003	Bergisch Gladbach	W. Bickel	·	1.3 km	MPC · JPL
357339	2003 QB_{12}	—	August 21, 2003	Campo Imperatore	CINEOS	MAS	800 m	MPC · JPL
357340	2003 QN_{13}	—	August 22, 2003	Palomar	NEAT	PHO	1.2 km	MPC · JPL
357341	2003 QU_{13}	—	August 23, 2003	Socorro	LINEAR	·	1.3 km	MPC · JPL
357342	2003 QK_{17}	—	August 22, 2003	Palomar	NEAT	·	1.2 km	MPC · JPL
357343	2003 QJ_{23}	—	August 20, 2003	Palomar	NEAT	T_{j} (2.99) · EUP	4.7 km	MPC · JPL
357344	2003 QQ_{30}	—	August 23, 2003	Palomar	NEAT	H	600 m	MPC · JPL
357345	2003 QB_{35}	—	August 22, 2003	Palomar	NEAT	·	2.2 km	MPC · JPL
357346	2003 QC_{41}	—	August 22, 2003	Socorro	LINEAR	·	1.8 km	MPC · JPL
357347	2003 QA_{44}	—	August 22, 2003	Haleakala	NEAT	·	1.3 km	MPC · JPL
357348	2003 QJ_{46}	—	August 23, 2003	Palomar	NEAT	H	690 m	MPC · JPL
357349	2003 QA_{52}	—	August 23, 2003	Palomar	NEAT	TIR	3.5 km	MPC · JPL
357350	2003 QH_{58}	—	August 23, 2003	Socorro	LINEAR	·	2.2 km	MPC · JPL
357351	2003 QZ_{72}	—	August 24, 2003	Socorro	LINEAR	H	690 m	MPC · JPL
357352	2003 QE_{95}	—	August 29, 2003	Haleakala	NEAT	·	1.3 km	MPC · JPL
357353	2003 QT_{106}	—	August 30, 2003	Haleakala	NEAT	·	1.5 km	MPC · JPL
357354	2003 RJ_{3}	—	August 25, 2003	Socorro	LINEAR	V	860 m	MPC · JPL
357355	2003 RV_{8}	—	September 7, 2003	Socorro	LINEAR	·	1.6 km	MPC · JPL
357356	2003 RH_{16}	—	September 15, 2003	Palomar	NEAT	·	1.2 km	MPC · JPL
357357	2003 RN_{25}	—	September 15, 2003	Palomar	NEAT	H	620 m	MPC · JPL
357358	2003 SK_{13}	—	September 16, 2003	Kitt Peak	Spacewatch	·	1.9 km	MPC · JPL
357359	2003 SU_{16}	—	September 17, 2003	Kitt Peak	Spacewatch	·	910 m	MPC · JPL
357360	2003 SJ_{25}	—	September 17, 2003	Kitt Peak	Spacewatch	·	1.5 km	MPC · JPL
357361	2003 SK_{93}	—	September 18, 2003	Palomar	NEAT	·	1.4 km	MPC · JPL
357362	2003 SX_{113}	—	September 16, 2003	Anderson Mesa	LONEOS	·	1.3 km	MPC · JPL
357363	2003 SB_{142}	—	September 20, 2003	Palomar	NEAT	·	2.6 km	MPC · JPL
357364	2003 SJ_{143}	—	September 20, 2003	Palomar	NEAT	·	1.5 km	MPC · JPL
357365	2003 SH_{158}	—	September 22, 2003	Reedy Creek	J. Broughton	·	3.8 km	MPC · JPL
357366	2003 SU_{163}	—	September 20, 2003	Anderson Mesa	LONEOS	H	510 m	MPC · JPL
357367	2003 SP_{165}	—	September 20, 2003	Anderson Mesa	LONEOS	·	1.8 km	MPC · JPL
357368	2003 SC_{167}	—	September 22, 2003	Socorro	LINEAR	·	1.9 km	MPC · JPL
357369	2003 SM_{182}	—	September 20, 2003	Kitt Peak	Spacewatch	·	3.5 km	MPC · JPL
357370	2003 SW_{184}	—	September 21, 2003	Kitt Peak	Spacewatch	MAS	800 m	MPC · JPL
357371	2003 SH_{193}	—	September 20, 2003	Palomar	NEAT	·	1.7 km	MPC · JPL
357372	2003 SG_{201}	—	April 12, 2002	Palomar	NEAT	H	580 m	MPC · JPL
357373	2003 SO_{228}	—	September 26, 2003	Socorro	LINEAR	·	1.2 km	MPC · JPL
357374	2003 ST_{232}	—	September 25, 2003	Palomar	NEAT	·	1.7 km	MPC · JPL
357375	2003 SB_{264}	—	September 28, 2003	Socorro	LINEAR	(5)	1.4 km	MPC · JPL
357376	2003 SW_{277}	—	September 30, 2003	Socorro	LINEAR	·	1.5 km	MPC · JPL
357377	2003 SW_{319}	—	September 29, 2003	Kitt Peak	Spacewatch	·	1.3 km	MPC · JPL
357378	2003 SF_{328}	—	September 20, 2003	Kitt Peak	Spacewatch	·	1.3 km	MPC · JPL
357379	2003 SH_{388}	—	October 2, 2003	Kitt Peak	Spacewatch	·	1.6 km	MPC · JPL
357380	2003 TF_{46}	—	October 3, 2003	Kitt Peak	Spacewatch	·	1.2 km	MPC · JPL
357381	2003 UH_{14}	—	October 16, 2003	Kitt Peak	Spacewatch	·	1.3 km	MPC · JPL
357382	2003 UD_{26}	—	October 23, 2003	Anderson Mesa	LONEOS	·	2.3 km	MPC · JPL
357383	2003 UM_{33}	—	October 17, 2003	Kitt Peak	Spacewatch	MAS	760 m	MPC · JPL
357384	2003 UP_{43}	—	October 17, 2003	Kitt Peak	Spacewatch	MAS	770 m	MPC · JPL
357385	2003 UH_{48}	—	October 16, 2003	Anderson Mesa	LONEOS	·	1.2 km	MPC · JPL
357386	2003 UN_{49}	—	October 16, 2003	Palomar	NEAT	·	2.0 km	MPC · JPL
357387	2003 UW_{65}	—	October 16, 2003	Palomar	NEAT	·	1.2 km	MPC · JPL
357388	2003 UK_{76}	—	October 17, 2003	Anderson Mesa	LONEOS	·	1.4 km	MPC · JPL
357389	2003 UA_{83}	—	October 16, 2003	Anderson Mesa	LONEOS	·	1.3 km	MPC · JPL
357390	2003 UF_{101}	—	October 20, 2003	Palomar	NEAT	·	1.1 km	MPC · JPL
357391	2003 UO_{113}	—	October 20, 2003	Socorro	LINEAR	·	1.5 km	MPC · JPL
357392	2003 UM_{143}	—	October 18, 2003	Anderson Mesa	LONEOS	·	1.7 km	MPC · JPL
357393	2003 UP_{156}	—	October 20, 2003	Socorro	LINEAR	·	1.1 km	MPC · JPL
357394	2003 UC_{182}	—	October 21, 2003	Socorro	LINEAR	·	2.1 km	MPC · JPL
357395	2003 UU_{195}	—	October 20, 2003	Kitt Peak	Spacewatch	MAS	1.0 km	MPC · JPL
357396	2003 UO_{210}	—	October 23, 2003	Kitt Peak	Spacewatch	·	890 m	MPC · JPL
357397	2003 UF_{219}	—	October 21, 2003	Palomar	NEAT	·	1.0 km	MPC · JPL
357398	2003 UZ_{228}	—	October 23, 2003	Anderson Mesa	LONEOS	·	1.2 km	MPC · JPL
357399	2003 UE_{232}	—	October 24, 2003	Kitt Peak	Spacewatch	·	1.4 km	MPC · JPL
357400	2003 UV_{240}	—	October 24, 2003	Kitt Peak	Spacewatch	V	890 m	MPC · JPL

== 357401–357500 ==
back to top

Designation			Discovery			Properties		Ref
Permanent	Provisional	Named after	Date	Site	Discoverer(s)	Category	Diam.	Ref
357401	2003 UE_{245}	—	October 24, 2003	Haleakala	NEAT	·	1.7 km	MPC · JPL
357402	2003 UD_{249}	—	October 25, 2003	Socorro	LINEAR	·	1.6 km	MPC · JPL
357403	2003 UG_{291}	—	October 23, 2003	Kitt Peak	Spacewatch	·	1.4 km	MPC · JPL
357404	2003 UN_{341}	—	October 19, 2003	Apache Point	SDSS	PHO	1.2 km	MPC · JPL
357405	2003 UM_{382}	—	October 22, 2003	Apache Point	SDSS	·	1.3 km	MPC · JPL
357406	2003 VB_{3}	—	November 15, 2003	Kitt Peak	Spacewatch	·	570 m	MPC · JPL
357407	2003 WN_{12}	—	November 16, 2003	Socorro	LINEAR	·	5.4 km	MPC · JPL
357408	2003 WD_{15}	—	November 16, 2003	Kitt Peak	Spacewatch	·	1.5 km	MPC · JPL
357409	2003 WN_{81}	—	November 20, 2003	Kitt Peak	Spacewatch	(5)	1.2 km	MPC · JPL
357410	2003 WK_{98}	—	November 24, 2003	Kitt Peak	Spacewatch	·	970 m	MPC · JPL
357411	2003 WU_{126}	—	November 20, 2003	Socorro	LINEAR	·	1.9 km	MPC · JPL
357412	2003 WN_{172}	—	November 30, 2003	Catalina	CSS	(1547)	2.6 km	MPC · JPL
357413	2003 WF_{190}	—	November 24, 2003	Socorro	LINEAR	·	2.4 km	MPC · JPL
357414	2003 XE	—	December 1, 2003	Socorro	LINEAR	AMO	770 m	MPC · JPL
357415	2003 XA_{5}	—	December 1, 2003	Catalina	CSS	·	2.0 km	MPC · JPL
357416	2003 XF_{10}	—	December 4, 2003	Socorro	LINEAR	·	2.2 km	MPC · JPL
357417	2003 XH_{16}	—	December 14, 2003	Palomar	NEAT	·	1.5 km	MPC · JPL
357418	2003 XJ_{42}	—	December 14, 2003	Kitt Peak	Spacewatch	LIX	4.3 km	MPC · JPL
357419	2003 YC_{12}	—	December 17, 2003	Socorro	LINEAR	BRG	1.9 km	MPC · JPL
357420	2003 YY_{20}	—	December 17, 2003	Kitt Peak	Spacewatch	·	1.6 km	MPC · JPL
357421	2003 YF_{29}	—	December 17, 2003	Kitt Peak	Spacewatch	·	1.2 km	MPC · JPL
357422	2003 YT_{54}	—	December 19, 2003	Socorro	LINEAR	·	1.2 km	MPC · JPL
357423	2003 YQ_{60}	—	December 19, 2003	Kitt Peak	Spacewatch	·	1.4 km	MPC · JPL
357424	2003 YZ_{65}	—	December 20, 2003	Socorro	LINEAR	·	1.6 km	MPC · JPL
357425	2003 YD_{79}	—	December 18, 2003	Socorro	LINEAR	·	1.9 km	MPC · JPL
357426	2003 YS_{87}	—	December 19, 2003	Socorro	LINEAR	·	1.7 km	MPC · JPL
357427	2003 YH_{121}	—	December 27, 2003	Socorro	LINEAR	·	3.3 km	MPC · JPL
357428	2003 YE_{123}	—	December 27, 2003	Socorro	LINEAR	·	2.1 km	MPC · JPL
357429	2003 YW_{133}	—	December 28, 2003	Socorro	LINEAR	·	2.2 km	MPC · JPL
357430	2003 YP_{135}	—	December 28, 2003	Socorro	LINEAR	·	2.5 km	MPC · JPL
357431	2003 YP_{138}	—	December 27, 2003	Socorro	LINEAR	·	3.2 km	MPC · JPL
357432	2003 YG_{141}	—	December 28, 2003	Socorro	LINEAR	·	2.1 km	MPC · JPL
357433	2003 YP_{144}	—	December 28, 2003	Socorro	LINEAR	·	2.1 km	MPC · JPL
357434	2004 AJ_{6}	—	January 15, 2004	Kitt Peak	Spacewatch	(5)	1.4 km	MPC · JPL
357435	2004 AU_{19}	—	January 15, 2004	Kitt Peak	Spacewatch	·	1.3 km	MPC · JPL
357436	2004 BK_{40}	—	January 21, 2004	Socorro	LINEAR	·	4.2 km	MPC · JPL
357437	2004 BN_{46}	—	January 21, 2004	Socorro	LINEAR	BAR	2.0 km	MPC · JPL
357438	2004 BB_{76}	—	January 23, 2004	Socorro	LINEAR	·	2.6 km	MPC · JPL
357439	2004 BL_{86}	—	January 30, 2004	Socorro	LINEAR	APO · PHA · moon	490 m	MPC · JPL
357440	2004 BE_{89}	—	January 23, 2004	Socorro	LINEAR	·	1.5 km	MPC · JPL
357441	2004 BK_{98}	—	January 27, 2004	Kitt Peak	Spacewatch	·	1.5 km	MPC · JPL
357442	2004 BG_{115}	—	January 30, 2004	Catalina	CSS	·	2.3 km	MPC · JPL
357443	2004 BC_{135}	—	January 18, 2004	Kitt Peak	Spacewatch	·	1.8 km	MPC · JPL
357444	2004 BS_{143}	—	January 19, 2004	Kitt Peak	Spacewatch	·	1.6 km	MPC · JPL
357445	2004 CX_{16}	—	February 11, 2004	Kitt Peak	Spacewatch	·	1.3 km	MPC · JPL
357446	2004 CY_{39}	—	February 12, 2004	Desert Eagle	W. K. Y. Yeung	·	2.6 km	MPC · JPL
357447	2004 CH_{59}	—	February 10, 2004	Palomar	NEAT	·	2.0 km	MPC · JPL
357448	2004 CS_{59}	—	February 10, 2004	Palomar	NEAT	·	2.5 km	MPC · JPL
357449	2004 CB_{61}	—	February 11, 2004	Kitt Peak	Spacewatch	·	1.7 km	MPC · JPL
357450	2004 CJ_{72}	—	February 13, 2004	Kitt Peak	Spacewatch	·	2.2 km	MPC · JPL
357451	2004 CD_{83}	—	February 12, 2004	Kitt Peak	Spacewatch	·	2.5 km	MPC · JPL
357452	2004 CZ_{109}	—	February 14, 2004	Palomar	NEAT	JUN	1.5 km	MPC · JPL
357453	2004 DK_{8}	—	February 17, 2004	Kitt Peak	Spacewatch	·	1.7 km	MPC · JPL
357454	2004 DH_{17}	—	January 29, 2004	Socorro	LINEAR	EUN	1.7 km	MPC · JPL
357455	2004 DJ_{36}	—	February 13, 2004	Kitt Peak	Spacewatch	·	1.9 km	MPC · JPL
357456	2004 DP_{39}	—	February 23, 2004	Socorro	LINEAR	·	2.2 km	MPC · JPL
357457	2004 EZ_{1}	—	March 12, 2004	Palomar	NEAT	·	2.0 km	MPC · JPL
357458	2004 EL_{16}	—	March 12, 2004	Palomar	NEAT	DOR	2.9 km	MPC · JPL
357459	2004 EP_{24}	—	March 14, 2004	Socorro	LINEAR	·	1.9 km	MPC · JPL
357460	2004 EA_{40}	—	March 15, 2004	Socorro	LINEAR	·	2.5 km	MPC · JPL
357461	2004 ER_{48}	—	March 15, 2004	Socorro	LINEAR	·	2.1 km	MPC · JPL
357462	2004 EQ_{64}	—	March 14, 2004	Socorro	LINEAR	·	2.2 km	MPC · JPL
357463	2004 EG_{69}	—	March 15, 2004	Socorro	LINEAR	·	2.4 km	MPC · JPL
357464	2004 EU_{83}	—	March 14, 2004	Kitt Peak	Spacewatch	EUN	1.7 km	MPC · JPL
357465	2004 ES_{90}	—	March 14, 2004	Kitt Peak	Spacewatch	·	1.7 km	MPC · JPL
357466	2004 EK_{91}	—	March 15, 2004	Kitt Peak	Spacewatch	·	2.2 km	MPC · JPL
357467	2004 EX_{95}	—	March 1, 2004	Socorro	LINEAR	·	2.8 km	MPC · JPL
357468	2004 EA_{96}	—	March 15, 2004	Socorro	LINEAR	·	2.4 km	MPC · JPL
357469	2004 FS_{41}	—	March 27, 2004	Socorro	LINEAR	·	3.0 km	MPC · JPL
357470	2004 FV_{42}	—	March 18, 2004	Socorro	LINEAR	EUN	1.4 km	MPC · JPL
357471	2004 FS_{53}	—	February 29, 2004	Kitt Peak	Spacewatch	HOF	2.9 km	MPC · JPL
357472	2004 FV_{58}	—	March 17, 2004	Kitt Peak	Spacewatch	MRX	900 m	MPC · JPL
357473	2004 FF_{84}	—	March 18, 2004	Kitt Peak	Spacewatch	GEF	1.6 km	MPC · JPL
357474	2004 FB_{87}	—	March 19, 2004	Palomar	NEAT	·	2.4 km	MPC · JPL
357475	2004 FT_{94}	—	March 19, 2004	Palomar	NEAT	·	2.1 km	MPC · JPL
357476	2004 FB_{109}	—	March 23, 2004	Kitt Peak	Spacewatch	·	2.2 km	MPC · JPL
357477	2004 FB_{111}	—	March 16, 2004	Kitt Peak	Spacewatch	·	2.6 km	MPC · JPL
357478	2004 FH_{131}	—	March 22, 2004	Anderson Mesa	LONEOS	·	2.8 km	MPC · JPL
357479	2004 GJ_{3}	—	April 9, 2004	Siding Spring	SSS	·	2.6 km	MPC · JPL
357480	2004 GL_{40}	—	April 12, 2004	Anderson Mesa	LONEOS	·	2.2 km	MPC · JPL
357481	2004 GC_{46}	—	April 12, 2004	Kitt Peak	Spacewatch	·	1.7 km	MPC · JPL
357482	2004 HR_{4}	—	April 16, 2004	Socorro	LINEAR	·	2.0 km	MPC · JPL
357483	2004 HZ_{24}	—	April 19, 2004	Socorro	LINEAR	·	1.8 km	MPC · JPL
357484	2004 HO_{37}	—	April 21, 2004	Catalina	CSS	·	2.3 km	MPC · JPL
357485	2004 JA_{29}	—	May 15, 2004	Socorro	LINEAR	·	2.4 km	MPC · JPL
357486	2004 JM_{31}	—	May 15, 2004	Campo Imperatore	CINEOS	·	2.6 km	MPC · JPL
357487	2004 JG_{39}	—	May 14, 2004	Kitt Peak	Spacewatch	·	4.8 km	MPC · JPL
357488	2004 JR_{47}	—	May 13, 2004	Kitt Peak	Spacewatch	AGN	1.2 km	MPC · JPL
357489	2004 KH	—	May 16, 2004	Campo Imperatore	CINEOS	·	2.6 km	MPC · JPL
357490	2004 KN_{9}	—	May 19, 2004	Socorro	LINEAR	·	2.2 km	MPC · JPL
357491	2004 LH_{9}	—	June 13, 2004	Kitt Peak	Spacewatch	·	2.1 km	MPC · JPL
357492	2004 NL_{7}	—	July 14, 2004	Socorro	LINEAR	·	710 m	MPC · JPL
357493	2004 NH_{29}	—	July 14, 2004	Socorro	LINEAR	·	3.4 km	MPC · JPL
357494	2004 OY_{10}	—	July 22, 2004	Anderson Mesa	LONEOS	·	3.6 km	MPC · JPL
357495	2004 PG_{16}	—	August 7, 2004	Palomar	NEAT	·	5.1 km	MPC · JPL
357496	2004 PK_{30}	—	August 8, 2004	Campo Imperatore	CINEOS	·	790 m	MPC · JPL
357497	2004 PP_{31}	—	August 8, 2004	Socorro	LINEAR	EOS	2.4 km	MPC · JPL
357498	2004 PK_{36}	—	August 9, 2004	Socorro	LINEAR	·	1.9 km	MPC · JPL
357499	2004 PM_{40}	—	August 9, 2004	Socorro	LINEAR	·	3.9 km	MPC · JPL
357500	2004 PT_{82}	—	August 10, 2004	Socorro	LINEAR	·	820 m	MPC · JPL

== 357501–357600 ==
back to top

Designation			Discovery			Properties		Ref
Permanent	Provisional	Named after	Date	Site	Discoverer(s)	Category	Diam.	Ref
357501	2004 PO_{83}	—	August 10, 2004	Socorro	LINEAR	·	4.2 km	MPC · JPL
357502	2004 PW_{85}	—	August 10, 2004	Anderson Mesa	LONEOS	·	750 m	MPC · JPL
357503	2004 PA_{95}	—	August 11, 2004	Socorro	LINEAR	EOS	2.3 km	MPC · JPL
357504	2004 PL_{98}	—	August 8, 2004	Socorro	LINEAR	·	900 m	MPC · JPL
357505	2004 PG_{107}	—	August 15, 2004	Palomar	NEAT	·	4.8 km	MPC · JPL
357506	2004 PK_{110}	—	August 12, 2004	Socorro	LINEAR	·	860 m	MPC · JPL
357507	2004 PX_{112}	—	August 12, 2004	Palomar	NEAT	·	4.1 km	MPC · JPL
357508	2004 QP_{7}	—	August 22, 2004	Bergisch Gladbach	W. Bickel	·	660 m	MPC · JPL
357509	2004 RT_{2}	—	September 7, 2004	Kitt Peak	Spacewatch	·	960 m	MPC · JPL
357510	2004 RD_{10}	—	September 7, 2004	Kitt Peak	Spacewatch	·	790 m	MPC · JPL
357511	2004 RQ_{14}	—	September 6, 2004	Siding Spring	SSS	T_{j} (2.98)	4.1 km	MPC · JPL
357512	2004 RQ_{32}	—	September 7, 2004	Socorro	LINEAR	·	730 m	MPC · JPL
357513	2004 RX_{39}	—	September 7, 2004	Kitt Peak	Spacewatch	·	2.5 km	MPC · JPL
357514	2004 RH_{54}	—	September 8, 2004	Socorro	LINEAR	·	4.1 km	MPC · JPL
357515	2004 RL_{80}	—	September 8, 2004	Socorro	LINEAR	·	3.3 km	MPC · JPL
357516	2004 RZ_{82}	—	September 9, 2004	Socorro	LINEAR	·	750 m	MPC · JPL
357517	2004 RX_{85}	—	September 6, 2004	Siding Spring	SSS	·	1.3 km	MPC · JPL
357518	2004 RU_{96}	—	September 8, 2004	Socorro	LINEAR	·	3.9 km	MPC · JPL
357519	2004 RU_{98}	—	September 8, 2004	Socorro	LINEAR	·	3.8 km	MPC · JPL
357520	2004 RJ_{104}	—	September 8, 2004	Palomar	NEAT	LIX	4.0 km	MPC · JPL
357521	2004 RA_{105}	—	September 8, 2004	Palomar	NEAT	V	700 m	MPC · JPL
357522	2004 RV_{111}	—	August 26, 2004	Socorro	LINEAR	PHO	1.2 km	MPC · JPL
357523	2004 RT_{113}	—	September 7, 2004	Socorro	LINEAR	·	830 m	MPC · JPL
357524	2004 RS_{139}	—	September 8, 2004	Socorro	LINEAR	·	910 m	MPC · JPL
357525	2004 RO_{140}	—	September 8, 2004	Socorro	LINEAR	·	3.9 km	MPC · JPL
357526	2004 RQ_{141}	—	September 8, 2004	Socorro	LINEAR	·	870 m	MPC · JPL
357527	2004 RF_{144}	—	September 8, 2004	Socorro	LINEAR	·	970 m	MPC · JPL
357528	2004 RC_{153}	—	August 22, 2004	Kitt Peak	Spacewatch	·	770 m	MPC · JPL
357529	2004 RR_{161}	—	September 11, 2004	Kitt Peak	Spacewatch	·	3.1 km	MPC · JPL
357530	2004 RK_{164}	—	September 7, 2004	Socorro	LINEAR	·	1.0 km	MPC · JPL
357531	2004 RV_{172}	—	September 9, 2004	Kitt Peak	Spacewatch	EOS	2.2 km	MPC · JPL
357532	2004 RQ_{176}	—	September 10, 2004	Socorro	LINEAR	·	2.4 km	MPC · JPL
357533	2004 RL_{185}	—	September 10, 2004	Socorro	LINEAR	·	4.8 km	MPC · JPL
357534	2004 RO_{186}	—	September 10, 2004	Socorro	LINEAR	V	630 m	MPC · JPL
357535	2004 RO_{196}	—	September 10, 2004	Socorro	LINEAR	·	5.9 km	MPC · JPL
357536	2004 RV_{202}	—	September 11, 2004	Kitt Peak	Spacewatch	·	2.6 km	MPC · JPL
357537	2004 RJ_{238}	—	September 10, 2004	Kitt Peak	Spacewatch	·	3.0 km	MPC · JPL
357538	2004 RP_{240}	—	September 10, 2004	Kitt Peak	Spacewatch	·	3.2 km	MPC · JPL
357539	2004 RJ_{256}	—	September 8, 2004	Socorro	LINEAR	·	800 m	MPC · JPL
357540	2004 RC_{267}	—	September 11, 2004	Kitt Peak	Spacewatch	·	870 m	MPC · JPL
357541	2004 RO_{278}	—	September 15, 2004	Kitt Peak	Spacewatch	·	3.9 km	MPC · JPL
357542	2004 RP_{300}	—	September 11, 2004	Kitt Peak	Spacewatch	·	4.6 km	MPC · JPL
357543	2004 RV_{317}	—	August 22, 2004	Kitt Peak	Spacewatch	·	970 m	MPC · JPL
357544	2004 RN_{322}	—	September 13, 2004	Socorro	LINEAR	·	860 m	MPC · JPL
357545	2004 RV_{324}	—	September 13, 2004	Socorro	LINEAR	·	1.0 km	MPC · JPL
357546 Edwardhalbach	2004 RA_{339}	Edwardhalbach	September 15, 2004	Sonoita	W. R. Cooney Jr., Gross, J.	EOS	2.2 km	MPC · JPL
357547	2004 ST_{20}	—	September 17, 2004	Desert Eagle	W. K. Y. Yeung	·	3.7 km	MPC · JPL
357548	2004 SP_{32}	—	September 17, 2004	Socorro	LINEAR	NYS	1.1 km	MPC · JPL
357549	2004 SG_{34}	—	September 17, 2004	Kitt Peak	Spacewatch	·	2.9 km	MPC · JPL
357550	2004 SW_{43}	—	September 18, 2004	Socorro	LINEAR	·	3.5 km	MPC · JPL
357551	2004 SO_{44}	—	September 18, 2004	Socorro	LINEAR	·	1.2 km	MPC · JPL
357552	2004 SR_{46}	—	September 10, 2004	Socorro	LINEAR	·	850 m	MPC · JPL
357553	2004 SH_{50}	—	September 22, 2004	Socorro	LINEAR	·	5.0 km	MPC · JPL
357554	2004 SR_{58}	—	September 18, 2004	Siding Spring	SSS	H	700 m	MPC · JPL
357555	2004 TS_{26}	—	September 18, 2004	Socorro	LINEAR	·	4.0 km	MPC · JPL
357556	2004 TU_{29}	—	October 4, 2004	Kitt Peak	Spacewatch	·	1.1 km	MPC · JPL
357557	2004 TM_{31}	—	October 4, 2004	Kitt Peak	Spacewatch	·	710 m	MPC · JPL
357558	2004 TE_{32}	—	September 22, 2004	Kitt Peak	Spacewatch	·	3.7 km	MPC · JPL
357559	2004 TB_{34}	—	October 4, 2004	Kitt Peak	Spacewatch	·	940 m	MPC · JPL
357560	2004 TQ_{43}	—	October 4, 2004	Kitt Peak	Spacewatch	·	1.1 km	MPC · JPL
357561	2004 TR_{44}	—	October 4, 2004	Kitt Peak	Spacewatch	·	1.1 km	MPC · JPL
357562	2004 TE_{63}	—	October 5, 2004	Kitt Peak	Spacewatch	·	3.0 km	MPC · JPL
357563	2004 TF_{79}	—	September 17, 2004	Socorro	LINEAR	·	1.1 km	MPC · JPL
357564	2004 TC_{81}	—	September 24, 2004	Kitt Peak	Spacewatch	·	1.8 km	MPC · JPL
357565	2004 TL_{85}	—	October 5, 2004	Kitt Peak	Spacewatch	·	680 m	MPC · JPL
357566	2004 TQ_{88}	—	October 5, 2004	Kitt Peak	Spacewatch	·	900 m	MPC · JPL
357567	2004 TC_{95}	—	September 17, 2004	Kitt Peak	Spacewatch	·	1.1 km	MPC · JPL
357568	2004 TL_{134}	—	October 7, 2004	Palomar	NEAT	·	1.7 km	MPC · JPL
357569	2004 TC_{136}	—	October 8, 2004	Anderson Mesa	LONEOS	·	1.0 km	MPC · JPL
357570	2004 TZ_{142}	—	October 4, 2004	Kitt Peak	Spacewatch	·	860 m	MPC · JPL
357571	2004 TD_{145}	—	October 4, 2004	Kitt Peak	Spacewatch	·	1.5 km	MPC · JPL
357572	2004 TF_{153}	—	October 6, 2004	Kitt Peak	Spacewatch	·	1.1 km	MPC · JPL
357573	2004 TZ_{164}	—	October 7, 2004	Kitt Peak	Spacewatch	·	4.2 km	MPC · JPL
357574	2004 TJ_{167}	—	October 7, 2004	Kitt Peak	Spacewatch	·	810 m	MPC · JPL
357575	2004 TX_{170}	—	October 7, 2004	Socorro	LINEAR	·	910 m	MPC · JPL
357576	2004 TH_{174}	—	October 9, 2004	Socorro	LINEAR	·	3.9 km	MPC · JPL
357577	2004 TP_{231}	—	October 8, 2004	Kitt Peak	Spacewatch	·	1.3 km	MPC · JPL
357578	2004 TJ_{232}	—	October 8, 2004	Kitt Peak	Spacewatch	·	4.1 km	MPC · JPL
357579	2004 TG_{241}	—	September 10, 2004	Socorro	LINEAR	·	1.1 km	MPC · JPL
357580	2004 TS_{243}	—	October 6, 2004	Kitt Peak	Spacewatch	TIR	3.9 km	MPC · JPL
357581	2004 TF_{251}	—	October 9, 2004	Kitt Peak	Spacewatch	·	3.0 km	MPC · JPL
357582	2004 TV_{284}	—	October 8, 2004	Kitt Peak	Spacewatch	·	3.5 km	MPC · JPL
357583	2004 TV_{301}	—	October 8, 2004	Anderson Mesa	LONEOS	V	850 m	MPC · JPL
357584	2004 TS_{347}	—	October 15, 2004	Socorro	LINEAR	PHO	3.6 km	MPC · JPL
357585	2004 VB_{8}	—	November 3, 2004	Kitt Peak	Spacewatch	·	1.6 km	MPC · JPL
357586	2004 VH_{10}	—	November 3, 2004	Palomar	NEAT	MAS	800 m	MPC · JPL
357587	2004 VF_{18}	—	November 4, 2004	Kitt Peak	Spacewatch	·	1.2 km	MPC · JPL
357588	2004 VS_{26}	—	November 4, 2004	Catalina	CSS	·	1.2 km	MPC · JPL
357589	2004 VK_{55}	—	November 10, 2004	Socorro	LINEAR	H	640 m	MPC · JPL
357590	2004 VS_{57}	—	October 7, 2004	Kitt Peak	Spacewatch	·	1.2 km	MPC · JPL
357591	2004 VD_{76}	—	November 12, 2004	Catalina	CSS	·	1.1 km	MPC · JPL
357592	2004 VX_{76}	—	November 12, 2004	Catalina	CSS	·	1.2 km	MPC · JPL
357593	2004 XM_{20}	—	December 8, 2004	Socorro	LINEAR	·	1.3 km	MPC · JPL
357594	2004 XL_{35}	—	December 12, 2004	Socorro	LINEAR	APO · PHA	420 m	MPC · JPL
357595	2004 XO_{43}	—	December 10, 2004	Socorro	LINEAR	·	1.3 km	MPC · JPL
357596	2004 XX_{75}	—	December 10, 2004	Kitt Peak	Spacewatch	·	1.3 km	MPC · JPL
357597	2004 XM_{80}	—	December 10, 2004	Socorro	LINEAR	NYS	1.4 km	MPC · JPL
357598	2004 XW_{104}	—	December 10, 2004	Anderson Mesa	LONEOS	·	1.9 km	MPC · JPL
357599	2005 AA	—	January 2, 2005	Begues	Manteca, J., Munoz, J.	MAS	1.1 km	MPC · JPL
357600	2005 AN_{2}	—	January 6, 2005	Catalina	CSS	NYS	1.4 km	MPC · JPL

== 357601–357700 ==
back to top

Designation			Discovery			Properties		Ref
Permanent	Provisional	Named after	Date	Site	Discoverer(s)	Category	Diam.	Ref
357601	2005 AZ_{10}	—	January 6, 2005	Socorro	LINEAR	·	1.4 km	MPC · JPL
357602	2005 AN_{36}	—	January 13, 2005	Socorro	LINEAR	·	1.5 km	MPC · JPL
357603	2005 AJ_{62}	—	January 15, 2005	Anderson Mesa	LONEOS	H	790 m	MPC · JPL
357604	2005 AZ_{76}	—	January 15, 2005	Kitt Peak	Spacewatch	EUN	1.2 km	MPC · JPL
357605	2005 BK_{1}	—	January 16, 2005	Socorro	LINEAR	·	4.3 km	MPC · JPL
357606	2005 BR_{13}	—	January 17, 2005	Kitt Peak	Spacewatch	·	1.6 km	MPC · JPL
357607	2005 BD_{21}	—	January 16, 2005	Socorro	LINEAR	·	1.3 km	MPC · JPL
357608	2005 BW_{23}	—	January 17, 2005	Kitt Peak	Spacewatch	·	1.2 km	MPC · JPL
357609	2005 BF_{29}	—	January 18, 2005	Mayhill	Wolff, U.	·	960 m	MPC · JPL
357610	2005 CU_{18}	—	February 2, 2005	Catalina	CSS	PHO	1.2 km	MPC · JPL
357611	2005 CC_{20}	—	February 2, 2005	Kitt Peak	Spacewatch	H	580 m	MPC · JPL
357612	2005 CY_{37}	—	February 3, 2005	Socorro	LINEAR	H	600 m	MPC · JPL
357613	2005 CM_{60}	—	February 4, 2005	Kitt Peak	Spacewatch	MAS	800 m	MPC · JPL
357614	2005 CT_{61}	—	February 9, 2005	Socorro	LINEAR	H	710 m	MPC · JPL
357615	2005 EG_{2}	—	March 3, 2005	Catalina	CSS	H	780 m	MPC · JPL
357616	2005 EA_{15}	—	March 3, 2005	Kitt Peak	Spacewatch	HNS	1.5 km	MPC · JPL
357617	2005 EY_{15}	—	March 3, 2005	Kitt Peak	Spacewatch	H	700 m	MPC · JPL
357618	2005 EM_{30}	—	March 4, 2005	Socorro	LINEAR	APO	550 m	MPC · JPL
357619	2005 EZ_{70}	—	March 8, 2005	Goodricke-Pigott	R. A. Tucker	H	750 m	MPC · JPL
357620	2005 EA_{77}	—	March 3, 2005	Kitt Peak	Spacewatch	·	1.1 km	MPC · JPL
357621	2005 EG_{94}	—	March 8, 2005	Kitt Peak	Spacewatch	APO	610 m	MPC · JPL
357622	2005 EY_{95}	—	March 11, 2005	Catalina	CSS	APO · PHA	310 m	MPC · JPL
357623	2005 EB_{140}	—	March 9, 2005	Socorro	LINEAR	·	1.8 km	MPC · JPL
357624	2005 EK_{153}	—	March 8, 2005	Catalina	CSS	H	760 m	MPC · JPL
357625	2005 EZ_{187}	—	March 10, 2005	Mount Lemmon	Mount Lemmon Survey	·	1.4 km	MPC · JPL
357626	2005 EE_{199}	—	March 11, 2005	Mount Lemmon	Mount Lemmon Survey	H	650 m	MPC · JPL
357627	2005 ET_{204}	—	March 11, 2005	Mount Lemmon	Mount Lemmon Survey	·	2.2 km	MPC · JPL
357628	2005 EH_{224}	—	March 9, 2005	Socorro	LINEAR	·	1.2 km	MPC · JPL
357629	2005 EL_{250}	—	March 11, 2005	Anderson Mesa	LONEOS	H	680 m	MPC · JPL
357630	2005 EH_{257}	—	March 11, 2005	Mount Lemmon	Mount Lemmon Survey	·	1.2 km	MPC · JPL
357631	2005 EU_{280}	—	March 10, 2005	Anderson Mesa	LONEOS	·	1.3 km	MPC · JPL
357632	2005 ET_{288}	—	March 8, 2005	Mount Lemmon	Mount Lemmon Survey	·	1.6 km	MPC · JPL
357633	2005 GP_{6}	—	April 1, 2005	Kitt Peak	Spacewatch	·	1.4 km	MPC · JPL
357634	2005 GT_{6}	—	April 1, 2005	Kitt Peak	Spacewatch	·	1.8 km	MPC · JPL
357635	2005 GW_{8}	—	April 2, 2005	Mount Lemmon	Mount Lemmon Survey	·	1.8 km	MPC · JPL
357636	2005 GF_{36}	—	April 2, 2005	Mount Lemmon	Mount Lemmon Survey	·	870 m	MPC · JPL
357637	2005 GM_{52}	—	April 2, 2005	Mount Lemmon	Mount Lemmon Survey	slow	2.3 km	MPC · JPL
357638	2005 GD_{94}	—	April 6, 2005	Mount Lemmon	Mount Lemmon Survey	·	2.0 km	MPC · JPL
357639	2005 GM_{98}	—	April 7, 2005	Kitt Peak	Spacewatch	(194)	1.5 km	MPC · JPL
357640	2005 GZ_{104}	—	April 10, 2005	Kitt Peak	Spacewatch	·	1.4 km	MPC · JPL
357641	2005 GY_{115}	—	April 11, 2005	Kitt Peak	Spacewatch	·	1.1 km	MPC · JPL
357642	2005 GT_{124}	—	April 9, 2005	Catalina	CSS	·	1.7 km	MPC · JPL
357643	2005 GG_{126}	—	April 11, 2005	Anderson Mesa	LONEOS	·	1.6 km	MPC · JPL
357644	2005 GU_{128}	—	April 1, 2005	Catalina	CSS	H	760 m	MPC · JPL
357645	2005 GT_{130}	—	April 8, 2005	Socorro	LINEAR	·	1.7 km	MPC · JPL
357646	2005 GK_{136}	—	April 10, 2005	Kitt Peak	Spacewatch	H	530 m	MPC · JPL
357647	2005 GE_{154}	—	April 14, 2005	Kitt Peak	Spacewatch	·	1.2 km	MPC · JPL
357648	2005 GF_{154}	—	April 15, 2005	Reedy Creek	J. Broughton	·	3.1 km	MPC · JPL
357649	2005 GQ_{154}	—	March 18, 2005	Catalina	CSS	·	3.0 km	MPC · JPL
357650	2005 GJ_{172}	—	April 14, 2005	Kitt Peak	Spacewatch	·	1.2 km	MPC · JPL
357651	2005 GT_{204}	—	April 10, 2005	Mount Lemmon	Mount Lemmon Survey	·	2.2 km	MPC · JPL
357652	2005 HL_{10}	—	April 16, 2005	Kitt Peak	Spacewatch	·	1.3 km	MPC · JPL
357653	2005 JK_{19}	—	May 4, 2005	Kitt Peak	Spacewatch	·	1.6 km	MPC · JPL
357654	2005 JZ_{19}	—	May 4, 2005	Catalina	CSS	·	1.8 km	MPC · JPL
357655	2005 JL_{58}	—	May 7, 2005	Catalina	CSS	·	1.9 km	MPC · JPL
357656	2005 JZ_{60}	—	May 8, 2005	Kitt Peak	Spacewatch	L4	10 km	MPC · JPL
357657	2005 JD_{68}	—	May 4, 2005	Siding Spring	SSS	·	1.2 km	MPC · JPL
357658	2005 JX_{68}	—	May 6, 2005	Socorro	LINEAR	·	1.7 km	MPC · JPL
357659	2005 JT_{76}	—	May 9, 2005	Mount Lemmon	Mount Lemmon Survey	·	1.2 km	MPC · JPL
357660	2005 JS_{86}	—	May 8, 2005	Kitt Peak	Spacewatch	·	1.7 km	MPC · JPL
357661	2005 JG_{94}	—	May 6, 2005	Anderson Mesa	LONEOS	·	2.2 km	MPC · JPL
357662	2005 JZ_{102}	—	May 9, 2005	Catalina	CSS	·	1.3 km	MPC · JPL
357663	2005 JW_{108}	—	May 8, 2005	Kitt Peak	Spacewatch	BAR	1.3 km	MPC · JPL
357664	2005 JG_{109}	—	May 7, 2005	Catalina	CSS	·	3.0 km	MPC · JPL
357665	2005 JV_{109}	—	May 7, 2005	Catalina	CSS	·	1.2 km	MPC · JPL
357666	2005 JQ_{119}	—	May 10, 2005	Kitt Peak	Spacewatch	·	1.4 km	MPC · JPL
357667	2005 JX_{120}	—	May 10, 2005	Kitt Peak	Spacewatch	·	1.5 km	MPC · JPL
357668	2005 JS_{128}	—	May 13, 2005	Catalina	CSS	·	1.2 km	MPC · JPL
357669	2005 JW_{132}	—	May 14, 2005	Kitt Peak	Spacewatch	·	1.2 km	MPC · JPL
357670	2005 JU_{133}	—	May 14, 2005	Kitt Peak	Spacewatch	EUN	1.7 km	MPC · JPL
357671	2005 JL_{147}	—	May 15, 2005	Palomar	NEAT	·	2.1 km	MPC · JPL
357672	2005 JN_{150}	—	May 3, 2005	Kitt Peak	Spacewatch	MAR	1.3 km	MPC · JPL
357673	2005 JW_{156}	—	May 4, 2005	Kitt Peak	Spacewatch	ADE	2.4 km	MPC · JPL
357674	2005 JB_{157}	—	May 4, 2005	Catalina	CSS	H	730 m	MPC · JPL
357675	2005 JB_{164}	—	May 9, 2005	Catalina	CSS	ADE	2.2 km	MPC · JPL
357676	2005 JJ_{175}	—	May 10, 2005	Kitt Peak	Spacewatch	EUN	1.4 km	MPC · JPL
357677	2005 LS_{1}	—	June 1, 2005	Mount Lemmon	Mount Lemmon Survey	·	2.4 km	MPC · JPL
357678	2005 LG_{3}	—	June 2, 2005	Socorro	LINEAR	·	4.2 km	MPC · JPL
357679	2005 LV_{49}	—	June 11, 2005	Kitt Peak	Spacewatch	·	1.5 km	MPC · JPL
357680	2005 MN_{17}	—	June 27, 2005	Kitt Peak	Spacewatch	JUN	1.1 km	MPC · JPL
357681	2005 MR_{19}	—	June 29, 2005	Kitt Peak	Spacewatch	·	2.5 km	MPC · JPL
357682	2005 MA_{28}	—	June 29, 2005	Kitt Peak	Spacewatch	·	1.8 km	MPC · JPL
357683	2005 MM_{35}	—	June 30, 2005	Kitt Peak	Spacewatch	·	2.3 km	MPC · JPL
357684	2005 MY_{35}	—	June 30, 2005	Kitt Peak	Spacewatch	·	2.3 km	MPC · JPL
357685	2005 NY_{4}	—	July 3, 2005	Mount Lemmon	Mount Lemmon Survey	·	2.0 km	MPC · JPL
357686	2005 NQ_{9}	—	July 1, 2005	Kitt Peak	Spacewatch	MIS	2.5 km	MPC · JPL
357687	2005 ND_{11}	—	July 3, 2005	Mount Lemmon	Mount Lemmon Survey	·	2.0 km	MPC · JPL
357688	2005 NJ_{25}	—	February 1, 2003	Kitt Peak	Spacewatch	EOS	1.9 km	MPC · JPL
357689	2005 NZ_{25}	—	July 4, 2005	Kitt Peak	Spacewatch	·	2.2 km	MPC · JPL
357690	2005 NA_{27}	—	June 15, 2005	Mount Lemmon	Mount Lemmon Survey	·	2.0 km	MPC · JPL
357691	2005 NR_{56}	—	July 5, 2005	Mount Lemmon	Mount Lemmon Survey	AGN	1.1 km	MPC · JPL
357692	2005 NE_{64}	—	July 1, 2005	Kitt Peak	Spacewatch	·	2.0 km	MPC · JPL
357693	2005 NF_{68}	—	July 3, 2005	Palomar	NEAT	·	2.4 km	MPC · JPL
357694	2005 OL_{17}	—	July 30, 2005	Palomar	NEAT	EUN	1.6 km	MPC · JPL
357695	2005 OO_{17}	—	July 30, 2005	Palomar	NEAT	EOS	1.9 km	MPC · JPL
357696	2005 OQ_{21}	—	July 28, 2005	Palomar	NEAT	JUN	1.3 km	MPC · JPL
357697	2005 OF_{25}	—	July 31, 2005	Palomar	NEAT	JUN	1.4 km	MPC · JPL
357698	2005 OP_{31}	—	July 28, 2005	Palomar	NEAT	AGN	1.2 km	MPC · JPL
357699	2005 PQ_{2}	—	August 2, 2005	Socorro	LINEAR	·	3.4 km	MPC · JPL
357700	2005 PY_{10}	—	August 4, 2005	Palomar	NEAT	·	2.5 km	MPC · JPL

== 357701–357800 ==
back to top

Designation			Discovery			Properties		Ref
Permanent	Provisional	Named after	Date	Site	Discoverer(s)	Category	Diam.	Ref
357701	2005 PT_{15}	—	August 4, 2005	Palomar	NEAT	NAE	3.2 km	MPC · JPL
357702	2005 PX_{18}	—	August 6, 2005	Socorro	LINEAR	·	1.7 km	MPC · JPL
357703	2005 PT_{23}	—	August 5, 2005	Palomar	NEAT	·	2.6 km	MPC · JPL
357704	2005 PF_{29}	—	August 8, 2005	Siding Spring	SSS	·	2.0 km	MPC · JPL
357705	2005 QF_{4}	—	August 24, 2005	Palomar	NEAT	·	2.9 km	MPC · JPL
357706	2005 QX_{15}	—	August 25, 2005	Palomar	NEAT	·	1.7 km	MPC · JPL
357707	2005 QO_{18}	—	August 25, 2005	Palomar	NEAT	·	2.3 km	MPC · JPL
357708	2005 QH_{32}	—	July 30, 2005	Palomar	NEAT	·	1.5 km	MPC · JPL
357709	2005 QM_{34}	—	August 25, 2005	Palomar	NEAT	EOS	2.0 km	MPC · JPL
357710	2005 QS_{34}	—	August 25, 2005	Palomar	NEAT	·	2.1 km	MPC · JPL
357711	2005 QU_{40}	—	August 26, 2005	Palomar	NEAT	·	2.5 km	MPC · JPL
357712	2005 QB_{41}	—	August 26, 2005	Anderson Mesa	LONEOS	·	2.5 km	MPC · JPL
357713	2005 QN_{43}	—	August 26, 2005	Palomar	NEAT	·	2.5 km	MPC · JPL
357714	2005 QS_{52}	—	August 27, 2005	Kitt Peak	Spacewatch	(32418)	2.3 km	MPC · JPL
357715	2005 QO_{62}	—	August 26, 2005	Palomar	NEAT	·	1.9 km	MPC · JPL
357716	2005 QG_{63}	—	August 26, 2005	Palomar	NEAT	EOS	2.1 km	MPC · JPL
357717	2005 QO_{78}	—	August 25, 2005	Palomar	NEAT	·	4.5 km	MPC · JPL
357718	2005 QK_{81}	—	August 29, 2005	Kitt Peak	Spacewatch	·	2.4 km	MPC · JPL
357719	2005 QJ_{111}	—	September 1, 2005	Kitt Peak	Spacewatch	EOS	1.7 km	MPC · JPL
357720	2005 QZ_{116}	—	August 28, 2005	Kitt Peak	Spacewatch	KOR	1.5 km	MPC · JPL
357721	2005 QU_{126}	—	August 1, 1995	Kitt Peak	Spacewatch	·	2.5 km	MPC · JPL
357722	2005 QS_{127}	—	August 28, 2005	Kitt Peak	Spacewatch	·	650 m	MPC · JPL
357723	2005 QB_{133}	—	August 28, 2005	Kitt Peak	Spacewatch	·	2.1 km	MPC · JPL
357724	2005 QN_{134}	—	August 28, 2005	Kitt Peak	Spacewatch	·	2.4 km	MPC · JPL
357725	2005 QW_{136}	—	August 28, 2005	Kitt Peak	Spacewatch	·	1.8 km	MPC · JPL
357726	2005 QH_{137}	—	August 28, 2005	Kitt Peak	Spacewatch	·	2.1 km	MPC · JPL
357727	2005 QB_{138}	—	August 28, 2005	Kitt Peak	Spacewatch	·	2.4 km	MPC · JPL
357728	2005 QB_{139}	—	August 28, 2005	Kitt Peak	Spacewatch	·	2.1 km	MPC · JPL
357729	2005 QW_{172}	—	August 29, 2005	Palomar	NEAT	·	3.2 km	MPC · JPL
357730	2005 QC_{181}	—	August 30, 2005	Palomar	NEAT	EOS	2.3 km	MPC · JPL
357731	2005 QO_{189}	—	August 28, 2005	Kitt Peak	Spacewatch	·	2.5 km	MPC · JPL
357732	2005 RO_{5}	—	September 1, 2005	Kitt Peak	Spacewatch	·	3.1 km	MPC · JPL
357733	2005 RS_{10}	—	September 8, 2005	Socorro	LINEAR	·	3.0 km	MPC · JPL
357734	2005 RZ_{18}	—	September 1, 2005	Kitt Peak	Spacewatch	·	2.2 km	MPC · JPL
357735	2005 RR_{27}	—	September 10, 2005	Anderson Mesa	LONEOS	THB	4.4 km	MPC · JPL
357736	2005 RJ_{40}	—	September 6, 2005	Anderson Mesa	LONEOS	·	2.8 km	MPC · JPL
357737	2005 RQ_{42}	—	August 31, 2005	Kitt Peak	Spacewatch	T_{j} (2.99)	3.6 km	MPC · JPL
357738	2005 RJ_{47}	—	September 13, 2005	Apache Point	A. C. Becker	·	1.4 km	MPC · JPL
357739	2005 RQ_{47}	—	September 13, 2005	Apache Point	A. C. Becker	·	2.3 km	MPC · JPL
357740	2005 SR_{7}	—	September 24, 2005	Kitt Peak	Spacewatch	·	2.8 km	MPC · JPL
357741	2005 SO_{14}	—	September 25, 2005	Kitt Peak	Spacewatch	THM	2.7 km	MPC · JPL
357742	2005 SU_{15}	—	September 26, 2005	Kitt Peak	Spacewatch	·	2.0 km	MPC · JPL
357743	2005 SS_{31}	—	September 23, 2005	Kitt Peak	Spacewatch	EOS	3.8 km	MPC · JPL
357744	2005 SN_{33}	—	September 23, 2005	Kitt Peak	Spacewatch	·	4.5 km	MPC · JPL
357745	2005 SJ_{50}	—	September 24, 2005	Kitt Peak	Spacewatch	·	2.8 km	MPC · JPL
357746	2005 SV_{51}	—	September 24, 2005	Kitt Peak	Spacewatch	·	3.5 km	MPC · JPL
357747	2005 SW_{53}	—	September 25, 2005	Kitt Peak	Spacewatch	·	4.4 km	MPC · JPL
357748	2005 SP_{58}	—	September 26, 2005	Kitt Peak	Spacewatch	·	2.6 km	MPC · JPL
357749	2005 SD_{64}	—	September 26, 2005	Kitt Peak	Spacewatch	EOS	1.7 km	MPC · JPL
357750	2005 SK_{71}	—	September 23, 2005	Kitt Peak	Spacewatch	·	1.8 km	MPC · JPL
357751	2005 SW_{73}	—	September 23, 2005	Catalina	CSS	·	4.2 km	MPC · JPL
357752	2005 SQ_{74}	—	September 24, 2005	Kitt Peak	Spacewatch	EOS	1.8 km	MPC · JPL
357753	2005 SD_{80}	—	September 24, 2005	Kitt Peak	Spacewatch	KOR	1.5 km	MPC · JPL
357754	2005 SV_{85}	—	September 24, 2005	Kitt Peak	Spacewatch	·	2.4 km	MPC · JPL
357755	2005 SZ_{90}	—	September 24, 2005	Kitt Peak	Spacewatch	·	3.5 km	MPC · JPL
357756	2005 SY_{91}	—	September 24, 2005	Kitt Peak	Spacewatch	·	3.5 km	MPC · JPL
357757	2005 SR_{92}	—	September 24, 2005	Kitt Peak	Spacewatch	EOS	2.2 km	MPC · JPL
357758	2005 SJ_{100}	—	September 25, 2005	Kitt Peak	Spacewatch	·	3.3 km	MPC · JPL
357759	2005 SJ_{108}	—	September 26, 2005	Kitt Peak	Spacewatch	·	3.0 km	MPC · JPL
357760	2005 SB_{109}	—	September 26, 2005	Kitt Peak	Spacewatch	·	3.8 km	MPC · JPL
357761	2005 SR_{109}	—	September 26, 2005	Kitt Peak	Spacewatch	·	2.5 km	MPC · JPL
357762	2005 SM_{110}	—	September 26, 2005	Kitt Peak	Spacewatch	·	2.9 km	MPC · JPL
357763	2005 SF_{119}	—	September 28, 2005	Palomar	NEAT	·	3.8 km	MPC · JPL
357764	2005 SL_{125}	—	September 29, 2005	Palomar	NEAT	·	3.2 km	MPC · JPL
357765	2005 SC_{128}	—	September 29, 2005	Mount Lemmon	Mount Lemmon Survey	·	2.8 km	MPC · JPL
357766	2005 SS_{129}	—	September 29, 2005	Mount Lemmon	Mount Lemmon Survey	·	4.3 km	MPC · JPL
357767	2005 SS_{130}	—	September 29, 2005	Mount Lemmon	Mount Lemmon Survey	·	4.1 km	MPC · JPL
357768	2005 ST_{147}	—	September 25, 2005	Kitt Peak	Spacewatch	·	2.8 km	MPC · JPL
357769	2005 SW_{159}	—	September 26, 2005	Palomar	NEAT	·	4.9 km	MPC · JPL
357770	2005 SE_{160}	—	September 27, 2005	Kitt Peak	Spacewatch	TIR	2.4 km	MPC · JPL
357771	2005 SM_{170}	—	September 29, 2005	Kitt Peak	Spacewatch	·	2.7 km	MPC · JPL
357772	2005 SN_{176}	—	September 29, 2005	Kitt Peak	Spacewatch	·	2.0 km	MPC · JPL
357773	2005 SU_{182}	—	September 29, 2005	Kitt Peak	Spacewatch	·	3.3 km	MPC · JPL
357774	2005 SJ_{183}	—	September 29, 2005	Kitt Peak	Spacewatch	·	3.5 km	MPC · JPL
357775	2005 SH_{194}	—	September 29, 2005	Kitt Peak	Spacewatch	EOS	2.2 km	MPC · JPL
357776	2005 SX_{199}	—	September 30, 2005	Mount Lemmon	Mount Lemmon Survey	·	2.8 km	MPC · JPL
357777	2005 SS_{211}	—	September 30, 2005	Mount Lemmon	Mount Lemmon Survey	·	2.7 km	MPC · JPL
357778	2005 SJ_{212}	—	September 30, 2005	Mount Lemmon	Mount Lemmon Survey	·	2.8 km	MPC · JPL
357779	2005 SS_{230}	—	September 30, 2005	Mount Lemmon	Mount Lemmon Survey	EOS	2.4 km	MPC · JPL
357780	2005 SQ_{231}	—	September 30, 2005	Mount Lemmon	Mount Lemmon Survey	·	3.9 km	MPC · JPL
357781	2005 SB_{254}	—	September 22, 2005	Palomar	NEAT	·	1.7 km	MPC · JPL
357782	2005 SJ_{257}	—	September 22, 2005	Palomar	NEAT	·	2.6 km	MPC · JPL
357783	2005 SE_{258}	—	September 23, 2005	Catalina	CSS	·	1.8 km	MPC · JPL
357784	2005 ST_{279}	—	September 23, 2005	Kitt Peak	Spacewatch	·	540 m	MPC · JPL
357785	2005 SA_{282}	—	September 24, 2005	Apache Point	A. C. Becker	·	3.0 km	MPC · JPL
357786	2005 SR_{283}	—	February 17, 2007	Catalina	CSS	TIR	3.3 km	MPC · JPL
357787	2005 SX_{284}	—	September 25, 2005	Apache Point	A. C. Becker	EOS	2.1 km	MPC · JPL
357788	2005 ST_{292}	—	September 23, 2005	Kitt Peak	Spacewatch	·	2.0 km	MPC · JPL
357789	2005 SF_{293}	—	September 30, 2005	Anderson Mesa	LONEOS	·	1.9 km	MPC · JPL
357790	2005 TX_{2}	—	October 1, 2005	Catalina	CSS	·	2.4 km	MPC · JPL
357791	2005 TE_{6}	—	October 1, 2005	Catalina	CSS	·	4.4 km	MPC · JPL
357792	2005 TX_{24}	—	October 1, 2005	Mount Lemmon	Mount Lemmon Survey	·	2.7 km	MPC · JPL
357793	2005 TY_{29}	—	October 4, 2005	Palomar	NEAT	EUP	3.9 km	MPC · JPL
357794	2005 TO_{32}	—	October 1, 2005	Kitt Peak	Spacewatch	EOS	1.7 km	MPC · JPL
357795	2005 TP_{56}	—	October 1, 2005	Catalina	CSS	·	3.1 km	MPC · JPL
357796	2005 TE_{59}	—	October 1, 2005	Mount Lemmon	Mount Lemmon Survey	HYG	3.1 km	MPC · JPL
357797	2005 TP_{60}	—	October 3, 2005	Kitt Peak	Spacewatch	·	2.8 km	MPC · JPL
357798	2005 TW_{78}	—	October 7, 2005	Catalina	CSS	·	5.8 km	MPC · JPL
357799	2005 TW_{85}	—	October 3, 2005	Kitt Peak	Spacewatch	EOS	2.2 km	MPC · JPL
357800	2005 TG_{86}	—	October 4, 2005	Mount Lemmon	Mount Lemmon Survey	·	3.0 km	MPC · JPL

== 357801–357900 ==
back to top

Designation			Discovery			Properties		Ref
Permanent	Provisional	Named after	Date	Site	Discoverer(s)	Category	Diam.	Ref
357801	2005 TV_{88}	—	October 5, 2005	Mount Lemmon	Mount Lemmon Survey	·	2.8 km	MPC · JPL
357802	2005 TM_{98}	—	October 6, 2005	Anderson Mesa	LONEOS	TIR	4.3 km	MPC · JPL
357803	2005 TP_{129}	—	October 7, 2005	Kitt Peak	Spacewatch	·	1.7 km	MPC · JPL
357804	2005 TG_{130}	—	October 7, 2005	Kitt Peak	Spacewatch	·	2.9 km	MPC · JPL
357805	2005 TJ_{136}	—	October 6, 2005	Kitt Peak	Spacewatch	·	1.9 km	MPC · JPL
357806	2005 TW_{143}	—	October 8, 2005	Kitt Peak	Spacewatch	·	1.9 km	MPC · JPL
357807	2005 TB_{155}	—	October 9, 2005	Kitt Peak	Spacewatch	·	3.5 km	MPC · JPL
357808	2005 TM_{157}	—	October 9, 2005	Kitt Peak	Spacewatch	·	2.1 km	MPC · JPL
357809	2005 TS_{161}	—	October 9, 2005	Kitt Peak	Spacewatch	·	3.3 km	MPC · JPL
357810	2005 TJ_{162}	—	October 9, 2005	Kitt Peak	Spacewatch	·	1.9 km	MPC · JPL
357811	2005 TP_{164}	—	October 9, 2005	Kitt Peak	Spacewatch	·	590 m	MPC · JPL
357812	2005 TM_{166}	—	October 9, 2005	Kitt Peak	Spacewatch	·	2.8 km	MPC · JPL
357813	2005 TD_{172}	—	October 10, 2005	Kitt Peak	Spacewatch	·	4.4 km	MPC · JPL
357814	2005 TZ_{181}	—	October 2, 2005	Mount Lemmon	Mount Lemmon Survey	·	2.5 km	MPC · JPL
357815	2005 TH_{187}	—	October 6, 2005	Kitt Peak	Spacewatch	·	2.0 km	MPC · JPL
357816	2005 TC_{191}	—	October 1, 2005	Kitt Peak	Spacewatch	·	2.9 km	MPC · JPL
357817	2005 TJ_{192}	—	October 10, 2005	Kitt Peak	Spacewatch	·	2.2 km	MPC · JPL
357818	2005 TD_{194}	—	October 2, 2005	Mount Lemmon	Mount Lemmon Survey	·	2.8 km	MPC · JPL
357819	2005 UY_{23}	—	October 23, 2005	Kitt Peak	Spacewatch	·	2.7 km	MPC · JPL
357820	2005 UC_{27}	—	October 23, 2005	Catalina	CSS	HYG	2.8 km	MPC · JPL
357821	2005 UP_{27}	—	October 23, 2005	Catalina	CSS	·	3.9 km	MPC · JPL
357822	2005 UQ_{29}	—	October 23, 2005	Catalina	CSS	·	3.3 km	MPC · JPL
357823	2005 UT_{40}	—	October 24, 2005	Kitt Peak	Spacewatch	·	3.4 km	MPC · JPL
357824	2005 UL_{50}	—	October 23, 2005	Catalina	CSS	·	4.6 km	MPC · JPL
357825	2005 UA_{55}	—	October 23, 2005	Catalina	CSS	·	4.4 km	MPC · JPL
357826	2005 UR_{56}	—	October 24, 2005	Anderson Mesa	LONEOS	EOS	2.3 km	MPC · JPL
357827	2005 UA_{64}	—	October 25, 2005	Mount Lemmon	Mount Lemmon Survey	·	2.5 km	MPC · JPL
357828	2005 UV_{82}	—	October 22, 2005	Kitt Peak	Spacewatch	·	2.9 km	MPC · JPL
357829	2005 UQ_{86}	—	October 22, 2005	Kitt Peak	Spacewatch	THM	2.4 km	MPC · JPL
357830	2005 UC_{94}	—	October 22, 2005	Kitt Peak	Spacewatch	·	2.7 km	MPC · JPL
357831	2005 UJ_{107}	—	October 22, 2005	Kitt Peak	Spacewatch	·	690 m	MPC · JPL
357832	2005 UU_{107}	—	October 22, 2005	Kitt Peak	Spacewatch	·	3.1 km	MPC · JPL
357833	2005 UA_{110}	—	October 22, 2005	Kitt Peak	Spacewatch	·	680 m	MPC · JPL
357834	2005 UE_{124}	—	October 24, 2005	Kitt Peak	Spacewatch	·	920 m	MPC · JPL
357835	2005 UF_{127}	—	October 24, 2005	Kitt Peak	Spacewatch	THM	2.6 km	MPC · JPL
357836	2005 UH_{131}	—	October 24, 2005	Kitt Peak	Spacewatch	·	3.3 km	MPC · JPL
357837	2005 UQ_{135}	—	September 27, 2005	Kitt Peak	Spacewatch	·	2.0 km	MPC · JPL
357838	2005 UY_{135}	—	October 25, 2005	Mount Lemmon	Mount Lemmon Survey	·	1.7 km	MPC · JPL
357839	2005 UJ_{141}	—	October 25, 2005	Catalina	CSS	EOS	2.5 km	MPC · JPL
357840	2005 UH_{147}	—	October 26, 2005	Kitt Peak	Spacewatch	·	3.6 km	MPC · JPL
357841	2005 UZ_{150}	—	October 26, 2005	Kitt Peak	Spacewatch	·	3.2 km	MPC · JPL
357842	2005 UH_{152}	—	October 26, 2005	Kitt Peak	Spacewatch	·	2.2 km	MPC · JPL
357843	2005 UA_{165}	—	October 24, 2005	Kitt Peak	Spacewatch	·	2.4 km	MPC · JPL
357844	2005 UC_{184}	—	October 25, 2005	Mount Lemmon	Mount Lemmon Survey	·	3.0 km	MPC · JPL
357845	2005 UZ_{189}	—	October 27, 2005	Mount Lemmon	Mount Lemmon Survey	THM	2.3 km	MPC · JPL
357846	2005 UQ_{190}	—	October 27, 2005	Mount Lemmon	Mount Lemmon Survey	·	2.1 km	MPC · JPL
357847	2005 UJ_{191}	—	October 27, 2005	Mount Lemmon	Mount Lemmon Survey	HYG	2.8 km	MPC · JPL
357848	2005 UE_{195}	—	October 22, 2005	Kitt Peak	Spacewatch	EOS	2.4 km	MPC · JPL
357849	2005 UU_{200}	—	October 25, 2005	Kitt Peak	Spacewatch	·	3.5 km	MPC · JPL
357850	2005 UV_{208}	—	October 27, 2005	Kitt Peak	Spacewatch	·	5.2 km	MPC · JPL
357851	2005 UX_{219}	—	October 25, 2005	Kitt Peak	Spacewatch	·	3.9 km	MPC · JPL
357852	2005 UJ_{220}	—	October 25, 2005	Kitt Peak	Spacewatch	·	3.3 km	MPC · JPL
357853	2005 UD_{227}	—	October 25, 2005	Kitt Peak	Spacewatch	·	2.3 km	MPC · JPL
357854	2005 UK_{227}	—	October 25, 2005	Kitt Peak	Spacewatch	·	3.0 km	MPC · JPL
357855	2005 UU_{235}	—	October 25, 2005	Kitt Peak	Spacewatch	·	2.3 km	MPC · JPL
357856	2005 UG_{250}	—	October 23, 2005	Catalina	CSS	·	3.6 km	MPC · JPL
357857	2005 UG_{255}	—	October 24, 2005	Kitt Peak	Spacewatch	·	2.1 km	MPC · JPL
357858	2005 UG_{258}	—	October 25, 2005	Kitt Peak	Spacewatch	·	3.5 km	MPC · JPL
357859	2005 UH_{263}	—	October 27, 2005	Kitt Peak	Spacewatch	·	2.5 km	MPC · JPL
357860	2005 UK_{268}	—	October 28, 2005	Catalina	CSS	·	4.3 km	MPC · JPL
357861	2005 UH_{279}	—	October 24, 2005	Kitt Peak	Spacewatch	·	4.0 km	MPC · JPL
357862	2005 UH_{287}	—	October 26, 2005	Kitt Peak	Spacewatch	·	2.5 km	MPC · JPL
357863	2005 UY_{290}	—	October 26, 2005	Kitt Peak	Spacewatch	EOS	2.4 km	MPC · JPL
357864	2005 UW_{294}	—	October 26, 2005	Kitt Peak	Spacewatch	·	840 m	MPC · JPL
357865	2005 UL_{301}	—	October 26, 2005	Kitt Peak	Spacewatch	·	660 m	MPC · JPL
357866	2005 UE_{308}	—	October 27, 2005	Mount Lemmon	Mount Lemmon Survey	·	3.0 km	MPC · JPL
357867	2005 UB_{310}	—	October 28, 2005	Kitt Peak	Spacewatch	·	2.8 km	MPC · JPL
357868	2005 UQ_{330}	—	October 28, 2005	Mount Lemmon	Mount Lemmon Survey	·	770 m	MPC · JPL
357869	2005 UW_{336}	—	October 30, 2005	Mount Lemmon	Mount Lemmon Survey	·	3.0 km	MPC · JPL
357870	2005 US_{342}	—	October 29, 2005	Catalina	CSS	EOS	2.4 km	MPC · JPL
357871	2005 UN_{365}	—	October 27, 2005	Kitt Peak	Spacewatch	·	2.4 km	MPC · JPL
357872	2005 UG_{367}	—	October 27, 2005	Kitt Peak	Spacewatch	·	4.6 km	MPC · JPL
357873	2005 UC_{369}	—	October 27, 2005	Kitt Peak	Spacewatch	·	3.5 km	MPC · JPL
357874	2005 UH_{378}	—	October 28, 2005	Mount Lemmon	Mount Lemmon Survey	THM	2.4 km	MPC · JPL
357875	2005 UL_{384}	—	October 27, 2005	Kitt Peak	Spacewatch	EOS	3.1 km	MPC · JPL
357876	2005 UW_{384}	—	October 27, 2005	Kitt Peak	Spacewatch	·	3.2 km	MPC · JPL
357877	2005 UO_{416}	—	October 25, 2005	Kitt Peak	Spacewatch	·	4.0 km	MPC · JPL
357878	2005 UV_{420}	—	October 25, 2005	Mount Lemmon	Mount Lemmon Survey	THM	2.3 km	MPC · JPL
357879	2005 UK_{432}	—	October 28, 2005	Kitt Peak	Spacewatch	CYB	2.4 km	MPC · JPL
357880	2005 UL_{437}	—	October 31, 2005	Kitt Peak	Spacewatch	·	2.0 km	MPC · JPL
357881	2005 UC_{440}	—	October 29, 2005	Catalina	CSS	EOS	2.7 km	MPC · JPL
357882	2005 UH_{441}	—	October 29, 2005	Palomar	NEAT	TIR	3.6 km	MPC · JPL
357883	2005 UJ_{444}	—	October 30, 2005	Catalina	CSS	·	3.4 km	MPC · JPL
357884	2005 UB_{467}	—	October 30, 2005	Kitt Peak	Spacewatch	VER	3.2 km	MPC · JPL
357885	2005 UY_{475}	—	October 22, 2005	Palomar	NEAT	EOS	3.0 km	MPC · JPL
357886	2005 UW_{476}	—	October 25, 2005	Kitt Peak	Spacewatch	EOS	2.1 km	MPC · JPL
357887	2005 UK_{477}	—	October 26, 2005	Kitt Peak	Spacewatch	EOS	2.0 km	MPC · JPL
357888	2005 UN_{512}	—	October 30, 2005	Mount Lemmon	Mount Lemmon Survey	·	5.5 km	MPC · JPL
357889	2005 UD_{515}	—	October 22, 2005	Apache Point	A. C. Becker	·	3.2 km	MPC · JPL
357890	2005 UE_{517}	—	October 25, 2005	Apache Point	A. C. Becker	EOS	1.3 km	MPC · JPL
357891	2005 UG_{519}	—	October 26, 2005	Apache Point	A. C. Becker	·	3.6 km	MPC · JPL
357892	2005 UQ_{519}	—	October 26, 2005	Apache Point	A. C. Becker	EOS	1.9 km	MPC · JPL
357893	2005 UT_{519}	—	October 26, 2005	Apache Point	A. C. Becker	·	3.4 km	MPC · JPL
357894	2005 UO_{520}	—	October 26, 2005	Apache Point	A. C. Becker	EOS	1.9 km	MPC · JPL
357895	2005 UH_{521}	—	October 26, 2005	Apache Point	A. C. Becker	·	2.0 km	MPC · JPL
357896	2005 UL_{522}	—	October 27, 2005	Apache Point	A. C. Becker	·	2.1 km	MPC · JPL
357897	2005 UF_{524}	—	October 27, 2005	Apache Point	A. C. Becker	·	2.8 km	MPC · JPL
357898	2005 VX_{17}	—	November 4, 2005	Anderson Mesa	LONEOS	·	5.0 km	MPC · JPL
357899	2005 VZ_{26}	—	November 3, 2005	Mount Lemmon	Mount Lemmon Survey	EUP	4.6 km	MPC · JPL
357900	2005 VV_{31}	—	November 4, 2005	Kitt Peak	Spacewatch	THM	2.8 km	MPC · JPL

== 357901–358000 ==
back to top

Designation			Discovery			Properties		Ref
Permanent	Provisional	Named after	Date	Site	Discoverer(s)	Category	Diam.	Ref
357901	2005 VT_{40}	—	November 4, 2005	Mount Lemmon	Mount Lemmon Survey	fast	3.3 km	MPC · JPL
357902	2005 VJ_{56}	—	November 4, 2005	Kitt Peak	Spacewatch	·	1.9 km	MPC · JPL
357903	2005 VP_{65}	—	November 1, 2005	Mount Lemmon	Mount Lemmon Survey	KOR	1.3 km	MPC · JPL
357904	2005 VC_{67}	—	November 1, 2005	Mount Lemmon	Mount Lemmon Survey	·	730 m	MPC · JPL
357905	2005 VY_{69}	—	November 1, 2005	Mount Lemmon	Mount Lemmon Survey	·	710 m	MPC · JPL
357906	2005 VZ_{85}	—	November 4, 2005	Mount Lemmon	Mount Lemmon Survey	CYB	3.5 km	MPC · JPL
357907	2005 VB_{94}	—	November 6, 2005	Kitt Peak	Spacewatch	·	3.1 km	MPC · JPL
357908	2005 VM_{110}	—	November 6, 2005	Mount Lemmon	Mount Lemmon Survey	·	2.8 km	MPC · JPL
357909	2005 VZ_{116}	—	November 11, 2005	Kitt Peak	Spacewatch	·	2.7 km	MPC · JPL
357910	2005 VJ_{127}	—	November 1, 2005	Apache Point	A. C. Becker	·	2.0 km	MPC · JPL
357911	2005 VR_{131}	—	November 1, 2005	Apache Point	A. C. Becker	EOS	2.1 km	MPC · JPL
357912	2005 WY_{2}	—	November 20, 2005	Catalina	CSS	·	3.9 km	MPC · JPL
357913	2005 WQ_{4}	—	November 20, 2005	Catalina	CSS	·	4.4 km	MPC · JPL
357914	2005 WQ_{8}	—	November 21, 2005	Kitt Peak	Spacewatch	THM	2.1 km	MPC · JPL
357915	2005 WH_{16}	—	November 22, 2005	Kitt Peak	Spacewatch	·	4.6 km	MPC · JPL
357916	2005 WB_{31}	—	November 6, 2005	Mount Lemmon	Mount Lemmon Survey	·	3.4 km	MPC · JPL
357917	2005 WD_{37}	—	October 29, 2005	Mount Lemmon	Mount Lemmon Survey	·	3.3 km	MPC · JPL
357918	2005 WS_{41}	—	November 21, 2005	Kitt Peak	Spacewatch	·	4.1 km	MPC · JPL
357919	2005 WU_{43}	—	November 21, 2005	Catalina	CSS	·	4.8 km	MPC · JPL
357920	2005 WQ_{44}	—	November 22, 2005	Kitt Peak	Spacewatch	·	4.2 km	MPC · JPL
357921	2005 WV_{48}	—	November 25, 2005	Kitt Peak	Spacewatch	·	510 m	MPC · JPL
357922	2005 WL_{69}	—	November 26, 2005	Kitt Peak	Spacewatch	·	630 m	MPC · JPL
357923	2005 WE_{75}	—	November 25, 2005	Kitt Peak	Spacewatch	·	700 m	MPC · JPL
357924	2005 WF_{123}	—	November 25, 2005	Mount Lemmon	Mount Lemmon Survey	·	2.3 km	MPC · JPL
357925	2005 WZ_{129}	—	November 25, 2005	Mount Lemmon	Mount Lemmon Survey	·	1.0 km	MPC · JPL
357926	2005 WN_{138}	—	November 26, 2005	Mount Lemmon	Mount Lemmon Survey	·	2.4 km	MPC · JPL
357927	2005 WO_{143}	—	November 30, 2005	Kitt Peak	Spacewatch	·	3.9 km	MPC · JPL
357928	2005 WX_{144}	—	November 25, 2005	Kitt Peak	Spacewatch	·	3.5 km	MPC · JPL
357929	2005 WO_{146}	—	November 25, 2005	Kitt Peak	Spacewatch	VER	3.2 km	MPC · JPL
357930	2005 WT_{159}	—	November 10, 2005	Mount Lemmon	Mount Lemmon Survey	THM	2.7 km	MPC · JPL
357931	2005 WV_{159}	—	November 30, 2005	Kitt Peak	Spacewatch	·	780 m	MPC · JPL
357932	2005 WX_{210}	—	November 26, 2005	Kitt Peak	Spacewatch	·	530 m	MPC · JPL
357933	2005 XV_{46}	—	December 2, 2005	Kitt Peak	Spacewatch	·	4.0 km	MPC · JPL
357934	2005 XR_{55}	—	December 5, 2005	Mount Lemmon	Mount Lemmon Survey	·	2.7 km	MPC · JPL
357935	2005 XP_{111}	—	December 1, 2005	Kitt Peak	M. W. Buie	NYS	1.1 km	MPC · JPL
357936	2005 YL_{5}	—	December 21, 2005	Kitt Peak	Spacewatch	·	600 m	MPC · JPL
357937	2005 YJ_{12}	—	December 21, 2005	Kitt Peak	Spacewatch	·	630 m	MPC · JPL
357938	2005 YO_{22}	—	December 24, 2005	Kitt Peak	Spacewatch	·	680 m	MPC · JPL
357939	2005 YU_{36}	—	December 25, 2005	Kitt Peak	Spacewatch	·	750 m	MPC · JPL
357940	2005 YZ_{49}	—	December 25, 2005	Kitt Peak	Spacewatch	·	570 m	MPC · JPL
357941	2005 YL_{51}	—	December 25, 2005	Mount Lemmon	Mount Lemmon Survey	·	630 m	MPC · JPL
357942	2005 YO_{51}	—	December 26, 2005	Mount Lemmon	Mount Lemmon Survey	·	5.3 km	MPC · JPL
357943	2005 YJ_{53}	—	December 22, 2005	Kitt Peak	Spacewatch	·	680 m	MPC · JPL
357944	2005 YZ_{55}	—	December 23, 2005	Kitt Peak	Spacewatch	·	2.5 km	MPC · JPL
357945	2005 YF_{59}	—	December 25, 2005	Kitt Peak	Spacewatch	·	870 m	MPC · JPL
357946	2005 YA_{61}	—	October 25, 2005	Mount Lemmon	Mount Lemmon Survey	EOS	2.0 km	MPC · JPL
357947	2005 YX_{76}	—	December 24, 2005	Kitt Peak	Spacewatch	·	3.8 km	MPC · JPL
357948	2005 YD_{106}	—	December 25, 2005	Kitt Peak	Spacewatch	·	670 m	MPC · JPL
357949	2005 YZ_{135}	—	December 26, 2005	Kitt Peak	Spacewatch	·	700 m	MPC · JPL
357950	2005 YO_{165}	—	December 30, 2005	Anderson Mesa	LONEOS	PHO	1.0 km	MPC · JPL
357951	2005 YJ_{173}	—	December 24, 2005	Socorro	LINEAR	·	660 m	MPC · JPL
357952	2005 YT_{179}	—	December 27, 2005	Mount Lemmon	Mount Lemmon Survey	·	740 m	MPC · JPL
357953	2005 YG_{187}	—	March 23, 2003	Apache Point	SDSS	V	600 m	MPC · JPL
357954	2005 YG_{229}	—	December 25, 2005	Mount Lemmon	Mount Lemmon Survey	·	840 m	MPC · JPL
357955	2005 YP_{274}	—	December 30, 2005	Kitt Peak	Spacewatch	·	620 m	MPC · JPL
357956	2006 AN_{11}	—	January 5, 2006	Catalina	CSS	·	1.2 km	MPC · JPL
357957	2006 AK_{37}	—	January 4, 2006	Kitt Peak	Spacewatch	·	640 m	MPC · JPL
357958	2006 AD_{63}	—	January 6, 2006	Kitt Peak	Spacewatch	·	1.0 km	MPC · JPL
357959	2006 AC_{69}	—	January 6, 2006	Kitt Peak	Spacewatch	·	500 m	MPC · JPL
357960	2006 BR_{2}	—	January 20, 2006	Catalina	CSS	·	1.1 km	MPC · JPL
357961	2006 BG_{7}	—	January 21, 2006	Kitt Peak	Spacewatch	·	660 m	MPC · JPL
357962	2006 BE_{30}	—	January 20, 2006	Kitt Peak	Spacewatch	·	730 m	MPC · JPL
357963	2006 BA_{33}	—	January 21, 2006	Kitt Peak	Spacewatch	V	650 m	MPC · JPL
357964	2006 BK_{34}	—	January 21, 2006	Kitt Peak	Spacewatch	·	1.0 km	MPC · JPL
357965	2006 BC_{44}	—	January 23, 2006	Kitt Peak	Spacewatch	·	910 m	MPC · JPL
357966	2006 BQ_{64}	—	January 22, 2006	Mount Lemmon	Mount Lemmon Survey	·	570 m	MPC · JPL
357967	2006 BT_{67}	—	January 23, 2006	Kitt Peak	Spacewatch	V	810 m	MPC · JPL
357968	2006 BV_{73}	—	January 23, 2006	Kitt Peak	Spacewatch	(2076)	740 m	MPC · JPL
357969	2006 BK_{79}	—	January 23, 2006	Kitt Peak	Spacewatch	·	940 m	MPC · JPL
357970	2006 BE_{96}	—	January 26, 2006	Kitt Peak	Spacewatch	·	1.1 km	MPC · JPL
357971	2006 BJ_{110}	—	January 25, 2006	Kitt Peak	Spacewatch	·	630 m	MPC · JPL
357972	2006 BU_{110}	—	January 25, 2006	Kitt Peak	Spacewatch	·	780 m	MPC · JPL
357973	2006 BW_{124}	—	January 26, 2006	Kitt Peak	Spacewatch	·	700 m	MPC · JPL
357974	2006 BU_{149}	—	January 24, 2006	Anderson Mesa	LONEOS	·	830 m	MPC · JPL
357975	2006 BE_{151}	—	January 25, 2006	Kitt Peak	Spacewatch	·	900 m	MPC · JPL
357976	2006 BD_{158}	—	January 25, 2006	Kitt Peak	Spacewatch	·	870 m	MPC · JPL
357977	2006 BX_{168}	—	January 26, 2006	Mount Lemmon	Mount Lemmon Survey	·	950 m	MPC · JPL
357978	2006 BL_{172}	—	January 10, 2006	Kitt Peak	Spacewatch	·	650 m	MPC · JPL
357979	2006 BW_{184}	—	January 28, 2006	Mount Lemmon	Mount Lemmon Survey	·	870 m	MPC · JPL
357980	2006 BR_{196}	—	January 30, 2006	Kitt Peak	Spacewatch	·	810 m	MPC · JPL
357981	2006 BW_{227}	—	January 30, 2006	Kitt Peak	Spacewatch	·	860 m	MPC · JPL
357982	2006 BK_{249}	—	January 31, 2006	Kitt Peak	Spacewatch	·	620 m	MPC · JPL
357983	2006 BU_{267}	—	January 26, 2006	Catalina	CSS	·	960 m	MPC · JPL
357984	2006 CP_{13}	—	January 7, 2006	Mount Lemmon	Mount Lemmon Survey	·	1.1 km	MPC · JPL
357985	2006 CO_{38}	—	February 2, 2006	Kitt Peak	Spacewatch	·	690 m	MPC · JPL
357986	2006 CM_{49}	—	February 3, 2006	Socorro	LINEAR	·	650 m	MPC · JPL
357987	2006 CK_{68}	—	February 1, 2006	Mount Lemmon	Mount Lemmon Survey	·	1.0 km	MPC · JPL
357988	2006 DT_{6}	—	February 20, 2006	Catalina	CSS	·	1.0 km	MPC · JPL
357989	2006 DZ_{13}	—	February 22, 2006	Catalina	CSS	·	1.5 km	MPC · JPL
357990	2006 DJ_{14}	—	February 22, 2006	Catalina	CSS	·	1.2 km	MPC · JPL
357991	2006 DQ_{28}	—	February 20, 2006	Kitt Peak	Spacewatch	·	620 m	MPC · JPL
357992	2006 DY_{28}	—	February 20, 2006	Kitt Peak	Spacewatch	·	820 m	MPC · JPL
357993	2006 DT_{30}	—	February 20, 2006	Kitt Peak	Spacewatch	·	1.1 km	MPC · JPL
357994	2006 DC_{35}	—	February 20, 2006	Kitt Peak	Spacewatch	·	910 m	MPC · JPL
357995	2006 DD_{36}	—	February 20, 2006	Kitt Peak	Spacewatch	·	870 m	MPC · JPL
357996	2006 DG_{49}	—	February 21, 2006	Mount Lemmon	Mount Lemmon Survey	·	800 m	MPC · JPL
357997	2006 DL_{49}	—	February 21, 2006	Catalina	CSS	·	770 m	MPC · JPL
357998	2006 DN_{54}	—	February 24, 2006	Kitt Peak	Spacewatch	·	1.3 km	MPC · JPL
357999	2006 DL_{59}	—	February 24, 2006	Mount Lemmon	Mount Lemmon Survey	·	970 m	MPC · JPL
358000	2006 DF_{63}	—	February 22, 2006	Calvin-Rehoboth	Calvin College	·	1.6 km	MPC · JPL

back to top

== See also ==
- Meanings of minor-planet names: 357001–358000
