= Meanings of minor-planet names: 358001–359000 =

As minor planet discoveries are confirmed, they are given a permanent number by the IAU's Minor Planet Center (MPC), and the discoverers can then submit names for them, following the IAU's naming conventions. The list below concerns those minor planets in the specified number-range that have received names, and explains the meanings of those names.

Official naming citations of newly named small Solar System bodies are approved and published in a bulletin by IAU's Working Group for Small Bodies Nomenclature (WGSBN). Before May 2021, citations were published in MPC's Minor Planet Circulars for many decades. Recent citations can also be found on the JPL Small-Body Database (SBDB). Until his death in 2016, German astronomer Lutz D. Schmadel compiled these citations into the Dictionary of Minor Planet Names (DMP) and regularly updated the collection.

Based on Paul Herget's The Names of the Minor Planets, Schmadel also researched the unclear origin of numerous asteroids, most of which had been named prior to World War II. This article incorporates text from this source, which is in the public domain: SBDB New namings may only be added to this list below after official publication as the preannouncement of names is condemned. The WGSBN publishes a comprehensive guideline for the naming rules of non-cometary small Solar System bodies.

== 358001–358100 ==
Named minor planet	Provisional	This minor planet was named for...	Ref · Catalog
There are no named minor planets in this number range

== 358101–358200 ==
back to top

Named minor planet	Provisional	This minor planet was named for...	Ref · Catalog
358167 Barbaralong	2006 RK_{119}	Barbara Long, worked in public relations and communications for the Emporia and Topeka, Kansas, school districts. She helped to advocate for funding for public schools in a district that was sued in the 1950s over school segregation — the famous Brown v. Board of Education case.	IAU · 358167
358179 Szegőkároly	2006 SZ_{77}	Károly Szegő, Hungarian physicist and space scientist.	IAU · 358179

== 358201–358300 ==
back to top

Named minor planet	Provisional	This minor planet was named for...	Ref · Catalog
There are no named minor planets in this number range

== 358301–358400 ==
back to top

Named minor planet	Provisional	This minor planet was named for...	Ref · Catalog
358376 Gwyn	2006 XT_{67}	Stephen Gwyn (born 1968), an astronomer working for the Canadian Astronomy Data Centre	JPL · 358376

== 358401–358500 ==
back to top

Named minor planet	Provisional	This minor planet was named for...	Ref · Catalog
There are no named minor planets in this number range

== 358501–358600 ==
back to top

Named minor planet	Provisional	This minor planet was named for...	Ref · Catalog
There are no named minor planets in this number range

== 358601–358700 ==
back to top

Named minor planet	Provisional	This minor planet was named for...	Ref · Catalog
358675 Bente	2007 YY_{1}	Bente Vandenbussche (born 2014) is the daughter of Bart Vandenbussche, a colleague of Belgian discoverer Peter De Cat	JPL · 358675

== 358701–358800 ==
back to top

Named minor planet	Provisional	This minor planet was named for...	Ref · Catalog
There are no named minor planets in this number range

== 358801–358900 ==
back to top

Named minor planet	Provisional	This minor planet was named for...	Ref · Catalog
358894 Demetrescu	2008 GD_{44}	Gheorghe Demetrescu (1885–1969), a Romanian astronomer and mathematician	JPL · 358894

== 358901–359000 ==
back to top

Named minor planet	Provisional	This minor planet was named for...	Ref · Catalog
There are no named minor planets in this number range

back to top

Preceded by 357,001–358,000	Meanings of minor-planet names List of minor planets: 358,001–359,000	Succeeded by 359,001–360,000
