= List of minor planets: 322001–323000 =

The following is a partial list of minor planets, running from minor-planet number 322001 through 323000, inclusive. The primary data for this and other partial lists is based on JPL's "Small-Body Orbital Elements" and data available from the Minor Planet Center. Critical list information is also provided by the MPC, unless otherwise specified from Lowell Observatory. A detailed description of the table's columns and additional sources are given on the main page including a complete list of every page in this series, and a statistical break-up on the dynamical classification of minor planets.

Also see the summary list of all named bodies in numerical and alphabetical order, and the corresponding naming citations for the number range of this particular list. New namings may only be added to this list after official publication, as the preannouncement of names is condemned by the Working Group for Small Bodies Nomenclature of the International Astronomical Union.

Near-Earth obj.	MBA (inner)	MBA (outer)	Centaur
Mars-crosser	MBA (middle)	Jupiter trojan	Trans-Neptunian obj.
Unclassified

== 322001–322100 ==
Designation			Discovery			Properties		Ref
Permanent	Provisional	Named after	Date	Site	Discoverer(s)	Category	Diam.	Ref
322001	2010 UZ_{79}	—	September 1, 2005	Kitt Peak	Spacewatch	·	2.3 km	MPC · JPL
322002	2010 UK_{81}	—	January 18, 2006	Palomar	NEAT	·	6.1 km	MPC · JPL
322003	2010 UE_{82}	—	November 3, 1999	Heppenheim	Stoss, R.	HYG	2.8 km	MPC · JPL
322004	2010 UM_{83}	—	October 1, 2005	Catalina	CSS	·	2.5 km	MPC · JPL
322005	2010 UU_{83}	—	October 7, 2004	Socorro	LINEAR	LUT	5.8 km	MPC · JPL
322006	2010 UA_{85}	—	September 25, 2005	Kitt Peak	Spacewatch	·	1.6 km	MPC · JPL
322007	2010 UA_{92}	—	April 6, 2008	Mount Lemmon	Mount Lemmon Survey	THM	2.4 km	MPC · JPL
322008	2010 UC_{92}	—	October 23, 2006	Mount Lemmon	Mount Lemmon Survey	(5)	1.3 km	MPC · JPL
322009	2010 UV_{92}	—	August 3, 1997	Xinglong	SCAP	·	1.4 km	MPC · JPL
322010	2010 UX_{92}	—	February 6, 2007	Mount Lemmon	Mount Lemmon Survey	·	1.9 km	MPC · JPL
322011	2010 UF_{93}	—	November 17, 2006	Mount Lemmon	Mount Lemmon Survey	·	1.6 km	MPC · JPL
322012	2010 UQ_{93}	—	April 15, 2005	Catalina	CSS	·	1.6 km	MPC · JPL
322013	2010 UC_{95}	—	February 2, 2008	Kitt Peak	Spacewatch	·	1.7 km	MPC · JPL
322014	2010 UK_{95}	—	December 30, 2007	Kitt Peak	Spacewatch	·	1.6 km	MPC · JPL
322015	2010 UU_{95}	—	October 7, 1999	Kitt Peak	Spacewatch	·	2.5 km	MPC · JPL
322016	2010 UL_{98}	—	May 15, 2001	Anderson Mesa	LONEOS	T_{j} (2.98) · EUP	4.8 km	MPC · JPL
322017	2010 UY_{100}	—	September 18, 2004	Socorro	LINEAR	·	3.9 km	MPC · JPL
322018	2010 UR_{101}	—	October 6, 1996	Kitt Peak	Spacewatch	·	2.7 km	MPC · JPL
322019	2010 UO_{106}	—	January 9, 2006	Kitt Peak	Spacewatch	·	3.8 km	MPC · JPL
322020	2010 VC_{11}	—	September 18, 1995	Kitt Peak	Spacewatch	NYS	1.4 km	MPC · JPL
322021	2010 VE_{11}	—	January 10, 2007	Mount Lemmon	Mount Lemmon Survey	·	2.9 km	MPC · JPL
322022	2010 VD_{12}	—	January 4, 2006	Kitt Peak	Spacewatch	·	2.3 km	MPC · JPL
322023	2010 VH_{15}	—	August 26, 2005	Palomar	NEAT	·	2.2 km	MPC · JPL
322024	2010 VE_{17}	—	April 14, 2008	Mount Lemmon	Mount Lemmon Survey	·	2.6 km	MPC · JPL
322025	2010 VW_{18}	—	February 2, 2006	Mount Lemmon	Mount Lemmon Survey	·	1.1 km	MPC · JPL
322026	2010 VC_{19}	—	October 1, 2005	Catalina	CSS	·	2.5 km	MPC · JPL
322027	2010 VF_{20}	—	March 16, 2007	Kitt Peak	Spacewatch	·	4.3 km	MPC · JPL
322028	2010 VO_{20}	—	November 17, 2006	Mount Lemmon	Mount Lemmon Survey	·	1.7 km	MPC · JPL
322029	2010 VC_{26}	—	March 11, 2007	Mount Lemmon	Mount Lemmon Survey	·	2.2 km	MPC · JPL
322030	2010 VG_{26}	—	December 5, 1996	Kitt Peak	Spacewatch	·	2.5 km	MPC · JPL
322031	2010 VZ_{26}	—	August 26, 2009	Catalina	CSS	·	4.4 km	MPC · JPL
322032	2010 VB_{27}	—	November 29, 2005	Mount Lemmon	Mount Lemmon Survey	KOR	1.7 km	MPC · JPL
322033	2010 VZ_{28}	—	December 25, 2000	Kitt Peak	Spacewatch	·	2.4 km	MPC · JPL
322034	2010 VC_{30}	—	September 11, 2004	Socorro	LINEAR	·	3.5 km	MPC · JPL
322035	2010 VK_{34}	—	March 28, 2008	Kitt Peak	Spacewatch	·	4.2 km	MPC · JPL
322036	2010 VE_{36}	—	November 10, 2006	Kitt Peak	Spacewatch	·	1.6 km	MPC · JPL
322037	2010 VH_{36}	—	September 28, 2001	Palomar	NEAT	·	2.1 km	MPC · JPL
322038	2010 VN_{37}	—	August 28, 2005	Kitt Peak	Spacewatch	·	2.7 km	MPC · JPL
322039	2010 VO_{38}	—	December 11, 2001	Socorro	LINEAR	·	2.3 km	MPC · JPL
322040	2010 VJ_{39}	—	September 3, 2005	Palomar	NEAT	HOF	3.3 km	MPC · JPL
322041	2010 VN_{39}	—	March 12, 2007	Kitt Peak	Spacewatch	fast	4.7 km	MPC · JPL
322042	2010 VZ_{45}	—	August 16, 2009	Catalina	CSS	·	4.5 km	MPC · JPL
322043	2010 VG_{49}	—	January 5, 2003	Kitt Peak	Spacewatch	·	1.7 km	MPC · JPL
322044	2010 VJ_{54}	—	September 17, 2004	Wise	Polishook, D.	·	3.6 km	MPC · JPL
322045	2010 VD_{55}	—	April 24, 2006	Kitt Peak	Spacewatch	·	790 m	MPC · JPL
322046	2010 VT_{57}	—	August 27, 2001	Palomar	NEAT	·	2.3 km	MPC · JPL
322047	2010 VM_{58}	—	January 28, 2007	Kitt Peak	Spacewatch	TEL	1.4 km	MPC · JPL
322048	2010 VE_{61}	—	October 10, 2004	Kitt Peak	Spacewatch	·	4.4 km	MPC · JPL
322049	2010 VU_{61}	—	November 19, 2003	Kitt Peak	Spacewatch	·	1.3 km	MPC · JPL
322050	2010 VD_{62}	—	August 17, 2001	Palomar	NEAT	ADE	3.7 km	MPC · JPL
322051	2010 VJ_{62}	—	November 5, 2010	Kitt Peak	Spacewatch	·	5.1 km	MPC · JPL
322052	2010 VE_{65}	—	September 7, 1999	Kitt Peak	Spacewatch	·	2.1 km	MPC · JPL
322053	2010 VE_{71}	—	July 9, 2002	Palomar	NEAT	·	1.4 km	MPC · JPL
322054	2010 VK_{73}	—	February 18, 2008	Mount Lemmon	Mount Lemmon Survey	NEM	2.8 km	MPC · JPL
322055	2010 VS_{73}	—	December 16, 2006	Kitt Peak	Spacewatch	·	1.5 km	MPC · JPL
322056	2010 VQ_{75}	—	December 6, 2005	Kitt Peak	Spacewatch	EOS	2.3 km	MPC · JPL
322057	2010 VJ_{77}	—	October 4, 2004	Kitt Peak	Spacewatch	·	3.7 km	MPC · JPL
322058	2010 VX_{78}	—	September 30, 2010	Mount Lemmon	Mount Lemmon Survey	L4	10 km	MPC · JPL
322059	2010 VC_{79}	—	October 12, 2005	Kitt Peak	Spacewatch	·	1.7 km	MPC · JPL
322060	2010 VE_{79}	—	October 14, 1999	Kitt Peak	Spacewatch	·	1.5 km	MPC · JPL
322061	2010 VH_{86}	—	November 21, 1997	Kitt Peak	Spacewatch	·	2.0 km	MPC · JPL
322062	2010 VX_{87}	—	November 20, 2006	Kitt Peak	Spacewatch	·	1.2 km	MPC · JPL
322063	2010 VO_{88}	—	September 21, 2001	Kitt Peak	Spacewatch	·	1.8 km	MPC · JPL
322064	2010 VD_{91}	—	February 6, 2003	Palomar	NEAT	EUN	2.3 km	MPC · JPL
322065	2010 VH_{91}	—	October 22, 1995	Kitt Peak	Spacewatch	KOR	1.7 km	MPC · JPL
322066	2010 VA_{94}	—	September 11, 2004	Kitt Peak	Spacewatch	·	2.5 km	MPC · JPL
322067	2010 VM_{96}	—	November 20, 2001	Socorro	LINEAR	·	1.7 km	MPC · JPL
322068	2010 VK_{98}	—	June 10, 2005	Kitt Peak	Spacewatch	L4	10 km	MPC · JPL
322069	2010 VR_{101}	—	January 13, 2005	Kitt Peak	Spacewatch	·	820 m	MPC · JPL
322070	2010 VB_{107}	—	September 5, 2010	Mount Lemmon	Mount Lemmon Survey	·	3.9 km	MPC · JPL
322071	2010 VU_{107}	—	November 10, 2010	Mount Lemmon	Mount Lemmon Survey	L4	10 km	MPC · JPL
322072	2010 VV_{111}	—	July 20, 2004	Siding Spring	SSS	LIX	4.4 km	MPC · JPL
322073	2010 VW_{111}	—	November 10, 1999	Kitt Peak	Spacewatch	·	2.5 km	MPC · JPL
322074	2010 VB_{112}	—	April 13, 2004	Siding Spring	R. H. McNaught	·	1.8 km	MPC · JPL
322075	2010 VO_{112}	—	April 7, 2008	Kitt Peak	Spacewatch	·	1.8 km	MPC · JPL
322076	2010 VW_{112}	—	September 18, 2010	Mount Lemmon	Mount Lemmon Survey	EOS	2.5 km	MPC · JPL
322077	2010 VC_{115}	—	November 1, 2005	Mount Lemmon	Mount Lemmon Survey	·	2.2 km	MPC · JPL
322078	2010 VP_{116}	—	December 1, 2006	Mount Lemmon	Mount Lemmon Survey	·	2.1 km	MPC · JPL
322079	2010 VE_{117}	—	February 10, 2002	Socorro	LINEAR	·	2.1 km	MPC · JPL
322080	2010 VP_{117}	—	September 6, 2008	Mount Lemmon	Mount Lemmon Survey	L4	7.5 km	MPC · JPL
322081	2010 VW_{117}	—	December 21, 2006	Kitt Peak	Spacewatch	·	1.9 km	MPC · JPL
322082	2010 VP_{118}	—	April 5, 2002	Palomar	NEAT	·	2.4 km	MPC · JPL
322083	2010 VC_{121}	—	January 27, 2007	Kitt Peak	Spacewatch	AGN	1.3 km	MPC · JPL
322084	2010 VS_{121}	—	August 15, 2004	Campo Imperatore	CINEOS	·	3.1 km	MPC · JPL
322085	2010 VL_{122}	—	March 11, 2008	Kitt Peak	Spacewatch	NEM	2.4 km	MPC · JPL
322086	2010 VM_{123}	—	December 21, 2006	Mount Lemmon	Mount Lemmon Survey	·	2.5 km	MPC · JPL
322087	2010 VQ_{123}	—	April 8, 2002	Kitt Peak	Spacewatch	·	4.8 km	MPC · JPL
322088	2010 VX_{126}	—	September 27, 2000	Kitt Peak	Spacewatch	·	2.0 km	MPC · JPL
322089	2010 VK_{127}	—	December 4, 2005	Kitt Peak	Spacewatch	KOR	1.5 km	MPC · JPL
322090	2010 VJ_{129}	—	March 20, 2004	Kitt Peak	Spacewatch	·	1.9 km	MPC · JPL
322091	2010 VF_{130}	—	January 20, 2001	Haleakala	NEAT	·	4.1 km	MPC · JPL
322092	2010 VO_{132}	—	May 9, 2002	Palomar	NEAT	·	3.2 km	MPC · JPL
322093	2010 VH_{133}	—	December 7, 2005	Kitt Peak	Spacewatch	·	3.2 km	MPC · JPL
322094	2010 VW_{133}	—	September 14, 2005	Kitt Peak	Spacewatch	·	2.2 km	MPC · JPL
322095	2010 VZ_{134}	—	March 14, 2007	Mount Lemmon	Mount Lemmon Survey	·	2.7 km	MPC · JPL
322096	2010 VM_{135}	—	October 24, 2005	Kitt Peak	Spacewatch	·	2.2 km	MPC · JPL
322097	2010 VR_{137}	—	October 9, 1993	La Silla	E. W. Elst	·	2.5 km	MPC · JPL
322098	2010 VD_{138}	—	November 26, 2005	Mount Lemmon	Mount Lemmon Survey	·	3.7 km	MPC · JPL
322099	2010 VP_{138}	—	November 24, 2005	Palomar	NEAT	·	2.4 km	MPC · JPL
322100	2010 VP_{140}	—	March 10, 1999	Kitt Peak	Spacewatch	·	1.5 km	MPC · JPL

== 322101–322200 ==
back to top

Designation			Discovery			Properties		Ref
Permanent	Provisional	Named after	Date	Site	Discoverer(s)	Category	Diam.	Ref
322101	2010 VC_{142}	—	January 16, 2005	Kitt Peak	Spacewatch	·	890 m	MPC · JPL
322102	2010 VR_{143}	—	December 29, 1997	Kitt Peak	Spacewatch	·	2.4 km	MPC · JPL
322103	2010 VZ_{143}	—	January 8, 1994	Kitt Peak	Spacewatch	·	2.2 km	MPC · JPL
322104	2010 VL_{145}	—	October 29, 2003	Kitt Peak	Spacewatch	V	920 m	MPC · JPL
322105	2010 VN_{146}	—	December 2, 2005	Kitt Peak	Spacewatch	·	4.1 km	MPC · JPL
322106	2010 VM_{151}	—	January 23, 2003	Kitt Peak	Spacewatch	(5)	1.8 km	MPC · JPL
322107	2010 VC_{152}	—	September 24, 2000	Socorro	LINEAR	·	800 m	MPC · JPL
322108	2010 VF_{152}	—	July 24, 2003	Palomar	NEAT	·	860 m	MPC · JPL
322109	2010 VV_{152}	—	May 14, 2005	Mount Lemmon	Mount Lemmon Survey	·	1.3 km	MPC · JPL
322110	2010 VJ_{153}	—	March 19, 2004	Palomar	NEAT	BRG	3.0 km	MPC · JPL
322111	2010 VZ_{158}	—	April 8, 2008	Kitt Peak	Spacewatch	·	2.2 km	MPC · JPL
322112	2010 VB_{159}	—	March 16, 2009	Kitt Peak	Spacewatch	·	1.2 km	MPC · JPL
322113	2010 VM_{159}	—	February 9, 2003	Palomar	NEAT	·	1.9 km	MPC · JPL
322114	2010 VR_{161}	—	December 8, 1999	Kitt Peak	Spacewatch	·	3.6 km	MPC · JPL
322115	2010 VD_{162}	—	August 27, 2003	Palomar	NEAT	·	770 m	MPC · JPL
322116	2010 VH_{162}	—	September 22, 2003	Kitt Peak	Spacewatch	·	750 m	MPC · JPL
322117	2010 VN_{162}	—	March 15, 2007	Kitt Peak	Spacewatch	·	3.5 km	MPC · JPL
322118	2010 VJ_{165}	—	August 27, 2005	Kitt Peak	Spacewatch	·	1.7 km	MPC · JPL
322119	2010 VT_{166}	—	October 28, 2006	Mount Lemmon	Mount Lemmon Survey	·	1.3 km	MPC · JPL
322120	2010 VS_{168}	—	September 21, 2003	Kitt Peak	Spacewatch	CYB	3.6 km	MPC · JPL
322121	2010 VY_{168}	—	April 10, 2005	Mount Lemmon	Mount Lemmon Survey	·	1.3 km	MPC · JPL
322122	2010 VC_{170}	—	November 1, 2005	Mount Lemmon	Mount Lemmon Survey	·	2.9 km	MPC · JPL
322123	2010 VF_{171}	—	December 2, 2005	Kitt Peak	Spacewatch	EOS	2.4 km	MPC · JPL
322124	2010 VH_{171}	—	November 16, 2006	Kitt Peak	Spacewatch	·	1.4 km	MPC · JPL
322125	2010 VY_{173}	—	December 19, 2004	Mount Lemmon	Mount Lemmon Survey	·	940 m	MPC · JPL
322126	2010 VM_{177}	—	October 9, 2004	Socorro	LINEAR	·	3.3 km	MPC · JPL
322127	2010 VQ_{178}	—	April 26, 2000	Kitt Peak	Spacewatch	·	1.3 km	MPC · JPL
322128	2010 VW_{178}	—	January 10, 2003	Kitt Peak	Spacewatch	·	1.8 km	MPC · JPL
322129	2010 VZ_{181}	—	October 13, 1993	Kitt Peak	Spacewatch	(43176)	4.1 km	MPC · JPL
322130	2010 VC_{182}	—	September 16, 2009	Mount Lemmon	Mount Lemmon Survey	·	3.0 km	MPC · JPL
322131	2010 VL_{182}	—	May 27, 2008	Kitt Peak	Spacewatch	·	3.6 km	MPC · JPL
322132	2010 VP_{182}	—	November 20, 2006	Kitt Peak	Spacewatch	GEF	1.6 km	MPC · JPL
322133	2010 VU_{182}	—	April 5, 2003	Kitt Peak	Spacewatch	·	2.4 km	MPC · JPL
322134	2010 VS_{183}	—	July 29, 2005	Siding Spring	SSS	·	2.2 km	MPC · JPL
322135	2010 VX_{184}	—	July 19, 2009	Siding Spring	SSS	·	2.4 km	MPC · JPL
322136	2010 VH_{192}	—	September 28, 2006	Mount Lemmon	Mount Lemmon Survey	·	1.8 km	MPC · JPL
322137	2010 VV_{192}	—	January 15, 2000	Kitt Peak	Spacewatch	L4	10 km	MPC · JPL
322138	2010 VR_{199}	—	March 27, 2003	Kitt Peak	Spacewatch	·	2.6 km	MPC · JPL
322139	2010 VV_{199}	—	June 29, 2005	Kitt Peak	Spacewatch	·	1.7 km	MPC · JPL
322140	2010 VA_{200}	—	April 28, 2003	Kitt Peak	Spacewatch	·	4.2 km	MPC · JPL
322141	2010 WY_{1}	—	February 28, 2008	Kitt Peak	Spacewatch	·	1.6 km	MPC · JPL
322142	2010 WH_{4}	—	January 13, 2002	Kitt Peak	Spacewatch	KOR	1.2 km	MPC · JPL
322143	2010 WD_{6}	—	March 18, 1999	Kitt Peak	Spacewatch	·	1.5 km	MPC · JPL
322144	2010 WT_{7}	—	November 25, 2006	Kitt Peak	Spacewatch	·	1.4 km	MPC · JPL
322145	2010 WH_{9}	—	September 29, 2005	Goodricke-Pigott	R. A. Tucker	·	3.7 km	MPC · JPL
322146	2010 WS_{14}	—	January 15, 2002	Kitt Peak	Spacewatch	KOR	1.6 km	MPC · JPL
322147	2010 WM_{18}	—	March 24, 2003	Kitt Peak	Spacewatch	AGN	1.3 km	MPC · JPL
322148	2010 WM_{25}	—	August 29, 2005	Kitt Peak	Spacewatch	·	1.5 km	MPC · JPL
322149	2010 WO_{30}	—	May 18, 2002	Palomar	NEAT	·	3.4 km	MPC · JPL
322150	2010 WY_{32}	—	August 23, 2004	Kitt Peak	Spacewatch	HYG	2.5 km	MPC · JPL
322151	2010 WX_{36}	—	April 13, 2002	Palomar	NEAT	·	3.3 km	MPC · JPL
322152	2010 WC_{46}	—	October 24, 2005	Kitt Peak	Spacewatch	·	2.0 km	MPC · JPL
322153	2010 WM_{50}	—	October 15, 1995	Kitt Peak	Spacewatch	KOR	1.7 km	MPC · JPL
322154	2010 WY_{51}	—	February 9, 1999	Kitt Peak	Spacewatch	·	1.6 km	MPC · JPL
322155	2010 WX_{53}	—	January 9, 2006	Kitt Peak	Spacewatch	·	3.6 km	MPC · JPL
322156	2010 WC_{58}	—	September 14, 1994	Kitt Peak	Spacewatch	·	2.2 km	MPC · JPL
322157	2010 WC_{61}	—	September 27, 2009	Mount Lemmon	Mount Lemmon Survey	L4	9.2 km	MPC · JPL
322158	2010 WW_{61}	—	October 1, 2005	Kitt Peak	Spacewatch	·	2.2 km	MPC · JPL
322159	2010 WE_{63}	—	October 2, 1999	Kitt Peak	Spacewatch	·	3.0 km	MPC · JPL
322160	2010 WA_{65}	—	October 9, 2004	Anderson Mesa	LONEOS	EOS	2.5 km	MPC · JPL
322161	2010 WH_{69}	—	February 8, 2002	Kitt Peak	Deep Ecliptic Survey	·	2.3 km	MPC · JPL
322162	2010 WD_{72}	—	November 6, 2010	Kitt Peak	Spacewatch	EOS	2.9 km	MPC · JPL
322163	2010 WF_{72}	—	May 6, 2002	Palomar	NEAT	·	4.2 km	MPC · JPL
322164	2010 WF_{74}	—	January 20, 2006	Kitt Peak	Spacewatch	·	3.1 km	MPC · JPL
322165	2010 XH_{1}	—	May 22, 2003	Kitt Peak	Spacewatch	EUP	7.0 km	MPC · JPL
322166	2010 XZ_{12}	—	September 28, 2006	Mount Lemmon	Mount Lemmon Survey	EUN	2.0 km	MPC · JPL
322167	2010 XA_{13}	—	May 19, 2005	Mount Lemmon	Mount Lemmon Survey	L4	10 km	MPC · JPL
322168	2010 XB_{13}	—	December 10, 2006	Kitt Peak	Spacewatch	·	1.8 km	MPC · JPL
322169	2010 XT_{18}	—	July 11, 1994	La Silla	E. W. Elst	·	1.9 km	MPC · JPL
322170	2010 XT_{20}	—	February 7, 2007	Kitt Peak	Spacewatch	·	1.9 km	MPC · JPL
322171	2010 XG_{21}	—	February 12, 2002	Kitt Peak	Spacewatch	L4	10 km	MPC · JPL
322172	2010 XH_{24}	—	January 19, 1996	Kitt Peak	Spacewatch	TEL	2.0 km	MPC · JPL
322173	2010 XJ_{25}	—	April 3, 2008	Mount Lemmon	Mount Lemmon Survey	EOS	2.8 km	MPC · JPL
322174	2010 XU_{25}	—	November 1, 2005	Mount Lemmon	Mount Lemmon Survey	·	2.8 km	MPC · JPL
322175	2010 XZ_{28}	—	August 31, 2005	Kitt Peak	Spacewatch	·	1.8 km	MPC · JPL
322176	2010 XR_{30}	—	August 31, 2005	Kitt Peak	Spacewatch	·	1.7 km	MPC · JPL
322177	2010 XA_{31}	—	May 4, 2002	Kitt Peak	Spacewatch	·	3.1 km	MPC · JPL
322178	2010 XW_{31}	—	December 24, 2005	Kitt Peak	Spacewatch	·	2.0 km	MPC · JPL
322179	2010 XK_{32}	—	November 25, 2005	Mount Lemmon	Mount Lemmon Survey	·	3.6 km	MPC · JPL
322180	2010 XO_{39}	—	July 12, 2004	Reedy Creek	J. Broughton	·	3.1 km	MPC · JPL
322181	2010 XF_{40}	—	February 8, 1999	Kitt Peak	Spacewatch	·	2.1 km	MPC · JPL
322182	2010 XO_{43}	—	October 4, 2004	Kitt Peak	Spacewatch	VER	3.7 km	MPC · JPL
322183	2010 XP_{44}	—	June 15, 2007	Socorro	LINEAR	·	6.3 km	MPC · JPL
322184	2010 XX_{51}	—	November 28, 2006	Kitt Peak	Spacewatch	·	1.8 km	MPC · JPL
322185	2010 XA_{53}	—	October 27, 2005	Kitt Peak	Spacewatch	KOR	1.5 km	MPC · JPL
322186	2010 XS_{54}	—	August 23, 2001	Anderson Mesa	LONEOS	·	2.1 km	MPC · JPL
322187	2010 XM_{59}	—	October 12, 1999	Kitt Peak	Spacewatch	·	2.9 km	MPC · JPL
322188	2010 XX_{59}	—	December 2, 2005	Kitt Peak	Spacewatch	·	2.1 km	MPC · JPL
322189	2010 XG_{63}	—	August 21, 2004	Siding Spring	SSS	·	2.7 km	MPC · JPL
322190	2010 XW_{69}	—	August 18, 2009	Catalina	CSS	EUP	7.0 km	MPC · JPL
322191	2010 XM_{70}	—	October 28, 2005	Mount Lemmon	Mount Lemmon Survey	(5651)	3.9 km	MPC · JPL
322192	2010 XN_{70}	—	November 4, 2005	Kitt Peak	Spacewatch	HOF	2.6 km	MPC · JPL
322193	2010 XB_{76}	—	March 15, 2008	Mount Lemmon	Mount Lemmon Survey	·	3.5 km	MPC · JPL
322194	2010 XW_{76}	—	November 23, 2009	Catalina	CSS	L4	9.6 km	MPC · JPL
322195	2010 XZ_{77}	—	February 9, 2007	Kitt Peak	Spacewatch	HOF	2.8 km	MPC · JPL
322196	2010 XV_{78}	—	November 6, 2010	Mount Lemmon	Mount Lemmon Survey	L4	10 km	MPC · JPL
322197	2010 XZ_{79}	—	October 29, 2005	Catalina	CSS	AGN	1.5 km	MPC · JPL
322198	2010 XE_{80}	—	October 4, 1999	Kitt Peak	Spacewatch	·	2.1 km	MPC · JPL
322199	2010 XS_{82}	—	September 16, 2003	Kitt Peak	Spacewatch	·	3.8 km	MPC · JPL
322200	2010 XC_{83}	—	October 30, 2005	Mount Lemmon	Mount Lemmon Survey	EOS	3.0 km	MPC · JPL

== 322201–322300 ==
back to top

Designation			Discovery			Properties		Ref
Permanent	Provisional	Named after	Date	Site	Discoverer(s)	Category	Diam.	Ref
322201	2010 XY_{83}	—	April 15, 2002	Anderson Mesa	LONEOS	·	3.0 km	MPC · JPL
322202	2010 XM_{85}	—	November 3, 2005	Mount Lemmon	Mount Lemmon Survey	·	3.4 km	MPC · JPL
322203	2010 YZ	—	November 9, 2004	Catalina	CSS	·	3.7 km	MPC · JPL
322204	2010 YA_{4}	—	December 2, 1996	Kitt Peak	Spacewatch	AGN	1.3 km	MPC · JPL
322205	2010 YW_{4}	—	October 15, 2004	Mount Lemmon	Mount Lemmon Survey	·	4.1 km	MPC · JPL
322206	2011 AP_{3}	—	January 24, 2006	Anderson Mesa	LONEOS	·	3.8 km	MPC · JPL
322207	2011 AL_{10}	—	November 17, 1999	Kitt Peak	Spacewatch	·	1.8 km	MPC · JPL
322208	2011 AK_{14}	—	November 8, 2009	Mount Lemmon	Mount Lemmon Survey	3:2 · SHU	5.5 km	MPC · JPL
322209	2011 AS_{25}	—	September 5, 1994	La Silla	E. W. Elst	·	1.5 km	MPC · JPL
322210	2011 AQ_{31}	—	February 2, 2006	Kitt Peak	Spacewatch	·	3.2 km	MPC · JPL
322211	2011 AE_{33}	—	November 11, 2006	Kitt Peak	Spacewatch	·	1.2 km	MPC · JPL
322212	2011 AE_{40}	—	December 24, 2006	Mount Lemmon	Mount Lemmon Survey	·	2.2 km	MPC · JPL
322213	2011 AD_{43}	—	August 25, 2003	Socorro	LINEAR	·	2.7 km	MPC · JPL
322214	2011 AN_{46}	—	July 22, 1995	Kitt Peak	Spacewatch	·	2.2 km	MPC · JPL
322215	2011 AR_{47}	—	March 17, 2004	Kitt Peak	Spacewatch	3:2	5.0 km	MPC · JPL
322216	2011 AQ_{52}	—	December 16, 2004	Kitt Peak	Spacewatch	·	3.1 km	MPC · JPL
322217	2011 AY_{56}	—	November 19, 2003	Socorro	LINEAR	·	860 m	MPC · JPL
322218	2011 AX_{60}	—	January 28, 2006	Kitt Peak	Spacewatch	·	4.0 km	MPC · JPL
322219	2011 AY_{62}	—	October 21, 2003	Kitt Peak	Spacewatch	·	3.5 km	MPC · JPL
322220	2011 AB_{69}	—	February 10, 2002	Socorro	LINEAR	·	1.9 km	MPC · JPL
322221	2011 AS_{70}	—	January 13, 2000	Kitt Peak	Spacewatch	·	3.7 km	MPC · JPL
322222	2011 AE_{72}	—	December 5, 2005	Kitt Peak	Spacewatch	·	2.4 km	MPC · JPL
322223	2011 AU_{73}	—	March 20, 1999	Apache Point	SDSS	·	1.6 km	MPC · JPL
322224	2011 AA_{74}	—	December 21, 2005	Kitt Peak	Spacewatch	·	2.5 km	MPC · JPL
322225	2011 BM_{6}	—	October 7, 2005	Kitt Peak	Spacewatch	·	1.2 km	MPC · JPL
322226	2011 BY_{6}	—	September 5, 2000	Kitt Peak	Spacewatch	·	1.8 km	MPC · JPL
322227	2011 BQ_{47}	—	November 29, 1997	Kitt Peak	Spacewatch	·	3.3 km	MPC · JPL
322228	2011 BZ_{52}	—	September 28, 2003	Kitt Peak	Spacewatch	·	3.9 km	MPC · JPL
322229	2011 BW_{53}	—	February 29, 2004	Kitt Peak	Spacewatch	·	1.4 km	MPC · JPL
322230	2011 BD_{62}	—	April 14, 2004	Kitt Peak	Spacewatch	·	1.8 km	MPC · JPL
322231	2011 BE_{65}	—	January 29, 1998	Kitt Peak	Spacewatch	MIS	2.7 km	MPC · JPL
322232	2011 BP_{74}	—	December 18, 1995	Kitt Peak	Spacewatch	·	1.3 km	MPC · JPL
322233	2011 BJ_{79}	—	December 13, 2004	Kitt Peak	Spacewatch	·	4.4 km	MPC · JPL
322234	2011 BU_{81}	—	October 15, 2001	Kitt Peak	Spacewatch	·	1.0 km	MPC · JPL
322235	2011 BH_{82}	—	November 11, 1996	Kitt Peak	Spacewatch	·	2.6 km	MPC · JPL
322236	2011 BR_{110}	—	July 4, 2005	Kitt Peak	Spacewatch	V	660 m	MPC · JPL
322237	2011 BV_{114}	—	April 5, 2000	Socorro	LINEAR	·	1.4 km	MPC · JPL
322238	2011 BX_{119}	—	February 1, 1995	Kitt Peak	Spacewatch	·	2.9 km	MPC · JPL
322239	2011 BN_{124}	—	November 16, 2003	Kitt Peak	Spacewatch	·	3.8 km	MPC · JPL
322240	2011 BH_{137}	—	March 26, 2004	Kitt Peak	Spacewatch	NYS	1.3 km	MPC · JPL
322241	2011 CY_{14}	—	November 10, 2004	Kitt Peak	Spacewatch	KOR	1.7 km	MPC · JPL
322242	2011 CW_{41}	—	March 26, 2001	Kitt Peak	Spacewatch	·	950 m	MPC · JPL
322243	2011 CG_{63}	—	May 29, 2001	Haleakala	NEAT	·	4.9 km	MPC · JPL
322244	2011 CG_{73}	—	March 5, 2000	Socorro	LINEAR	·	5.1 km	MPC · JPL
322245	2011 CX_{77}	—	April 19, 2002	Palomar	NEAT	·	2.7 km	MPC · JPL
322246	2011 CR_{85}	—	October 29, 2003	Kitt Peak	Spacewatch	·	3.5 km	MPC · JPL
322247	2011 CV_{85}	—	September 19, 2001	Socorro	LINEAR	CYB	6.2 km	MPC · JPL
322248	2011 CE_{86}	—	September 19, 2003	Kitt Peak	Spacewatch	NAE	3.4 km	MPC · JPL
322249	2011 CR_{86}	—	October 9, 2004	Kitt Peak	Spacewatch	AGN	1.5 km	MPC · JPL
322250	2011 CK_{88}	—	March 2, 2006	Kitt Peak	Spacewatch	·	2.8 km	MPC · JPL
322251	2011 CN_{88}	—	August 22, 2003	Campo Imperatore	CINEOS	·	5.3 km	MPC · JPL
322252	2011 CR_{116}	—	March 15, 2007	Mount Lemmon	Mount Lemmon Survey	PAD	1.8 km	MPC · JPL
322253	2011 DT_{12}	—	March 3, 2000	Apache Point	SDSS	MAS	920 m	MPC · JPL
322254	2011 DG_{19}	—	March 14, 2007	Kitt Peak	Spacewatch	·	2.0 km	MPC · JPL
322255	2011 DP_{21}	—	July 25, 1995	Kitt Peak	Spacewatch	·	1.8 km	MPC · JPL
322256	2011 DN_{22}	—	April 5, 2003	Kitt Peak	Spacewatch	·	1.4 km	MPC · JPL
322257	2011 DH_{29}	—	April 20, 1993	Kitt Peak	Spacewatch	·	2.9 km	MPC · JPL
322258	2011 DK_{41}	—	April 28, 2007	Kitt Peak	Spacewatch	·	2.2 km	MPC · JPL
322259	2011 DW_{41}	—	March 3, 2000	Socorro	LINEAR	·	4.1 km	MPC · JPL
322260	2011 DV_{49}	—	December 11, 1998	Kitt Peak	Spacewatch	EOS	3.2 km	MPC · JPL
322261	2011 EJ_{7}	—	October 3, 2002	Socorro	LINEAR	HYG	3.8 km	MPC · JPL
322262	2011 EP_{9}	—	December 28, 2005	Mount Lemmon	Mount Lemmon Survey	·	1.5 km	MPC · JPL
322263	2011 EV_{13}	—	September 26, 2005	Kitt Peak	Spacewatch	·	1.7 km	MPC · JPL
322264	2011 EK_{15}	—	September 19, 2003	Kitt Peak	Spacewatch	(21885)	3.8 km	MPC · JPL
322265	2011 EY_{16}	—	November 20, 2003	Socorro	LINEAR	HYG	4.0 km	MPC · JPL
322266	2011 ES_{25}	—	October 10, 1997	Kitt Peak	Spacewatch	·	6.3 km	MPC · JPL
322267	2011 ET_{26}	—	March 23, 1995	Kitt Peak	Spacewatch	·	1.1 km	MPC · JPL
322268	2011 EF_{27}	—	February 27, 2006	Kitt Peak	Spacewatch	·	2.7 km	MPC · JPL
322269	2011 EN_{35}	—	August 13, 1993	Kitt Peak	Spacewatch	KOR	1.8 km	MPC · JPL
322270	2011 ES_{35}	—	December 30, 2005	Kitt Peak	Spacewatch	·	2.7 km	MPC · JPL
322271	2011 EH_{42}	—	October 9, 2008	Kitt Peak	Spacewatch	·	4.6 km	MPC · JPL
322272	2011 EK_{44}	—	June 18, 2002	Palomar	NEAT	·	3.7 km	MPC · JPL
322273	2011 EH_{54}	—	November 4, 2004	Kitt Peak	Spacewatch	·	2.0 km	MPC · JPL
322274	2011 EP_{63}	—	December 10, 2009	Mount Lemmon	Mount Lemmon Survey	·	2.9 km	MPC · JPL
322275	2011 ED_{68}	—	September 16, 2003	Kitt Peak	Spacewatch	·	2.4 km	MPC · JPL
322276	2011 ED_{74}	—	March 13, 1996	Kitt Peak	Spacewatch	·	3.0 km	MPC · JPL
322277	2011 EF_{83}	—	March 14, 2004	Kitt Peak	Spacewatch	·	960 m	MPC · JPL
322278	2011 FY_{5}	—	March 17, 1996	Kitt Peak	Spacewatch	·	1.3 km	MPC · JPL
322279	2011 FE_{9}	—	January 16, 2005	Mauna Kea	Veillet, C.	·	2.1 km	MPC · JPL
322280	2011 FN_{9}	—	October 5, 2004	Kitt Peak	Spacewatch	·	1.7 km	MPC · JPL
322281	2011 FL_{11}	—	October 5, 2003	Kitt Peak	Spacewatch	KOR	2.0 km	MPC · JPL
322282	2011 FO_{13}	—	April 7, 2006	Kitt Peak	Spacewatch	·	2.8 km	MPC · JPL
322283	2011 FK_{14}	—	September 12, 2001	Kitt Peak	Spacewatch	CYB	4.0 km	MPC · JPL
322284	2011 FR_{16}	—	February 11, 2004	Palomar	NEAT	·	880 m	MPC · JPL
322285	2011 FL_{17}	—	January 8, 2002	Kitt Peak	Spacewatch	·	2.1 km	MPC · JPL
322286	2011 FM_{28}	—	September 28, 2003	Kitt Peak	Spacewatch	·	1.9 km	MPC · JPL
322287	2011 FV_{31}	—	April 4, 2005	Mount Lemmon	Mount Lemmon Survey	·	3.4 km	MPC · JPL
322288	2011 FQ_{34}	—	October 10, 1999	Kitt Peak	Spacewatch	·	2.1 km	MPC · JPL
322289	2011 FY_{37}	—	October 30, 2005	Catalina	CSS	V	940 m	MPC · JPL
322290	2011 FV_{42}	—	September 4, 2008	Kitt Peak	Spacewatch	PAD	2.5 km	MPC · JPL
322291	2011 FE_{45}	—	March 12, 2000	Kitt Peak	Spacewatch	·	2.4 km	MPC · JPL
322292	2011 FS_{46}	—	September 4, 2007	Catalina	CSS	EOS	2.4 km	MPC · JPL
322293	2011 FT_{46}	—	November 30, 2003	Kitt Peak	Spacewatch	·	2.4 km	MPC · JPL
322294	2011 FU_{56}	—	January 19, 1996	Kitt Peak	Spacewatch	AGN	1.5 km	MPC · JPL
322295	2011 FG_{59}	—	November 14, 1995	Kitt Peak	Spacewatch	·	2.1 km	MPC · JPL
322296	2011 FW_{60}	—	October 12, 1999	Kitt Peak	Spacewatch	·	2.1 km	MPC · JPL
322297	2011 FK_{69}	—	May 21, 2001	Kitt Peak	Spacewatch	EOS	3.2 km	MPC · JPL
322298	2011 FL_{69}	—	January 13, 2000	Kitt Peak	Spacewatch	·	3.0 km	MPC · JPL
322299	2011 FQ_{74}	—	March 21, 2004	Kitt Peak	Spacewatch	·	1.1 km	MPC · JPL
322300	2011 FG_{82}	—	August 30, 1998	Kitt Peak	Spacewatch	KOR	1.6 km	MPC · JPL

== 322301–322400 ==
back to top

Designation			Discovery			Properties		Ref
Permanent	Provisional	Named after	Date	Site	Discoverer(s)	Category	Diam.	Ref
322301	2011 FU_{82}	—	February 27, 2000	Kitt Peak	Spacewatch	·	2.7 km	MPC · JPL
322302	2011 FM_{104}	—	June 28, 2001	Kitt Peak	Spacewatch	·	3.1 km	MPC · JPL
322303	2011 FN_{114}	—	September 7, 2008	Catalina	CSS	·	2.7 km	MPC · JPL
322304	2011 FW_{120}	—	April 29, 2000	Socorro	LINEAR	·	3.1 km	MPC · JPL
322305	2011 FA_{122}	—	October 16, 1977	Palomar	C. J. van Houten, I. van Houten-Groeneveld, T. Gehrels	·	1.1 km	MPC · JPL
322306	2011 FR_{136}	—	October 7, 1999	Kitt Peak	Spacewatch	HOF	3.1 km	MPC · JPL
322307	2011 FJ_{140}	—	October 8, 1999	Kitt Peak	Spacewatch	·	2.2 km	MPC · JPL
322308	2011 FR_{140}	—	March 15, 2007	Mount Lemmon	Mount Lemmon Survey	·	1.4 km	MPC · JPL
322309	2011 FC_{141}	—	October 15, 2004	Kitt Peak	Spacewatch	·	2.4 km	MPC · JPL
322310	2011 FA_{143}	—	August 9, 2004	Anderson Mesa	LONEOS	NYS	1.7 km	MPC · JPL
322311	2011 FM_{144}	—	April 14, 2002	Kitt Peak	Spacewatch	·	3.0 km	MPC · JPL
322312	2011 FL_{147}	—	April 5, 2002	Palomar	NEAT	·	3.8 km	MPC · JPL
322313	2011 FO_{148}	—	October 2, 2000	Kitt Peak	Spacewatch	·	1.6 km	MPC · JPL
322314	2011 FX_{149}	—	October 4, 1999	Kitt Peak	Spacewatch	·	2.6 km	MPC · JPL
322315	2011 FR_{153}	—	December 19, 2009	Kitt Peak	Spacewatch	·	1.6 km	MPC · JPL
322316	2011 GG	—	January 27, 2010	WISE	WISE	L4	12 km	MPC · JPL
322317	2011 GB_{2}	—	April 23, 2007	Kitt Peak	Spacewatch	·	1.4 km	MPC · JPL
322318	2011 GC_{5}	—	September 3, 2007	Catalina	CSS	·	2.7 km	MPC · JPL
322319	2011 GX_{13}	—	July 10, 2005	Kitt Peak	Spacewatch	·	830 m	MPC · JPL
322320	2011 GB_{17}	—	October 29, 2002	Kitt Peak	Spacewatch	VER	5.2 km	MPC · JPL
322321	2011 GJ_{27}	—	March 14, 2007	Catalina	CSS	·	1.6 km	MPC · JPL
322322	2011 GF_{31}	—	October 8, 2004	Kitt Peak	Spacewatch	·	1.5 km	MPC · JPL
322323	2011 GG_{55}	—	January 23, 2006	Mount Lemmon	Mount Lemmon Survey	·	1.7 km	MPC · JPL
322324	2011 GR_{64}	—	January 23, 2006	Kitt Peak	Spacewatch	·	2.0 km	MPC · JPL
322325	2011 GU_{69}	—	August 6, 2004	Campo Imperatore	CINEOS	·	1.6 km	MPC · JPL
322326	2011 GZ_{71}	—	September 23, 2008	Kitt Peak	Spacewatch	·	4.1 km	MPC · JPL
322327	2011 GV_{72}	—	March 5, 2006	Kitt Peak	Spacewatch	·	1.9 km	MPC · JPL
322328	2011 GT_{78}	—	September 7, 1999	Kitt Peak	Spacewatch	·	1.9 km	MPC · JPL
322329	2011 GO_{84}	—	September 3, 1999	Kitt Peak	Spacewatch	·	2.1 km	MPC · JPL
322330	2011 HV_{8}	—	March 14, 2001	Prescott	P. G. Comba	·	2.8 km	MPC · JPL
322331	2011 HH_{12}	—	February 17, 2010	Catalina	CSS	·	4.4 km	MPC · JPL
322332	2011 HP_{13}	—	June 5, 1995	Kitt Peak	Spacewatch	·	4.6 km	MPC · JPL
322333	2011 HV_{22}	—	March 3, 2000	Socorro	LINEAR	EOS	2.5 km	MPC · JPL
322334	2011 HS_{24}	—	March 4, 2005	Kitt Peak	Spacewatch	THM	2.4 km	MPC · JPL
322335	2011 HS_{27}	—	November 10, 2004	Kitt Peak	Spacewatch	·	3.4 km	MPC · JPL
322336	2011 HH_{28}	—	March 11, 2005	Anderson Mesa	LONEOS	EOS	3.5 km	MPC · JPL
322337	2011 HZ_{31}	—	November 24, 2003	Kitt Peak	Spacewatch	EOS	2.6 km	MPC · JPL
322338	2011 HE_{32}	—	April 24, 1995	Kitt Peak	Spacewatch	·	3.3 km	MPC · JPL
322339	2011 HR_{35}	—	December 19, 2003	Kitt Peak	Spacewatch	·	3.4 km	MPC · JPL
322340	2011 HP_{38}	—	January 24, 2007	Mount Lemmon	Mount Lemmon Survey	·	720 m	MPC · JPL
322341	2011 HR_{44}	—	November 24, 2008	Kitt Peak	Spacewatch	·	4.2 km	MPC · JPL
322342	2011 HN_{63}	—	May 25, 2006	Mount Lemmon	Mount Lemmon Survey	·	2.6 km	MPC · JPL
322343	2011 HW_{73}	—	March 11, 2005	Anderson Mesa	LONEOS	·	4.8 km	MPC · JPL
322344	2011 HU_{74}	—	February 1, 1995	Kitt Peak	Spacewatch	·	1.8 km	MPC · JPL
322345	2011 HD_{77}	—	October 26, 2008	Mount Lemmon	Mount Lemmon Survey	·	3.0 km	MPC · JPL
322346	2011 HT_{83}	—	December 10, 2004	Kitt Peak	Spacewatch	·	2.8 km	MPC · JPL
322347	2011 HM_{84}	—	December 3, 2002	Palomar	NEAT	·	1.1 km	MPC · JPL
322348	2011 HJ_{89}	—	October 5, 2002	Apache Point	SDSS	·	3.2 km	MPC · JPL
322349	2011 JN_{11}	—	January 5, 2006	Kitt Peak	Spacewatch	·	1.5 km	MPC · JPL
322350	2011 JX_{11}	—	April 5, 2000	Socorro	LINEAR	·	1.4 km	MPC · JPL
322351	2011 JU_{16}	—	April 1, 2005	Kitt Peak	Spacewatch	·	3.8 km	MPC · JPL
322352	2011 JP_{20}	—	February 9, 2005	Mount Lemmon	Mount Lemmon Survey	KOR ·	3.9 km	MPC · JPL
322353	2011 JF_{21}	—	July 3, 2003	Kitt Peak	Spacewatch	·	2.6 km	MPC · JPL
322354	2011 JG_{28}	—	August 26, 2001	Ondřejov	P. Kušnirák, P. Pravec	·	4.4 km	MPC · JPL
322355	2011 KZ_{2}	—	October 20, 2001	Socorro	LINEAR	NYS	1.3 km	MPC · JPL
322356	2011 KC_{4}	—	August 31, 2005	Kitt Peak	Spacewatch	3:2	6.5 km	MPC · JPL
322357	2011 KE_{4}	—	February 28, 2005	Catalina	CSS	·	4.7 km	MPC · JPL
322358	2011 KF_{16}	—	August 7, 2001	Haleakala	NEAT	·	5.2 km	MPC · JPL
322359	2011 KG_{21}	—	November 20, 1992	Kitt Peak	Spacewatch	·	1.6 km	MPC · JPL
322360	2011 KE_{22}	—	March 25, 2000	Kitt Peak	Spacewatch	·	2.6 km	MPC · JPL
322361	2011 KJ_{22}	—	January 19, 2001	Kitt Peak	Spacewatch	·	2.5 km	MPC · JPL
322362	2011 KB_{29}	—	May 15, 2004	Socorro	LINEAR	·	800 m	MPC · JPL
322363	2011 KY_{29}	—	February 7, 2002	Kitt Peak	Spacewatch	·	1.6 km	MPC · JPL
322364	2011 KA_{35}	—	October 21, 2007	Mount Lemmon	Mount Lemmon Survey	·	5.1 km	MPC · JPL
322365	2011 KL_{44}	—	January 28, 2000	Kitt Peak	Spacewatch	·	2.4 km	MPC · JPL
322366	2011 KQ_{45}	—	October 27, 2008	Mount Lemmon	Mount Lemmon Survey	·	3.7 km	MPC · JPL
322367	2011 LC_{3}	—	August 17, 2002	Palomar	NEAT	·	2.1 km	MPC · JPL
322368	2011 LU_{4}	—	April 28, 2007	Kitt Peak	Spacewatch	·	1.4 km	MPC · JPL
322369	2011 LF_{5}	—	January 15, 1999	Kitt Peak	Spacewatch	EOS	2.8 km	MPC · JPL
322370	2011 LF_{9}	—	March 17, 2004	Kitt Peak	Spacewatch	·	770 m	MPC · JPL
322371	2011 LR_{11}	—	September 18, 2003	Kitt Peak	Spacewatch	·	2.1 km	MPC · JPL
322372	2011 LP_{13}	—	September 3, 2007	Catalina	CSS	KOR	1.8 km	MPC · JPL
322373	2011 LX_{13}	—	September 12, 2001	Socorro	LINEAR	·	3.9 km	MPC · JPL
322374	2011 LG_{22}	—	October 19, 2003	Kitt Peak	Spacewatch	AGN	1.4 km	MPC · JPL
322375	2011 LQ_{22}	—	October 29, 2003	Kitt Peak	Spacewatch	AGN	1.5 km	MPC · JPL
322376	2011 LU_{24}	—	April 25, 2000	Anderson Mesa	LONEOS	·	5.2 km	MPC · JPL
322377	2011 LJ_{26}	—	November 26, 1995	Kitt Peak	Spacewatch	HNS	1.8 km	MPC · JPL
322378	2011 MV_{9}	—	March 5, 2006	Mount Lemmon	Mount Lemmon Survey	L5	20 km	MPC · JPL
322379	2011 OZ_{12}	—	October 21, 2001	Socorro	LINEAR	L5	10 km	MPC · JPL
322380	2011 OB_{25}	—	July 21, 1996	Haleakala	NEAT	MAS	930 m	MPC · JPL
322381	2011 OW_{54}	—	January 9, 2002	Kitt Peak	Spacewatch	·	4.7 km	MPC · JPL
322382	2011 QD_{6}	—	May 9, 2004	Kitt Peak	Spacewatch	·	4.6 km	MPC · JPL
322383	2011 QB_{10}	—	February 11, 2004	Palomar	NEAT	AGN	1.7 km	MPC · JPL
322384	2011 QR_{17}	—	September 28, 2002	Palomar	NEAT	AGN	1.5 km	MPC · JPL
322385	2011 QJ_{22}	—	October 4, 2004	Kitt Peak	Spacewatch	·	1.2 km	MPC · JPL
322386	2011 QY_{34}	—	December 17, 2001	Socorro	LINEAR	·	2.7 km	MPC · JPL
322387	2011 QT_{35}	—	October 31, 2002	Socorro	LINEAR	·	2.4 km	MPC · JPL
322388	2011 QY_{38}	—	April 9, 2003	Kitt Peak	Spacewatch	MAS	880 m	MPC · JPL
322389	2011 QX_{39}	—	January 27, 2004	Kitt Peak	Spacewatch	·	2.5 km	MPC · JPL
322390 Planes de Son	2011 QN_{42}	Planes de Son	June 9, 2004	Kitt Peak	Spacewatch	·	3.8 km	MPC · JPL
322391	2011 QM_{47}	—	October 13, 2004	Kitt Peak	Spacewatch	·	1.6 km	MPC · JPL
322392	2011 QU_{50}	—	November 20, 2001	Socorro	LINEAR	·	4.5 km	MPC · JPL
322393	2011 QA_{57}	—	September 14, 2007	Mount Lemmon	Mount Lemmon Survey	·	1.4 km	MPC · JPL
322394	2011 QU_{58}	—	December 6, 2007	Mount Lemmon	Mount Lemmon Survey	KOR	1.6 km	MPC · JPL
322395	2011 QY_{58}	—	May 2, 2005	Kitt Peak	Spacewatch	·	2.3 km	MPC · JPL
322396	2011 QB_{74}	—	May 3, 2005	Kitt Peak	Spacewatch	KOR	1.6 km	MPC · JPL
322397	2011 QQ_{83}	—	June 19, 2006	Mount Lemmon	Mount Lemmon Survey	KOR	2.0 km	MPC · JPL
322398	2011 QR_{94}	—	October 10, 1999	Kitt Peak	Spacewatch	·	1.5 km	MPC · JPL
322399	2011 QM_{95}	—	September 25, 2006	Catalina	CSS	·	4.6 km	MPC · JPL
322400	2011 QZ_{96}	—	May 12, 2007	Mount Lemmon	Mount Lemmon Survey	·	770 m	MPC · JPL

== 322401–322500 ==
back to top

Designation			Discovery			Properties		Ref
Permanent	Provisional	Named after	Date	Site	Discoverer(s)	Category	Diam.	Ref
322401	2011 QC_{97}	—	April 24, 2000	Kitt Peak	Spacewatch	·	4.7 km	MPC · JPL
322402	2011 RE_{6}	—	October 6, 2008	Kitt Peak	Spacewatch	·	680 m	MPC · JPL
322403	2011 RH_{10}	—	June 5, 2005	Kitt Peak	Spacewatch	·	3.3 km	MPC · JPL
322404	2011 RD_{14}	—	April 27, 2009	Mount Lemmon	Mount Lemmon Survey	·	3.8 km	MPC · JPL
322405	2011 RB_{18}	—	December 13, 2002	Palomar	NEAT	KOR	1.4 km	MPC · JPL
322406	2011 SX_{26}	—	February 4, 2000	Kitt Peak	Spacewatch	·	2.8 km	MPC · JPL
322407	2011 SC_{36}	—	November 15, 2006	Kitt Peak	Spacewatch	·	2.7 km	MPC · JPL
322408	2011 SX_{36}	—	February 8, 2008	Mount Lemmon	Mount Lemmon Survey	·	3.2 km	MPC · JPL
322409	2011 SD_{51}	—	July 29, 2005	Palomar	NEAT	EMA	4.1 km	MPC · JPL
322410	2011 SJ_{57}	—	April 2, 2006	Kitt Peak	Spacewatch	·	1.2 km	MPC · JPL
322411	2011 SX_{66}	—	September 16, 2006	Kitt Peak	Spacewatch	·	2.7 km	MPC · JPL
322412	2011 SX_{67}	—	July 8, 2003	Kitt Peak	Spacewatch	·	1.8 km	MPC · JPL
322413	2011 SO_{83}	—	August 28, 2006	Catalina	CSS	·	2.1 km	MPC · JPL
322414	2011 SM_{87}	—	September 7, 2000	Kitt Peak	Spacewatch	·	3.6 km	MPC · JPL
322415	2011 SA_{88}	—	August 28, 2006	Catalina	CSS	·	2.1 km	MPC · JPL
322416	2011 SQ_{92}	—	February 8, 1995	Kitt Peak	Spacewatch	·	2.6 km	MPC · JPL
322417	2011 SV_{96}	—	October 18, 1996	Kitt Peak	Spacewatch	·	1.3 km	MPC · JPL
322418	2011 SX_{102}	—	October 8, 2002	Anderson Mesa	LONEOS	·	2.6 km	MPC · JPL
322419	2011 SR_{106}	—	November 4, 2004	Catalina	CSS	·	1.2 km	MPC · JPL
322420	2011 ST_{108}	—	March 19, 1999	Kitt Peak	Spacewatch	MAS	1.0 km	MPC · JPL
322421	2011 SY_{125}	—	September 28, 2000	Socorro	LINEAR	·	4.8 km	MPC · JPL
322422	2011 SV_{131}	—	April 18, 2001	Kitt Peak	Spacewatch	·	1.8 km	MPC · JPL
322423	2011 SJ_{144}	—	August 9, 2007	Kitt Peak	Spacewatch	·	1.4 km	MPC · JPL
322424	2011 SZ_{154}	—	March 10, 2005	Mount Lemmon	Mount Lemmon Survey	NEM	2.6 km	MPC · JPL
322425	2011 SB_{170}	—	November 20, 2004	Kitt Peak	Spacewatch	·	1.2 km	MPC · JPL
322426	2011 SQ_{180}	—	March 14, 2000	Kitt Peak	Spacewatch	·	2.2 km	MPC · JPL
322427	2011 ST_{181}	—	October 8, 2004	Kitt Peak	Spacewatch	·	1.4 km	MPC · JPL
322428	2011 SS_{196}	—	February 17, 2004	Kitt Peak	Spacewatch	KOR	1.5 km	MPC · JPL
322429	2011 SW_{197}	—	November 5, 2007	Kitt Peak	Spacewatch	·	1.9 km	MPC · JPL
322430	2011 SR_{203}	—	May 8, 2006	Mount Lemmon	Mount Lemmon Survey	·	2.8 km	MPC · JPL
322431	2011 SP_{208}	—	November 18, 2001	Apache Point	SDSS	·	2.4 km	MPC · JPL
322432	2011 SQ_{214}	—	March 20, 2002	Kitt Peak	Spacewatch	V	820 m	MPC · JPL
322433	2011 SE_{220}	—	July 7, 2007	Reedy Creek	J. Broughton	NYS	1.5 km	MPC · JPL
322434	2011 SM_{221}	—	April 9, 2005	Kitt Peak	Spacewatch	·	2.0 km	MPC · JPL
322435	2011 SH_{228}	—	January 14, 2002	Socorro	LINEAR	·	1.6 km	MPC · JPL
322436	2011 SP_{247}	—	August 24, 2005	Palomar	NEAT	·	3.0 km	MPC · JPL
322437	2011 SK_{256}	—	September 25, 2005	Kitt Peak	Spacewatch	·	3.7 km	MPC · JPL
322438	2011 SD_{257}	—	November 17, 2007	Mount Lemmon	Mount Lemmon Survey	·	1.3 km	MPC · JPL
322439	2011 SS_{257}	—	January 11, 2003	Kitt Peak	Spacewatch	·	1.4 km	MPC · JPL
322440	2011 SW_{257}	—	August 23, 2006	Palomar	NEAT	·	3.3 km	MPC · JPL
322441	2011 SO_{258}	—	December 24, 1998	Kitt Peak	Spacewatch	AST	3.4 km	MPC · JPL
322442	2011 TT_{2}	—	September 19, 1995	Kitt Peak	Spacewatch	·	5.1 km	MPC · JPL
322443	2011 TT_{10}	—	April 7, 1999	Kitt Peak	Spacewatch	·	1.5 km	MPC · JPL
322444	2011 TK_{13}	—	October 16, 2003	Palomar	NEAT	·	2.0 km	MPC · JPL
322445	2011 TS_{14}	—	July 5, 2005	Mount Lemmon	Mount Lemmon Survey	·	2.4 km	MPC · JPL
322446	2011 UU_{2}	—	September 14, 2002	Palomar	NEAT	·	1.7 km	MPC · JPL
322447	2011 UF_{7}	—	September 28, 2006	Mount Lemmon	Mount Lemmon Survey	·	2.0 km	MPC · JPL
322448	2011 UZ_{8}	—	January 16, 2008	Mount Lemmon	Mount Lemmon Survey	·	5.6 km	MPC · JPL
322449	2011 UR_{9}	—	September 24, 2000	Socorro	LINEAR	·	1.3 km	MPC · JPL
322450	2011 UD_{13}	—	January 17, 2007	Kitt Peak	Spacewatch	(260) · CYB	3.9 km	MPC · JPL
322451	2011 UV_{13}	—	January 9, 2006	Mount Lemmon	Mount Lemmon Survey	V	980 m	MPC · JPL
322452	2011 UF_{17}	—	November 5, 2007	Mount Lemmon	Mount Lemmon Survey	·	2.5 km	MPC · JPL
322453	2011 UW_{20}	—	January 21, 2002	Palomar	NEAT	·	1.8 km	MPC · JPL
322454	2011 UV_{33}	—	October 27, 2006	Mount Lemmon	Mount Lemmon Survey	·	5.1 km	MPC · JPL
322455	2011 UG_{36}	—	February 14, 2001	Kleť	M. Tichý	MAS	800 m	MPC · JPL
322456	2011 UQ_{47}	—	October 1, 2000	Socorro	LINEAR	·	2.9 km	MPC · JPL
322457	2011 US_{47}	—	January 13, 2002	Kitt Peak	Spacewatch	·	3.0 km	MPC · JPL
322458	2011 UA_{52}	—	September 27, 2005	Kitt Peak	Spacewatch	·	3.2 km	MPC · JPL
322459	2011 UF_{53}	—	October 28, 1995	Kitt Peak	Spacewatch	EOS	2.2 km	MPC · JPL
322460	2011 UE_{55}	—	March 29, 2000	Kitt Peak	Spacewatch	·	2.0 km	MPC · JPL
322461	2011 UA_{56}	—	February 11, 2004	Kitt Peak	Spacewatch	·	2.1 km	MPC · JPL
322462	2011 UV_{57}	—	March 10, 2005	Mount Lemmon	Mount Lemmon Survey	·	1.7 km	MPC · JPL
322463	2011 UR_{61}	—	March 11, 2005	Mount Lemmon	Mount Lemmon Survey	·	1.6 km	MPC · JPL
322464	2011 UP_{107}	—	July 28, 2005	Palomar	NEAT	·	2.6 km	MPC · JPL
322465	2011 UB_{113}	—	September 27, 2005	Kitt Peak	Spacewatch	·	2.7 km	MPC · JPL
322466	2011 US_{114}	—	November 17, 2006	Kitt Peak	Spacewatch	EOS	2.6 km	MPC · JPL
322467	2011 UF_{129}	—	November 25, 2005	Catalina	CSS	SYL · CYB	3.9 km	MPC · JPL
322468	2011 UP_{138}	—	June 23, 2005	Palomar	NEAT	·	3.2 km	MPC · JPL
322469	2011 UT_{148}	—	September 7, 2000	Kitt Peak	Spacewatch	·	1.6 km	MPC · JPL
322470	2011 UZ_{177}	—	June 12, 2005	Kitt Peak	Spacewatch	·	2.0 km	MPC · JPL
322471	2011 UQ_{187}	—	March 11, 2003	Palomar	NEAT	·	3.4 km	MPC · JPL
322472	2011 UT_{187}	—	November 18, 2006	Kitt Peak	Spacewatch	·	4.1 km	MPC · JPL
322473	2011 UZ_{187}	—	October 17, 2003	Kitt Peak	Spacewatch	·	1.8 km	MPC · JPL
322474	2011 UF_{192}	—	September 25, 1995	Kitt Peak	Spacewatch	·	1.8 km	MPC · JPL
322475	2011 UZ_{194}	—	August 31, 2005	Anderson Mesa	LONEOS	·	4.1 km	MPC · JPL
322476	2011 UR_{202}	—	October 2, 2006	Kitt Peak	Spacewatch	HOF	2.5 km	MPC · JPL
322477	2011 UO_{203}	—	May 2, 2003	Kitt Peak	Spacewatch	·	1.5 km	MPC · JPL
322478	2011 UH_{206}	—	January 8, 2002	Socorro	LINEAR	NYS	2.9 km	MPC · JPL
322479	2011 UY_{216}	—	November 18, 1998	Kitt Peak	Spacewatch	·	820 m	MPC · JPL
322480	2011 UK_{221}	—	October 18, 2007	Kitt Peak	Spacewatch	·	1.3 km	MPC · JPL
322481	2011 UV_{231}	—	August 30, 2005	Kitt Peak	Spacewatch	·	2.6 km	MPC · JPL
322482	2011 UN_{239}	—	November 13, 2002	Palomar	NEAT	PAD	3.4 km	MPC · JPL
322483	2011 UN_{247}	—	October 9, 1999	Kitt Peak	Spacewatch	·	3.2 km	MPC · JPL
322484	2011 UE_{250}	—	May 6, 2005	Catalina	CSS	·	1.9 km	MPC · JPL
322485	2011 UX_{251}	—	September 2, 1998	Kitt Peak	Spacewatch	·	1.9 km	MPC · JPL
322486	2011 UA_{252}	—	December 1, 2008	Mount Lemmon	Mount Lemmon Survey	·	1.1 km	MPC · JPL
322487	2011 UN_{253}	—	September 3, 2000	Kitt Peak	Spacewatch	NYS	1.0 km	MPC · JPL
322488	2011 UA_{268}	—	December 3, 2004	Kitt Peak	Spacewatch	·	1.6 km	MPC · JPL
322489	2011 UJ_{269}	—	October 7, 2000	Anderson Mesa	LONEOS	·	3.4 km	MPC · JPL
322490	2011 UT_{296}	—	October 23, 2006	Mount Lemmon	Mount Lemmon Survey	EOS	1.9 km	MPC · JPL
322491	2011 UE_{297}	—	August 20, 2001	Cerro Tololo	Deep Ecliptic Survey	AST	2.0 km	MPC · JPL
322492	2011 UZ_{300}	—	November 18, 2007	Kitt Peak	Spacewatch	·	1.7 km	MPC · JPL
322493	2011 UN_{302}	—	June 11, 2004	Kitt Peak	Spacewatch	·	4.3 km	MPC · JPL
322494	2011 UN_{322}	—	December 5, 2003	Socorro	LINEAR	·	3.2 km	MPC · JPL
322495	2011 UP_{362}	—	January 17, 2005	Kitt Peak	Spacewatch	·	1.8 km	MPC · JPL
322496	2011 UL_{374}	—	May 21, 2006	Kitt Peak	Spacewatch	·	2.0 km	MPC · JPL
322497	2011 UV_{390}	—	February 28, 2008	Mount Lemmon	Mount Lemmon Survey	·	2.2 km	MPC · JPL
322498	2011 UC_{398}	—	March 16, 2005	Catalina	CSS	·	2.4 km	MPC · JPL
322499	2011 UV_{399}	—	February 12, 2008	Mount Lemmon	Mount Lemmon Survey	·	3.3 km	MPC · JPL
322500	2011 VX_{2}	—	November 20, 2001	Socorro	LINEAR	·	2.1 km	MPC · JPL

== 322501–322600 ==
back to top

Designation			Discovery			Properties		Ref
Permanent	Provisional	Named after	Date	Site	Discoverer(s)	Category	Diam.	Ref
322501	2011 VO_{9}	—	February 13, 2008	Catalina	CSS	·	4.2 km	MPC · JPL
322502	2011 WW_{2}	—	September 14, 2006	Catalina	CSS	·	2.7 km	MPC · JPL
322503	2011 WH_{9}	—	November 7, 2007	Kitt Peak	Spacewatch	·	940 m	MPC · JPL
322504	2011 WF_{14}	—	November 19, 1995	Haleakala	AMOS	·	3.6 km	MPC · JPL
322505	2011 WC_{15}	—	April 12, 2004	Kitt Peak	Spacewatch	GEF	1.5 km	MPC · JPL
322506	2011 WR_{16}	—	November 12, 2007	Mount Lemmon	Mount Lemmon Survey	(5)	2.2 km	MPC · JPL
322507	2011 WO_{27}	—	April 4, 2008	Catalina	CSS	·	3.3 km	MPC · JPL
322508	2011 WD_{63}	—	September 15, 2006	Kitt Peak	Spacewatch	·	1.4 km	MPC · JPL
322509	2011 WE_{65}	—	September 14, 2002	Palomar	NEAT	·	1.5 km	MPC · JPL
322510 Heinrichgrüber	2011 WR_{68}	Heinrichgrüber	October 10, 1990	Tautenburg	F. Börngen, L. D. Schmadel	·	1.8 km	MPC · JPL
322511	2011 WN_{78}	—	October 16, 2006	Catalina	CSS	·	3.0 km	MPC · JPL
322512	2011 WJ_{98}	—	April 4, 1998	Kitt Peak	Spacewatch	NYS	1.6 km	MPC · JPL
322513	2011 WZ_{104}	—	November 4, 2005	Mount Lemmon	Mount Lemmon Survey	·	2.9 km	MPC · JPL
322514	2011 WK_{114}	—	September 24, 2006	Anderson Mesa	LONEOS	·	3.1 km	MPC · JPL
322515	2011 WQ_{141}	—	November 11, 2006	Kitt Peak	Spacewatch	·	4.0 km	MPC · JPL
322516	2011 WX_{148}	—	December 4, 2008	Socorro	LINEAR	H	950 m	MPC · JPL
322517	2011 YH_{1}	—	March 11, 2002	Palomar	NEAT	·	970 m	MPC · JPL
322518	2011 YU_{2}	—	December 30, 2000	Socorro	LINEAR	·	4.9 km	MPC · JPL
322519	2011 YJ_{4}	—	June 17, 2006	Kitt Peak	Spacewatch	L4	10 km	MPC · JPL
322520	2011 YD_{8}	—	October 26, 2009	Mount Lemmon	Mount Lemmon Survey	L4	10 km	MPC · JPL
322521	2011 YK_{11}	—	December 5, 2005	Kitt Peak	Spacewatch	·	4.2 km	MPC · JPL
322522	2011 YM_{11}	—	December 31, 2002	Socorro	LINEAR	·	2.8 km	MPC · JPL
322523	2011 YX_{11}	—	September 18, 2001	Anderson Mesa	LONEOS	·	3.4 km	MPC · JPL
322524	2011 YS_{14}	—	March 18, 2004	Kitt Peak	Spacewatch	L4	10 km	MPC · JPL
322525	2011 YK_{15}	—	September 28, 2008	Catalina	CSS	L4	10 km	MPC · JPL
322526	2011 YZ_{16}	—	September 11, 2002	Palomar	NEAT	·	1.7 km	MPC · JPL
322527	2011 YD_{17}	—	September 18, 2006	Catalina	CSS	(5)	1.5 km	MPC · JPL
322528	2011 YG_{17}	—	September 19, 1995	Kitt Peak	Spacewatch	MAS	790 m	MPC · JPL
322529	2011 YG_{19}	—	October 22, 2005	Kitt Peak	Spacewatch	·	1.8 km	MPC · JPL
322530	2011 YS_{19}	—	September 22, 1995	Kitt Peak	Spacewatch	·	1.4 km	MPC · JPL
322531	2011 YP_{20}	—	March 12, 2002	Kitt Peak	Spacewatch	·	690 m	MPC · JPL
322532	2011 YQ_{20}	—	March 31, 2004	Siding Spring	R. H. McNaught	·	1.2 km	MPC · JPL
322533	2011 YC_{21}	—	July 6, 2005	Kitt Peak	Spacewatch	·	1.4 km	MPC · JPL
322534	2011 YD_{21}	—	October 21, 1995	Kitt Peak	Spacewatch	·	1.5 km	MPC · JPL
322535	2011 YO_{24}	—	January 7, 2005	Kitt Peak	Spacewatch	·	780 m	MPC · JPL
322536	2011 YS_{25}	—	April 12, 2002	Palomar	NEAT	·	4.4 km	MPC · JPL
322537	2011 YR_{26}	—	April 14, 2004	Kitt Peak	Spacewatch	·	2.8 km	MPC · JPL
322538	2011 YN_{27}	—	May 20, 2004	Kitt Peak	Spacewatch	L4	10 km	MPC · JPL
322539 Telšiai	2011 YS_{27}	Telšiai	October 17, 2006	Catalina	CSS	·	1.5 km	MPC · JPL
322540	2011 YR_{29}	—	September 15, 2007	Pla D'Arguines	R. Ferrando	L4 · ERY	10 km	MPC · JPL
322541	2011 YD_{31}	—	August 6, 2005	Palomar	NEAT	·	2.1 km	MPC · JPL
322542	2011 YY_{33}	—	September 30, 2006	Socorro	LINEAR	(5)	1.4 km	MPC · JPL
322543	2011 YZ_{34}	—	November 27, 2006	Mount Lemmon	Mount Lemmon Survey	·	4.3 km	MPC · JPL
322544	2011 YJ_{35}	—	August 28, 2005	Kitt Peak	Spacewatch	·	2.2 km	MPC · JPL
322545	2011 YM_{35}	—	November 25, 2006	Kitt Peak	Spacewatch	·	2.4 km	MPC · JPL
322546	2011 YP_{35}	—	September 17, 2009	Mount Lemmon	Mount Lemmon Survey	L4	7.0 km	MPC · JPL
322547	2011 YC_{37}	—	February 22, 2007	Kitt Peak	Spacewatch	·	3.1 km	MPC · JPL
322548	2011 YD_{37}	—	January 10, 1997	Kitt Peak	Spacewatch	NYS	1.2 km	MPC · JPL
322549	2011 YX_{37}	—	June 21, 2010	Mount Lemmon	Mount Lemmon Survey	·	2.0 km	MPC · JPL
322550	2011 YT_{45}	—	October 10, 2008	Mount Lemmon	Mount Lemmon Survey	L4	8.1 km	MPC · JPL
322551	2011 YC_{46}	—	September 11, 2004	Kitt Peak	Spacewatch	·	3.6 km	MPC · JPL
322552	2011 YT_{46}	—	March 31, 2003	Kitt Peak	Spacewatch	EOS	2.3 km	MPC · JPL
322553	2011 YQ_{50}	—	October 3, 2008	Mount Lemmon	Mount Lemmon Survey	L4	10 km	MPC · JPL
322554	2011 YO_{52}	—	January 22, 2006	Socorro	LINEAR	THB	4.2 km	MPC · JPL
322555	2011 YQ_{53}	—	September 19, 2007	Kitt Peak	Spacewatch	L4	8.1 km	MPC · JPL
322556	2011 YW_{53}	—	October 10, 2006	Palomar	NEAT	·	2.1 km	MPC · JPL
322557	2011 YY_{53}	—	October 13, 1999	Apache Point	SDSS	·	5.3 km	MPC · JPL
322558	2011 YC_{54}	—	June 22, 2004	Kitt Peak	Spacewatch	·	3.4 km	MPC · JPL
322559	2011 YH_{55}	—	May 9, 1996	Kitt Peak	Spacewatch	·	3.8 km	MPC · JPL
322560	2011 YK_{58}	—	January 16, 2010	WISE	WISE	L4	9.4 km	MPC · JPL
322561	2011 YL_{58}	—	December 11, 2006	Kitt Peak	Spacewatch	KOR	1.7 km	MPC · JPL
322562	2011 YH_{59}	—	March 31, 2001	Kitt Peak	Spacewatch	·	1.9 km	MPC · JPL
322563	2011 YN_{59}	—	May 5, 2008	Kitt Peak	Spacewatch	·	3.7 km	MPC · JPL
322564	2011 YX_{60}	—	January 23, 2004	Socorro	LINEAR	·	1.2 km	MPC · JPL
322565	2011 YZ_{60}	—	March 27, 2001	Kitt Peak	Spacewatch	·	1.4 km	MPC · JPL
322566	2011 YH_{63}	—	September 10, 2004	Socorro	LINEAR	EOS	2.4 km	MPC · JPL
322567	2011 YP_{63}	—	August 4, 2005	Palomar	NEAT	H	610 m	MPC · JPL
322568	2011 YF_{64}	—	March 31, 2003	Apache Point	SDSS	L4	8.7 km	MPC · JPL
322569	2011 YQ_{65}	—	September 14, 2007	Mauna Kea	P. A. Wiegert	L4	9.6 km	MPC · JPL
322570	2011 YG_{67}	—	March 31, 2003	Apache Point	SDSS	L4	10 km	MPC · JPL
322571	2011 YO_{73}	—	September 3, 2008	Kitt Peak	Spacewatch	L4	8.0 km	MPC · JPL
322572	2011 YW_{73}	—	May 4, 2005	Kitt Peak	Spacewatch	·	1.6 km	MPC · JPL
322573	2012 AL_{1}	—	October 10, 2002	Palomar	NEAT	EUN	1.5 km	MPC · JPL
322574 Werckmeister	2012 AS_{2}	Werckmeister	August 18, 1990	La Silla	E. W. Elst	·	1.6 km	MPC · JPL
322575	2012 AQ_{6}	—	January 16, 2005	Kitt Peak	Spacewatch	·	770 m	MPC · JPL
322576	2012 AX_{6}	—	March 10, 2005	Mount Lemmon	Mount Lemmon Survey	NYS	910 m	MPC · JPL
322577 Stephanhellmich	2012 AF_{7}	Stephanhellmich	January 31, 2006	Mount Lemmon	Mount Lemmon Survey	·	4.2 km	MPC · JPL
322578	2012 AJ_{7}	—	December 13, 2006	Kitt Peak	Spacewatch	·	2.8 km	MPC · JPL
322579	2012 AU_{7}	—	December 7, 2005	Kitt Peak	Spacewatch	VER	3.8 km	MPC · JPL
322580	2012 AQ_{9}	—	December 4, 2005	Kitt Peak	Spacewatch	·	3.9 km	MPC · JPL
322581	2012 AT_{9}	—	September 16, 2003	Kitt Peak	Spacewatch	·	940 m	MPC · JPL
322582	2012 AD_{13}	—	June 10, 2008	Kitt Peak	Spacewatch	·	3.9 km	MPC · JPL
322583	2012 AD_{19}	—	November 19, 2007	Mount Lemmon	Mount Lemmon Survey	·	820 m	MPC · JPL
322584	2012 BV	—	September 14, 2007	Mount Lemmon	Mount Lemmon Survey	L4	9.5 km	MPC · JPL
322585	2012 BS_{5}	—	August 27, 2005	Palomar	NEAT	·	2.8 km	MPC · JPL
322586	2012 BA_{12}	—	November 26, 2005	Catalina	CSS	·	4.6 km	MPC · JPL
322587	2012 BT_{12}	—	April 15, 2008	Mount Lemmon	Mount Lemmon Survey	·	4.1 km	MPC · JPL
322588	2012 BY_{14}	—	November 25, 2005	Catalina	CSS	EMA	5.1 km	MPC · JPL
322589	2012 BZ_{14}	—	November 30, 2003	Kitt Peak	Spacewatch	·	1.3 km	MPC · JPL
322590	2012 BM_{15}	—	November 29, 2005	Mount Lemmon	Mount Lemmon Survey	·	3.5 km	MPC · JPL
322591	2012 BS_{18}	—	September 21, 2003	Kitt Peak	Spacewatch	·	940 m	MPC · JPL
322592	2012 BU_{20}	—	December 11, 2006	Kitt Peak	Spacewatch	·	3.2 km	MPC · JPL
322593	2012 BE_{21}	—	October 4, 2004	Kitt Peak	Spacewatch	·	3.1 km	MPC · JPL
322594	2012 BG_{21}	—	December 17, 2007	Mount Lemmon	Mount Lemmon Survey	·	1.4 km	MPC · JPL
322595	2012 BT_{21}	—	October 19, 2006	Catalina	CSS	·	2.4 km	MPC · JPL
322596	2012 BG_{22}	—	October 19, 1995	Kitt Peak	Spacewatch	·	1.9 km	MPC · JPL
322597	2012 BZ_{22}	—	April 1, 2005	Kitt Peak	Spacewatch	NYS	1.3 km	MPC · JPL
322598	2012 BP_{24}	—	November 16, 2003	Kitt Peak	Spacewatch	NYS	1.5 km	MPC · JPL
322599	2012 BY_{24}	—	November 25, 2005	Catalina	CSS	·	4.1 km	MPC · JPL
322600	2012 BD_{26}	—	October 30, 1999	Kitt Peak	Spacewatch	·	3.0 km	MPC · JPL

== 322601–322700 ==
back to top

Designation			Discovery			Properties		Ref
Permanent	Provisional	Named after	Date	Site	Discoverer(s)	Category	Diam.	Ref
322601	2012 BX_{30}	—	October 9, 2004	Kitt Peak	Spacewatch	·	750 m	MPC · JPL
322602	2012 BV_{53}	—	July 24, 2003	Palomar	NEAT	·	1.2 km	MPC · JPL
322603	2012 BQ_{56}	—	February 19, 2001	Socorro	LINEAR	MAS	990 m	MPC · JPL
322604	2012 BA_{63}	—	November 23, 2006	Kitt Peak	Spacewatch	AGN	1.0 km	MPC · JPL
322605	2012 BO_{96}	—	February 2, 2001	Kitt Peak	Spacewatch	L4	10 km	MPC · JPL
322606	4714 P-L	—	September 24, 1960	Palomar	C. J. van Houten, I. van Houten-Groeneveld, T. Gehrels	·	2.9 km	MPC · JPL
322607	6185 P-L	—	September 24, 1960	Palomar	C. J. van Houten, I. van Houten-Groeneveld, T. Gehrels	·	2.7 km	MPC · JPL
322608	6363 P-L	—	September 24, 1960	Palomar	C. J. van Houten, I. van Houten-Groeneveld, T. Gehrels	NYS	1.3 km	MPC · JPL
322609	1406 T-2	—	September 29, 1973	Palomar	C. J. van Houten, I. van Houten-Groeneveld, T. Gehrels	·	860 m	MPC · JPL
322610	1438 T-2	—	September 30, 1973	Palomar	C. J. van Houten, I. van Houten-Groeneveld, T. Gehrels	·	4.4 km	MPC · JPL
322611	3506 T-3	—	October 16, 1977	Palomar	C. J. van Houten, I. van Houten-Groeneveld, T. Gehrels	·	780 m	MPC · JPL
322612	1989 SA_{14}	—	September 26, 1989	Calar Alto	J. M. Baur, K. Birkle	ADE	3.3 km	MPC · JPL
322613	1994 PV_{2}	—	August 10, 1994	La Silla	E. W. Elst	·	1.6 km	MPC · JPL
322614	1994 SY_{1}	—	September 27, 1994	Kitt Peak	Spacewatch	MAS	930 m	MPC · JPL
322615	1995 FJ_{18}	—	March 2, 1995	Kitt Peak	Spacewatch	·	1.6 km	MPC · JPL
322616	1995 GW_{6}	—	April 6, 1995	Kitt Peak	Spacewatch	·	1.9 km	MPC · JPL
322617	1995 SC_{25}	—	September 19, 1995	Kitt Peak	Spacewatch	KOR	1.4 km	MPC · JPL
322618	1995 SF_{31}	—	September 20, 1995	Kitt Peak	Spacewatch	·	2.3 km	MPC · JPL
322619	1995 SJ_{78}	—	September 30, 1995	Kitt Peak	Spacewatch	·	1.1 km	MPC · JPL
322620	1995 UJ_{60}	—	October 20, 1995	Kitt Peak	Spacewatch	KOR	1.4 km	MPC · JPL
322621	1995 WG_{14}	—	November 16, 1995	Kitt Peak	Spacewatch	·	2.4 km	MPC · JPL
322622	1995 XD_{5}	—	December 14, 1995	Kitt Peak	Spacewatch	·	1.3 km	MPC · JPL
322623	1996 EL_{8}	—	March 12, 1996	Kitt Peak	Spacewatch	·	2.1 km	MPC · JPL
322624	1996 TX_{17}	—	October 4, 1996	Kitt Peak	Spacewatch	·	2.3 km	MPC · JPL
322625	1996 TX_{45}	—	October 7, 1996	Kitt Peak	Spacewatch	·	2.0 km	MPC · JPL
322626	1996 TO_{46}	—	October 10, 1996	Kitt Peak	Spacewatch	·	1.7 km	MPC · JPL
322627	1997 HV	—	April 28, 1997	Kitt Peak	Spacewatch	MAS	720 m	MPC · JPL
322628	1997 LY_{5}	—	June 1, 1997	Kitt Peak	Spacewatch	·	1.5 km	MPC · JPL
322629	1997 TQ_{17}	—	October 8, 1997	Kitt Peak	Spacewatch	·	1.0 km	MPC · JPL
322630	1998 HX_{25}	—	April 20, 1998	Kitt Peak	Spacewatch	·	2.0 km	MPC · JPL
322631	1998 QA_{103}	—	August 26, 1998	La Silla	E. W. Elst	·	3.1 km	MPC · JPL
322632	1998 RC_{21}	—	September 14, 1998	Kitt Peak	Spacewatch	·	3.7 km	MPC · JPL
322633	1998 RN_{47}	—	September 14, 1998	Socorro	LINEAR	·	6.2 km	MPC · JPL
322634	1998 SU_{28}	—	September 18, 1998	Kitt Peak	Spacewatch	·	3.3 km	MPC · JPL
322635	1998 ST_{30}	—	September 19, 1998	Kitt Peak	Spacewatch	·	1.8 km	MPC · JPL
322636	1998 SZ_{50}	—	September 26, 1998	Kitt Peak	Spacewatch	EOS	2.2 km	MPC · JPL
322637	1998 SF_{80}	—	September 26, 1998	Socorro	LINEAR	·	1.8 km	MPC · JPL
322638	1998 SG_{97}	—	September 26, 1998	Socorro	LINEAR	·	3.5 km	MPC · JPL
322639	1998 SW_{101}	—	September 26, 1998	Socorro	LINEAR	TIR	3.7 km	MPC · JPL
322640	1998 SV_{155}	—	September 26, 1998	Socorro	LINEAR	·	2.0 km	MPC · JPL
322641	1998 SW_{176}	—	September 19, 1998	Apache Point	SDSS	·	2.1 km	MPC · JPL
322642	1998 TO_{4}	—	October 13, 1998	Kitt Peak	Spacewatch	·	3.6 km	MPC · JPL
322643	1998 TS_{20}	—	October 13, 1998	Kitt Peak	Spacewatch	·	910 m	MPC · JPL
322644	1998 UV_{3}	—	October 20, 1998	Caussols	ODAS	·	1.6 km	MPC · JPL
322645	1998 VM_{41}	—	November 14, 1998	Kitt Peak	Spacewatch	·	1.5 km	MPC · JPL
322646	1998 WV_{29}	—	November 24, 1998	Kitt Peak	Spacewatch	·	1.2 km	MPC · JPL
322647	1999 CU_{6}	—	February 10, 1999	Socorro	LINEAR	·	2.6 km	MPC · JPL
322648	1999 CR_{138}	—	February 7, 1999	Kitt Peak	Spacewatch	EUN	1.6 km	MPC · JPL
322649	1999 EO_{8}	—	March 14, 1999	Kitt Peak	Spacewatch	MAR	1.2 km	MPC · JPL
322650	1999 GV_{56}	—	April 9, 1999	Kitt Peak	Spacewatch	·	740 m	MPC · JPL
322651	1999 JP_{5}	—	May 10, 1999	Socorro	LINEAR	·	960 m	MPC · JPL
322652	1999 JO_{8}	—	May 13, 1999	Socorro	LINEAR	AMO +1km	1.6 km	MPC · JPL
322653	1999 JP_{96}	—	May 12, 1999	Socorro	LINEAR	·	1.1 km	MPC · JPL
322654	1999 LS_{14}	—	June 10, 1999	Socorro	LINEAR	·	1.9 km	MPC · JPL
322655	1999 LC_{30}	—	June 7, 1999	Haute Provence	Haute Provence	·	2.2 km	MPC · JPL
322656	1999 LV_{35}	—	June 12, 1999	Socorro	LINEAR	JUN	1.5 km	MPC · JPL
322657	1999 PV_{5}	—	August 12, 1999	Kitt Peak	Spacewatch	·	1.2 km	MPC · JPL
322658	1999 RF_{31}	—	September 8, 1999	Socorro	LINEAR	PHO	1.6 km	MPC · JPL
322659	1999 RP_{67}	—	September 7, 1999	Socorro	LINEAR	·	1.5 km	MPC · JPL
322660	1999 RT_{161}	—	September 9, 1999	Socorro	LINEAR	·	1.0 km	MPC · JPL
322661	1999 RN_{170}	—	September 9, 1999	Socorro	LINEAR	NYS	750 m	MPC · JPL
322662	1999 RJ_{181}	—	September 14, 1999	Kitt Peak	Spacewatch	·	780 m	MPC · JPL
322663	1999 RU_{185}	—	September 9, 1999	Socorro	LINEAR	·	830 m	MPC · JPL
322664	1999 RM_{253}	—	September 8, 1999	Kitt Peak	Spacewatch	·	2.0 km	MPC · JPL
322665	1999 SD_{21}	—	September 30, 1999	Kitt Peak	Spacewatch	·	2.1 km	MPC · JPL
322666	1999 TS_{51}	—	October 4, 1999	Kitt Peak	Spacewatch	·	2.1 km	MPC · JPL
322667	1999 TC_{79}	—	October 11, 1999	Kitt Peak	Spacewatch	V	740 m	MPC · JPL
322668	1999 TP_{81}	—	October 12, 1999	Kitt Peak	Spacewatch	V	750 m	MPC · JPL
322669	1999 TD_{111}	—	October 4, 1999	Socorro	LINEAR	·	3.5 km	MPC · JPL
322670	1999 TV_{131}	—	October 6, 1999	Socorro	LINEAR	·	1.1 km	MPC · JPL
322671	1999 TX_{131}	—	October 6, 1999	Socorro	LINEAR	·	1.3 km	MPC · JPL
322672	1999 TE_{221}	—	October 2, 1999	Catalina	CSS	·	1.3 km	MPC · JPL
322673	1999 TT_{229}	—	October 6, 1999	Socorro	LINEAR	·	840 m	MPC · JPL
322674	1999 TS_{263}	—	October 15, 1999	Kitt Peak	Spacewatch	·	2.4 km	MPC · JPL
322675	1999 TP_{295}	—	October 1, 1999	Catalina	CSS	·	840 m	MPC · JPL
322676	1999 TN_{297}	—	October 2, 1999	Kitt Peak	Spacewatch	·	1.1 km	MPC · JPL
322677	1999 TC_{301}	—	October 3, 1999	Kitt Peak	Spacewatch	·	2.5 km	MPC · JPL
322678	1999 TB_{316}	—	October 10, 1999	Kitt Peak	Spacewatch	·	780 m	MPC · JPL
322679	1999 UC_{57}	—	October 29, 1999	Kitt Peak	Spacewatch	KOR	1.7 km	MPC · JPL
322680	1999 VF_{3}	—	November 1, 1999	Kitt Peak	Spacewatch	·	1.2 km	MPC · JPL
322681	1999 VE_{42}	—	November 4, 1999	Kitt Peak	Spacewatch	V	720 m	MPC · JPL
322682	1999 VY_{53}	—	November 4, 1999	Socorro	LINEAR	·	2.9 km	MPC · JPL
322683	1999 VX_{82}	—	October 8, 1999	Kitt Peak	Spacewatch	·	2.2 km	MPC · JPL
322684	1999 VP_{84}	—	November 6, 1999	Kitt Peak	Spacewatch	·	1.0 km	MPC · JPL
322685	1999 VC_{91}	—	November 5, 1999	Socorro	LINEAR	EOS	2.5 km	MPC · JPL
322686	1999 VV_{97}	—	November 9, 1999	Socorro	LINEAR	·	1.4 km	MPC · JPL
322687	1999 VQ_{104}	—	November 9, 1999	Socorro	LINEAR	TEL	2.1 km	MPC · JPL
322688	1999 VX_{111}	—	November 9, 1999	Socorro	LINEAR	·	5.2 km	MPC · JPL
322689	1999 VG_{150}	—	November 14, 1999	Socorro	LINEAR	·	1.2 km	MPC · JPL
322690	1999 VG_{165}	—	November 14, 1999	Socorro	LINEAR	EOS	2.7 km	MPC · JPL
322691	1999 VZ_{172}	—	November 15, 1999	Socorro	LINEAR	·	3.2 km	MPC · JPL
322692	1999 VS_{185}	—	November 15, 1999	Socorro	LINEAR	·	3.9 km	MPC · JPL
322693	1999 WR_{27}	—	November 29, 1999	Kitt Peak	Spacewatch	·	1.9 km	MPC · JPL
322694	1999 XA_{8}	—	December 4, 1999	Ondřejov	P. Pravec	·	3.7 km	MPC · JPL
322695	1999 XA_{139}	—	December 5, 1999	Kitt Peak	Spacewatch	EOS	4.8 km	MPC · JPL
322696	1999 XE_{148}	—	December 7, 1999	Kitt Peak	Spacewatch	·	3.2 km	MPC · JPL
322697	1999 XE_{149}	—	December 8, 1999	Kitt Peak	Spacewatch	EOS	2.6 km	MPC · JPL
322698	1999 YC_{11}	—	December 27, 1999	Kitt Peak	Spacewatch	·	3.6 km	MPC · JPL
322699	1999 YW_{15}	—	December 31, 1999	Kitt Peak	Spacewatch	·	3.0 km	MPC · JPL
322700	2000 AS_{210}	—	January 5, 2000	Kitt Peak	Spacewatch	THM	2.6 km	MPC · JPL

== 322701–322800 ==
back to top

Designation			Discovery			Properties		Ref
Permanent	Provisional	Named after	Date	Site	Discoverer(s)	Category	Diam.	Ref
322701	2000 AO_{231}	—	January 4, 2000	Socorro	LINEAR	·	4.3 km	MPC · JPL
322702	2000 BJ_{11}	—	January 13, 2000	Kitt Peak	Spacewatch	VER	3.3 km	MPC · JPL
322703	2000 CX_{41}	—	February 2, 2000	Socorro	LINEAR	·	4.1 km	MPC · JPL
322704	2000 CP_{109}	—	February 5, 2000	Kitt Peak	M. W. Buie	·	1.6 km	MPC · JPL
322705	2000 DK_{8}	—	February 26, 2000	Socorro	LINEAR	APO	480 m	MPC · JPL
322706	2000 DB_{97}	—	February 29, 2000	Socorro	LINEAR	T_{j} (2.98)	5.7 km	MPC · JPL
322707	2000 DT_{114}	—	February 28, 2000	Kitt Peak	Spacewatch	·	900 m	MPC · JPL
322708	2000 DH_{117}	—	February 25, 2000	Kitt Peak	Spacewatch	·	1.2 km	MPC · JPL
322709	2000 FB_{2}	—	March 25, 2000	Kitt Peak	Spacewatch	(5)	1.0 km	MPC · JPL
322710	2000 GN_{6}	—	April 4, 2000	Socorro	LINEAR	·	1.1 km	MPC · JPL
322711	2000 HQ_{20}	—	April 30, 2000	Prescott	P. G. Comba	EUN	1.8 km	MPC · JPL
322712	2000 KJ_{13}	—	May 28, 2000	Socorro	LINEAR	·	1.2 km	MPC · JPL
322713	2000 KD_{41}	—	May 26, 2000	Anderson Mesa	LONEOS	T_{j} (2.84) · CYB	2.9 km	MPC · JPL
322714	2000 KW_{42}	—	May 25, 2000	Kitt Peak	Spacewatch	·	1.9 km	MPC · JPL
322715	2000 LX_{23}	—	June 8, 2000	Socorro	LINEAR	·	2.3 km	MPC · JPL
322716	2000 PG_{9}	—	August 6, 2000	Siding Spring	R. H. McNaught	·	1.6 km	MPC · JPL
322717	2000 PT_{29}	—	August 1, 2000	Socorro	LINEAR	·	2.3 km	MPC · JPL
322718	2000 QW_{114}	—	August 24, 2000	Socorro	LINEAR	·	3.2 km	MPC · JPL
322719	2000 QT_{170}	—	August 8, 2000	Socorro	LINEAR	·	890 m	MPC · JPL
322720	2000 RP_{8}	—	September 1, 2000	Socorro	LINEAR	BAR	2.2 km	MPC · JPL
322721	2000 RR_{25}	—	September 1, 2000	Socorro	LINEAR	JUN	1.7 km	MPC · JPL
322722	2000 RL_{90}	—	September 3, 2000	Socorro	LINEAR	·	2.1 km	MPC · JPL
322723	2000 SW_{9}	—	September 23, 2000	Socorro	LINEAR	GAL	1.9 km	MPC · JPL
322724	2000 SG_{11}	—	September 23, 2000	Socorro	LINEAR	·	2.1 km	MPC · JPL
322725	2000 SM_{47}	—	September 23, 2000	Socorro	LINEAR	ADE	3.1 km	MPC · JPL
322726	2000 SY_{51}	—	September 23, 2000	Socorro	LINEAR	·	3.1 km	MPC · JPL
322727	2000 SS_{58}	—	September 24, 2000	Socorro	LINEAR	·	1.6 km	MPC · JPL
322728	2000 SE_{129}	—	September 26, 2000	Socorro	LINEAR	·	2.2 km	MPC · JPL
322729	2000 SA_{136}	—	September 23, 2000	Socorro	LINEAR	DOR	3.1 km	MPC · JPL
322730	2000 ST_{149}	—	September 24, 2000	Socorro	LINEAR	·	2.5 km	MPC · JPL
322731	2000 SK_{163}	—	September 30, 2000	Ondřejov	P. Kušnirák, P. Pravec	·	3.1 km	MPC · JPL
322732	2000 SY_{195}	—	September 24, 2000	Socorro	LINEAR	·	710 m	MPC · JPL
322733	2000 SD_{231}	—	September 30, 2000	Socorro	LINEAR	·	3.4 km	MPC · JPL
322734	2000 SM_{236}	—	September 24, 2000	Socorro	LINEAR	·	2.0 km	MPC · JPL
322735	2000 SM_{246}	—	September 24, 2000	Socorro	LINEAR	EUN	2.5 km	MPC · JPL
322736	2000 SW_{251}	—	September 24, 2000	Socorro	LINEAR	·	2.2 km	MPC · JPL
322737	2000 SU_{287}	—	September 26, 2000	Socorro	LINEAR	·	860 m	MPC · JPL
322738	2000 SZ_{296}	—	September 28, 2000	Socorro	LINEAR	·	910 m	MPC · JPL
322739	2000 SZ_{314}	—	September 28, 2000	Socorro	LINEAR	JUN	1.7 km	MPC · JPL
322740	2000 TM_{1}	—	October 3, 2000	Kitt Peak	Spacewatch	BAR	1.8 km	MPC · JPL
322741	2000 TK_{40}	—	October 1, 2000	Socorro	LINEAR	·	2.8 km	MPC · JPL
322742	2000 TJ_{45}	—	October 1, 2000	Socorro	LINEAR	·	970 m	MPC · JPL
322743	2000 UX_{64}	—	October 25, 2000	Socorro	LINEAR	·	980 m	MPC · JPL
322744	2000 VA_{42}	—	November 1, 2000	Socorro	LINEAR	·	1.2 km	MPC · JPL
322745	2000 WY_{19}	—	November 23, 2000	Kitt Peak	Spacewatch	·	650 m	MPC · JPL
322746	2000 WX_{76}	—	November 20, 2000	Socorro	LINEAR	·	2.9 km	MPC · JPL
322747	2000 WW_{155}	—	November 30, 2000	Socorro	LINEAR	·	2.9 km	MPC · JPL
322748	2000 YQ_{27}	—	December 30, 2000	Kitt Peak	Spacewatch	·	3.8 km	MPC · JPL
322749	2000 YO_{31}	—	December 31, 2000	Kitt Peak	Spacewatch	·	1.7 km	MPC · JPL
322750	2000 YF_{109}	—	December 30, 2000	Socorro	LINEAR	·	2.4 km	MPC · JPL
322751	2001 BM	—	January 17, 2001	Oizumi	T. Kobayashi	·	4.4 km	MPC · JPL
322752	2001 BN_{10}	—	January 18, 2001	Socorro	LINEAR	H	670 m	MPC · JPL
322753	2001 BL_{68}	—	January 31, 2001	Socorro	LINEAR	H	740 m	MPC · JPL
322754	2001 BU_{77}	—	January 4, 2001	Haleakala	NEAT	·	3.7 km	MPC · JPL
322755	2001 CT_{23}	—	February 1, 2001	Anderson Mesa	LONEOS	·	3.7 km	MPC · JPL
322756	2001 CK_{32}	—	February 13, 2001	Socorro	LINEAR	ATE	510 m	MPC · JPL
322757	2001 DF_{17}	—	February 16, 2001	Socorro	LINEAR	·	1.3 km	MPC · JPL
322758	2001 DV_{23}	—	February 2, 2001	Socorro	LINEAR	·	4.9 km	MPC · JPL
322759	2001 DW_{106}	—	January 26, 2001	Kitt Peak	Spacewatch	·	3.4 km	MPC · JPL
322760	2001 EZ_{3}	—	March 2, 2001	Anderson Mesa	LONEOS	·	3.1 km	MPC · JPL
322761	2001 EW_{16}	—	March 3, 2001	Socorro	LINEAR	H	710 m	MPC · JPL
322762	2001 FM	—	March 16, 2001	Socorro	LINEAR	·	2.4 km	MPC · JPL
322763	2001 FA_{7}	—	March 18, 2001	Socorro	LINEAR	APO +1km	1.3 km	MPC · JPL
322764	2001 FE_{20}	—	March 19, 2001	Anderson Mesa	LONEOS	·	3.8 km	MPC · JPL
322765	2001 FY_{44}	—	March 18, 2001	Socorro	LINEAR	·	4.5 km	MPC · JPL
322766	2001 FN_{62}	—	March 19, 2001	Socorro	LINEAR	·	1.3 km	MPC · JPL
322767	2001 FJ_{114}	—	March 19, 2001	Anderson Mesa	LONEOS	·	3.5 km	MPC · JPL
322768	2001 FO_{122}	—	March 23, 2001	Anderson Mesa	LONEOS	·	2.8 km	MPC · JPL
322769	2001 FE_{140}	—	March 21, 2001	Haleakala	NEAT	NYS	1.4 km	MPC · JPL
322770	2001 FD_{145}	—	March 23, 2001	Haleakala	NEAT	·	6.2 km	MPC · JPL
322771	2001 FY_{157}	—	March 27, 2001	Anderson Mesa	LONEOS	·	3.9 km	MPC · JPL
322772	2001 FA_{172}	—	March 24, 2001	Haleakala	NEAT	H	800 m	MPC · JPL
322773	2001 FX_{179}	—	March 20, 2001	Anderson Mesa	LONEOS	PHO	1.2 km	MPC · JPL
322774	2001 FL_{191}	—	March 20, 2001	Kitt Peak	Spacewatch	·	1.1 km	MPC · JPL
322775	2001 HA_{8}	—	April 21, 2001	Socorro	LINEAR	AMO +1km	1.6 km	MPC · JPL
322776	2001 JQ_{1}	—	May 14, 2001	Kitt Peak	Spacewatch	·	3.6 km	MPC · JPL
322777	2001 KL_{43}	—	May 22, 2001	Socorro	LINEAR	TIR	4.6 km	MPC · JPL
322778	2001 KR_{51}	—	May 16, 2001	Socorro	LINEAR	H	980 m	MPC · JPL
322779	2001 ML_{28}	—	June 25, 2001	Palomar	NEAT	EUN	2.0 km	MPC · JPL
322780	2001 OX_{4}	—	July 17, 2001	Anderson Mesa	LONEOS	·	2.1 km	MPC · JPL
322781	2001 OD_{17}	—	July 21, 2001	Ondřejov	P. Pravec, L. Kotková	·	1.6 km	MPC · JPL
322782	2001 ON_{94}	—	July 27, 2001	Anderson Mesa	LONEOS	·	2.0 km	MPC · JPL
322783	2001 PX_{48}	—	August 14, 2001	Palomar	NEAT	·	1.7 km	MPC · JPL
322784	2001 QW_{1}	—	August 16, 2001	Socorro	LINEAR	·	2.6 km	MPC · JPL
322785	2001 QW_{7}	—	August 16, 2001	Socorro	LINEAR	·	1.6 km	MPC · JPL
322786	2001 QY_{47}	—	August 15, 2001	Haleakala	NEAT	·	1.9 km	MPC · JPL
322787	2001 QP_{54}	—	August 16, 2001	Socorro	LINEAR	·	2.0 km	MPC · JPL
322788	2001 QX_{63}	—	August 16, 2001	Socorro	LINEAR	·	1.2 km	MPC · JPL
322789	2001 QK_{85}	—	August 19, 2001	Socorro	LINEAR	·	2.0 km	MPC · JPL
322790	2001 QO_{86}	—	August 16, 2001	Palomar	NEAT	·	2.2 km	MPC · JPL
322791	2001 QR_{130}	—	August 20, 2001	Socorro	LINEAR	·	1.8 km	MPC · JPL
322792	2001 QH_{136}	—	August 22, 2001	Socorro	LINEAR	·	1.9 km	MPC · JPL
322793	2001 QL_{141}	—	August 24, 2001	Socorro	LINEAR	·	2.0 km	MPC · JPL
322794	2001 QE_{207}	—	August 23, 2001	Anderson Mesa	LONEOS	KRM	2.5 km	MPC · JPL
322795	2001 QZ_{234}	—	August 24, 2001	Socorro	LINEAR	·	2.4 km	MPC · JPL
322796	2001 QR_{237}	—	August 24, 2001	Socorro	LINEAR	·	1.8 km	MPC · JPL
322797	2001 QS_{242}	—	August 24, 2001	Socorro	LINEAR	JUN	1.6 km	MPC · JPL
322798	2001 QH_{254}	—	August 25, 2001	Socorro	LINEAR	MAR	1.2 km	MPC · JPL
322799	2001 QE_{278}	—	August 19, 2001	Socorro	LINEAR	EUN	1.8 km	MPC · JPL
322800	2001 RL_{13}	—	September 10, 2001	Socorro	LINEAR	·	1.9 km	MPC · JPL

== 322801–322900 ==
back to top

Designation			Discovery			Properties		Ref
Permanent	Provisional	Named after	Date	Site	Discoverer(s)	Category	Diam.	Ref
322801	2001 RS_{13}	—	September 10, 2001	Socorro	LINEAR	·	1.9 km	MPC · JPL
322802	2001 RS_{49}	—	September 10, 2001	Socorro	LINEAR	·	2.5 km	MPC · JPL
322803	2001 RO_{50}	—	September 10, 2001	Socorro	LINEAR	·	1.7 km	MPC · JPL
322804	2001 RA_{69}	—	September 10, 2001	Socorro	LINEAR	·	1.6 km	MPC · JPL
322805	2001 RR_{87}	—	September 11, 2001	Anderson Mesa	LONEOS	·	2.7 km	MPC · JPL
322806	2001 RE_{113}	—	September 12, 2001	Socorro	LINEAR	·	1.2 km	MPC · JPL
322807	2001 RX_{123}	—	September 12, 2001	Socorro	LINEAR	HNS	1.4 km	MPC · JPL
322808	2001 RW_{136}	—	September 12, 2001	Socorro	LINEAR	·	1.8 km	MPC · JPL
322809	2001 RU_{149}	—	September 11, 2001	Anderson Mesa	LONEOS	MAR	1.1 km	MPC · JPL
322810	2001 SX_{24}	—	September 16, 2001	Socorro	LINEAR	·	1.3 km	MPC · JPL
322811	2001 SL_{26}	—	September 16, 2001	Socorro	LINEAR	·	1.6 km	MPC · JPL
322812	2001 SW_{43}	—	September 16, 2001	Socorro	LINEAR	·	1.8 km	MPC · JPL
322813	2001 SG_{55}	—	September 16, 2001	Socorro	LINEAR	·	2.5 km	MPC · JPL
322814	2001 SD_{62}	—	September 17, 2001	Socorro	LINEAR	·	2.2 km	MPC · JPL
322815	2001 SM_{66}	—	September 17, 2001	Socorro	LINEAR	·	2.2 km	MPC · JPL
322816	2001 SM_{84}	—	September 20, 2001	Socorro	LINEAR	HNS	1.3 km	MPC · JPL
322817	2001 SS_{89}	—	September 20, 2001	Socorro	LINEAR	·	1.7 km	MPC · JPL
322818	2001 SF_{95}	—	September 20, 2001	Socorro	LINEAR	EUN	1.4 km	MPC · JPL
322819	2001 SQ_{134}	—	September 16, 2001	Socorro	LINEAR	(5)	1.2 km	MPC · JPL
322820	2001 SJ_{162}	—	September 17, 2001	Socorro	LINEAR	·	1.8 km	MPC · JPL
322821	2001 SY_{200}	—	September 19, 2001	Socorro	LINEAR	·	1.8 km	MPC · JPL
322822	2001 SK_{215}	—	September 19, 2001	Socorro	LINEAR	(5)	1.7 km	MPC · JPL
322823	2001 SQ_{222}	—	September 19, 2001	Socorro	LINEAR	·	1.9 km	MPC · JPL
322824	2001 SN_{225}	—	September 19, 2001	Socorro	LINEAR	·	3.2 km	MPC · JPL
322825	2001 SN_{241}	—	September 19, 2001	Socorro	LINEAR	HNS	1.5 km	MPC · JPL
322826	2001 ST_{255}	—	September 19, 2001	Socorro	LINEAR	JUN	1.5 km	MPC · JPL
322827	2001 SK_{269}	—	September 19, 2001	Kitt Peak	Spacewatch	MIS	2.4 km	MPC · JPL
322828	2001 SD_{294}	—	September 20, 2001	Socorro	LINEAR	·	1.5 km	MPC · JPL
322829	2001 SO_{317}	—	September 19, 2001	Socorro	LINEAR	·	2.3 km	MPC · JPL
322830	2001 SF_{334}	—	September 19, 2001	Kitt Peak	Spacewatch	·	2.0 km	MPC · JPL
322831	2001 SE_{341}	—	September 21, 2001	Palomar	NEAT	MAR	1.4 km	MPC · JPL
322832	2001 TU_{11}	—	September 21, 2001	Socorro	LINEAR	EUN	1.3 km	MPC · JPL
322833	2001 TV_{19}	—	October 9, 2001	Socorro	LINEAR	·	2.0 km	MPC · JPL
322834	2001 TG_{48}	—	October 9, 2001	Kitt Peak	Spacewatch	·	670 m	MPC · JPL
322835	2001 TZ_{53}	—	October 13, 2001	Socorro	LINEAR	(1547)	2.2 km	MPC · JPL
322836	2001 TN_{63}	—	October 13, 2001	Socorro	LINEAR	·	2.3 km	MPC · JPL
322837	2001 TV_{68}	—	October 13, 2001	Socorro	LINEAR	·	1.5 km	MPC · JPL
322838	2001 TY_{81}	—	October 14, 2001	Socorro	LINEAR	·	1.7 km	MPC · JPL
322839	2001 TX_{86}	—	October 14, 2001	Socorro	LINEAR	·	1.8 km	MPC · JPL
322840	2001 TF_{93}	—	October 14, 2001	Socorro	LINEAR	EUN	1.6 km	MPC · JPL
322841	2001 TW_{95}	—	October 14, 2001	Socorro	LINEAR	·	2.6 km	MPC · JPL
322842	2001 TQ_{97}	—	October 14, 2001	Socorro	LINEAR	·	2.0 km	MPC · JPL
322843	2001 TE_{113}	—	October 14, 2001	Socorro	LINEAR	HNS	1.4 km	MPC · JPL
322844	2001 TJ_{124}	—	October 12, 2001	Haleakala	NEAT	EUN	1.4 km	MPC · JPL
322845	2001 TR_{179}	—	October 14, 2001	Socorro	LINEAR	AEO	1.2 km	MPC · JPL
322846	2001 TC_{187}	—	October 14, 2001	Socorro	LINEAR	EUN	1.2 km	MPC · JPL
322847	2001 TU_{187}	—	October 14, 2001	Socorro	LINEAR	·	2.4 km	MPC · JPL
322848	2001 TC_{190}	—	October 14, 2001	Socorro	LINEAR	·	2.4 km	MPC · JPL
322849	2001 TZ_{230}	—	October 15, 2001	Palomar	NEAT	·	1.9 km	MPC · JPL
322850	2001 TM_{248}	—	October 14, 2001	Apache Point	SDSS	·	1.2 km	MPC · JPL
322851	2001 TO_{258}	—	October 15, 2001	Palomar	NEAT	·	1.7 km	MPC · JPL
322852	2001 UU_{31}	—	October 16, 2001	Socorro	LINEAR	·	2.5 km	MPC · JPL
322853	2001 UG_{41}	—	October 17, 2001	Socorro	LINEAR	·	2.3 km	MPC · JPL
322854	2001 UT_{42}	—	October 17, 2001	Socorro	LINEAR	EUN	1.0 km	MPC · JPL
322855	2001 UL_{54}	—	October 18, 2001	Socorro	LINEAR	EUN	1.3 km	MPC · JPL
322856	2001 UZ_{78}	—	October 20, 2001	Socorro	LINEAR	·	1.8 km	MPC · JPL
322857	2001 UQ_{82}	—	October 20, 2001	Socorro	LINEAR	·	2.5 km	MPC · JPL
322858	2001 UD_{90}	—	October 21, 2001	Kitt Peak	Spacewatch	·	1.3 km	MPC · JPL
322859	2001 UN_{97}	—	October 17, 2001	Socorro	LINEAR	·	2.1 km	MPC · JPL
322860	2001 UG_{105}	—	October 20, 2001	Socorro	LINEAR	·	2.4 km	MPC · JPL
322861	2001 UH_{105}	—	October 20, 2001	Socorro	LINEAR	MAR	1.1 km	MPC · JPL
322862	2001 UW_{125}	—	October 23, 2001	Palomar	NEAT	HNS	1.6 km	MPC · JPL
322863	2001 UQ_{130}	—	October 20, 2001	Socorro	LINEAR	EUN	1.3 km	MPC · JPL
322864	2001 UU_{136}	—	October 23, 2001	Socorro	LINEAR	·	1.9 km	MPC · JPL
322865	2001 UW_{142}	—	October 23, 2001	Socorro	LINEAR	·	1.6 km	MPC · JPL
322866	2001 UN_{155}	—	October 23, 2001	Socorro	LINEAR	·	2.5 km	MPC · JPL
322867	2001 UM_{157}	—	October 23, 2001	Socorro	LINEAR	·	2.1 km	MPC · JPL
322868	2001 UP_{171}	—	October 24, 2001	Socorro	LINEAR	·	2.0 km	MPC · JPL
322869	2001 UV_{192}	—	October 18, 2001	Socorro	LINEAR	(1547)	1.9 km	MPC · JPL
322870	2001 UV_{200}	—	October 19, 2001	Palomar	NEAT	·	1.4 km	MPC · JPL
322871	2001 UL_{215}	—	October 23, 2001	Socorro	LINEAR	·	1.7 km	MPC · JPL
322872	2001 UA_{217}	—	October 24, 2001	Socorro	LINEAR	·	1.5 km	MPC · JPL
322873	2001 VX_{52}	—	November 10, 2001	Socorro	LINEAR	MAR	1.7 km	MPC · JPL
322874	2001 VB_{73}	—	November 12, 2001	Kitt Peak	Spacewatch	·	1.6 km	MPC · JPL
322875	2001 VO_{103}	—	November 12, 2001	Socorro	LINEAR	·	2.9 km	MPC · JPL
322876	2001 VD_{133}	—	November 11, 2001	Apache Point	SDSS	WIT	1.1 km	MPC · JPL
322877	2001 WU_{19}	—	November 17, 2001	Socorro	LINEAR	·	1.7 km	MPC · JPL
322878	2001 WR_{29}	—	November 17, 2001	Socorro	LINEAR	·	3.2 km	MPC · JPL
322879	2001 WG_{42}	—	November 18, 2001	Socorro	LINEAR	·	2.1 km	MPC · JPL
322880	2001 WS_{65}	—	November 20, 2001	Socorro	LINEAR	·	2.4 km	MPC · JPL
322881	2001 WT_{99}	—	November 20, 2001	Socorro	LINEAR	·	2.3 km	MPC · JPL
322882	2001 WQ_{103}	—	November 18, 2001	Socorro	LINEAR	·	2.8 km	MPC · JPL
322883	2001 XA_{17}	—	December 9, 2001	Socorro	LINEAR	·	3.4 km	MPC · JPL
322884	2001 XG_{36}	—	December 13, 2001	Palomar	NEAT	·	2.6 km	MPC · JPL
322885	2001 XO_{37}	—	December 9, 2001	Socorro	LINEAR	·	2.4 km	MPC · JPL
322886	2001 XK_{45}	—	December 9, 2001	Socorro	LINEAR	·	3.4 km	MPC · JPL
322887	2001 XY_{70}	—	December 11, 2001	Socorro	LINEAR	·	3.6 km	MPC · JPL
322888	2001 XK_{95}	—	November 12, 2001	Socorro	LINEAR	·	2.9 km	MPC · JPL
322889	2001 XY_{109}	—	December 11, 2001	Socorro	LINEAR	EUN	1.2 km	MPC · JPL
322890	2001 XL_{125}	—	December 14, 2001	Socorro	LINEAR	DOR	2.2 km	MPC · JPL
322891	2001 XT_{127}	—	December 14, 2001	Socorro	LINEAR	DOR	2.3 km	MPC · JPL
322892	2001 XH_{146}	—	December 14, 2001	Socorro	LINEAR	·	2.8 km	MPC · JPL
322893	2001 XJ_{150}	—	December 14, 2001	Socorro	LINEAR	·	2.7 km	MPC · JPL
322894	2001 XP_{178}	—	December 9, 2001	Kitt Peak	Spacewatch	·	3.0 km	MPC · JPL
322895	2001 XC_{212}	—	December 11, 2001	Socorro	LINEAR	·	2.9 km	MPC · JPL
322896	2001 XS_{239}	—	December 15, 2001	Socorro	LINEAR	·	2.3 km	MPC · JPL
322897	2001 YH_{3}	—	December 16, 2001	Pla D'Arguines	D'Arguines, Pla	·	1.7 km	MPC · JPL
322898	2001 YT_{9}	—	December 17, 2001	Socorro	LINEAR	GEF	1.6 km	MPC · JPL
322899	2001 YT_{57}	—	December 18, 2001	Socorro	LINEAR	DOR	3.2 km	MPC · JPL
322900	2001 YE_{117}	—	December 18, 2001	Socorro	LINEAR	H	670 m	MPC · JPL

== 322901–323000 ==
back to top

Designation			Discovery			Properties		Ref
Permanent	Provisional	Named after	Date	Site	Discoverer(s)	Category	Diam.	Ref
322901	2001 YU_{122}	—	December 14, 2001	Needville	Needville	·	2.4 km	MPC · JPL
322902	2001 YN_{147}	—	December 18, 2001	Socorro	LINEAR	·	1.8 km	MPC · JPL
322903	2001 YU_{161}	—	December 25, 2001	Kitt Peak	Spacewatch	·	2.7 km	MPC · JPL
322904	2002 AZ_{3}	—	January 5, 2002	Socorro	LINEAR	(14916)	3.2 km	MPC · JPL
322905	2002 AK_{8}	—	January 6, 2002	Kitt Peak	Spacewatch	AGN	1.4 km	MPC · JPL
322906	2002 AL_{15}	—	January 6, 2002	Socorro	LINEAR	·	2.9 km	MPC · JPL
322907	2002 AS_{38}	—	January 9, 2002	Socorro	LINEAR	DOR	2.4 km	MPC · JPL
322908	2002 AQ_{44}	—	January 9, 2002	Socorro	LINEAR	·	2.3 km	MPC · JPL
322909	2002 AK_{99}	—	January 8, 2002	Socorro	LINEAR	·	2.0 km	MPC · JPL
322910	2002 AF_{147}	—	December 14, 2001	Kitt Peak	Spacewatch	·	2.0 km	MPC · JPL
322911	2002 AF_{165}	—	January 13, 2002	Kitt Peak	Spacewatch	·	1 km	MPC · JPL
322912 Jedlik	2002 AS_{204}	Jedlik	January 11, 2002	Piszkéstető	K. Sárneczky, Z. Heiner	·	670 m	MPC · JPL
322913	2002 CM_{1}	—	February 3, 2002	Haleakala	NEAT	AMO +1km	1.5 km	MPC · JPL
322914	2002 CP_{135}	—	February 6, 2002	Anderson Mesa	LONEOS	·	850 m	MPC · JPL
322915	2002 CK_{152}	—	February 10, 2002	Socorro	LINEAR	·	860 m	MPC · JPL
322916	2002 CU_{153}	—	February 8, 2002	Kitt Peak	Spacewatch	AST	1.6 km	MPC · JPL
322917	2002 CH_{154}	—	February 10, 2002	Kitt Peak	Spacewatch	·	3.3 km	MPC · JPL
322918	2002 CX_{180}	—	February 10, 2002	Socorro	LINEAR	AGN	1.5 km	MPC · JPL
322919	2002 CX_{206}	—	February 10, 2002	Socorro	LINEAR	·	3.0 km	MPC · JPL
322920	2002 CM_{211}	—	January 6, 2002	Kitt Peak	Spacewatch	·	2.7 km	MPC · JPL
322921	2002 CR_{217}	—	February 10, 2002	Socorro	LINEAR	·	860 m	MPC · JPL
322922	2002 CK_{234}	—	February 8, 2002	Kitt Peak	Spacewatch	·	1.1 km	MPC · JPL
322923	2002 CB_{273}	—	February 8, 2002	Palomar	NEAT	BRA	2.1 km	MPC · JPL
322924	2002 CP_{294}	—	February 10, 2002	Socorro	LINEAR	·	2.7 km	MPC · JPL
322925	2002 DL	—	February 16, 2002	Bohyunsan	Jeon, Y.-B., Lee, B.-C.	·	2.3 km	MPC · JPL
322926	2002 DS_{16}	—	February 20, 2002	Kitt Peak	Spacewatch	·	2.8 km	MPC · JPL
322927	2002 DH_{19}	—	February 16, 2002	Palomar	NEAT	GEF	1.4 km	MPC · JPL
322928	2002 ET_{6}	—	March 6, 2002	Siding Spring	R. H. McNaught	·	2.3 km	MPC · JPL
322929	2002 EG_{47}	—	March 12, 2002	Palomar	NEAT	·	1.6 km	MPC · JPL
322930	2002 ES_{87}	—	March 9, 2002	Socorro	LINEAR	·	990 m	MPC · JPL
322931	2002 EP_{93}	—	March 14, 2002	Socorro	LINEAR	·	2.2 km	MPC · JPL
322932	2002 EB_{124}	—	March 12, 2002	Kitt Peak	Spacewatch	·	2.6 km	MPC · JPL
322933	2002 EJ_{126}	—	March 12, 2002	Socorro	LINEAR	·	790 m	MPC · JPL
322934	2002 EC_{127}	—	March 12, 2002	Palomar	NEAT	BRA	1.8 km	MPC · JPL
322935	2002 ER_{134}	—	March 13, 2002	Palomar	NEAT	·	900 m	MPC · JPL
322936	2002 EW_{160}	—	March 5, 2002	Kitt Peak	Spacewatch	·	910 m	MPC · JPL
322937	2002 GG	—	April 2, 2002	Palomar	NEAT	fast	910 m	MPC · JPL
322938	2002 GV_{8}	—	April 12, 2002	Haleakala	NEAT	·	2.3 km	MPC · JPL
322939	2002 GZ_{22}	—	April 15, 2002	Palomar	NEAT	·	3.1 km	MPC · JPL
322940	2002 GJ_{53}	—	April 5, 2002	Anderson Mesa	LONEOS	·	2.4 km	MPC · JPL
322941	2002 GE_{73}	—	April 9, 2002	Anderson Mesa	LONEOS	·	850 m	MPC · JPL
322942	2002 GR_{75}	—	April 9, 2002	Socorro	LINEAR	·	1.6 km	MPC · JPL
322943	2002 GA_{105}	—	April 10, 2002	Terskol	Terskol	·	3.4 km	MPC · JPL
322944	2002 GJ_{114}	—	April 11, 2002	Socorro	LINEAR	·	990 m	MPC · JPL
322945	2002 GF_{137}	—	April 12, 2002	Socorro	LINEAR	·	1.7 km	MPC · JPL
322946	2002 GB_{141}	—	April 13, 2002	Kitt Peak	Spacewatch	·	680 m	MPC · JPL
322947	2002 GB_{148}	—	April 13, 2002	Palomar	NEAT	H	570 m	MPC · JPL
322948	2002 GE_{164}	—	April 14, 2002	Palomar	NEAT	·	3.1 km	MPC · JPL
322949	2002 GF_{170}	—	April 9, 2002	Socorro	LINEAR	·	2.1 km	MPC · JPL
322950	2002 GP_{184}	—	April 8, 2002	Kitt Peak	Spacewatch	·	700 m	MPC · JPL
322951	2002 GT_{190}	—	October 22, 2003	Apache Point	SDSS	·	980 m	MPC · JPL
322952	2002 HE_{18}	—	April 18, 2002	Haleakala	NEAT	·	1.0 km	MPC · JPL
322953	2002 HP_{18}	—	March 15, 2007	Kitt Peak	Spacewatch	·	2.6 km	MPC · JPL
322954	2002 JV_{10}	—	May 7, 2002	Socorro	LINEAR	H	690 m	MPC · JPL
322955	2002 JT_{50}	—	May 9, 2002	Socorro	LINEAR	·	1.1 km	MPC · JPL
322956	2002 JT_{75}	—	May 10, 2002	Socorro	LINEAR	·	1.2 km	MPC · JPL
322957	2002 JB_{88}	—	May 8, 2002	Anderson Mesa	LONEOS	·	850 m	MPC · JPL
322958	2002 JA_{89}	—	May 11, 2002	Socorro	LINEAR	·	850 m	MPC · JPL
322959	2002 JL_{92}	—	May 11, 2002	Socorro	LINEAR	·	2.5 km	MPC · JPL
322960	2002 JF_{117}	—	May 4, 2002	Palomar	NEAT	EOS	4.3 km	MPC · JPL
322961	2002 JY_{119}	—	May 5, 2002	Anderson Mesa	LONEOS	·	4.8 km	MPC · JPL
322962	2002 JL_{126}	—	May 7, 2002	Kitt Peak	Spacewatch	·	3.8 km	MPC · JPL
322963	2002 JE_{128}	—	May 7, 2002	Palomar	NEAT	·	1.1 km	MPC · JPL
322964	2002 JF_{140}	—	May 10, 2002	Anderson Mesa	LONEOS	·	980 m	MPC · JPL
322965	2002 JR_{150}	—	February 14, 2005	Kitt Peak	Spacewatch	·	870 m	MPC · JPL
322966	2002 KF_{4}	—	May 22, 2002	Socorro	LINEAR	T_{j} (2.77) · AMO +1km	1.4 km	MPC · JPL
322967	2002 KJ_{14}	—	May 30, 2002	Palomar	NEAT	·	1.3 km	MPC · JPL
322968	2002 KT_{15}	—	May 18, 2002	Palomar	NEAT	·	620 m	MPC · JPL
322969	2002 KE_{16}	—	May 23, 2002	Palomar	NEAT	·	4.3 km	MPC · JPL
322970	2002 LA_{10}	—	June 5, 2002	Socorro	LINEAR	·	1.2 km	MPC · JPL
322971	2002 LO_{20}	—	June 6, 2002	Socorro	LINEAR	·	1.1 km	MPC · JPL
322972	2002 LS_{22}	—	June 8, 2002	Socorro	LINEAR	EUP	6.2 km	MPC · JPL
322973	2002 LP_{57}	—	June 11, 2002	Anderson Mesa	LONEOS	·	1.1 km	MPC · JPL
322974	2002 LR_{60}	—	June 12, 2002	Palomar	NEAT	·	900 m	MPC · JPL
322975	2002 LR_{63}	—	June 13, 2002	Palomar	NEAT	·	3.6 km	MPC · JPL
322976	2002 MJ_{3}	—	June 16, 2002	Palomar	NEAT	H	650 m	MPC · JPL
322977	2002 MY_{4}	—	June 23, 2002	Palomar	NEAT	·	930 m	MPC · JPL
322978	2002 MP_{6}	—	March 22, 2001	Kitt Peak	Spacewatch	·	3.8 km	MPC · JPL
322979	2002 NU_{3}	—	July 9, 2002	Palomar	NEAT	·	1.7 km	MPC · JPL
322980	2002 NJ_{19}	—	July 9, 2002	Socorro	LINEAR	·	790 m	MPC · JPL
322981	2002 NO_{45}	—	July 13, 2002	Palomar	NEAT	·	7.3 km	MPC · JPL
322982	2002 NJ_{52}	—	July 14, 2002	Palomar	NEAT	·	1.0 km	MPC · JPL
322983	2002 NP_{59}	—	July 4, 2002	Palomar	NEAT	·	3.7 km	MPC · JPL
322984	2002 NR_{69}	—	July 14, 2002	Palomar	NEAT	HYG	3.6 km	MPC · JPL
322985	2002 NS_{70}	—	July 9, 2002	Palomar	NEAT	H	630 m	MPC · JPL
322986	2002 NN_{72}	—	July 15, 2002	Palomar	NEAT	V	650 m	MPC · JPL
322987	2002 NJ_{75}	—	September 28, 2006	Catalina	CSS	V	730 m	MPC · JPL
322988	2002 NA_{76}	—	June 17, 2007	Kitt Peak	Spacewatch	·	2.5 km	MPC · JPL
322989	2002 OR_{6}	—	July 20, 2002	Palomar	NEAT	·	3.5 km	MPC · JPL
322990	2002 OO_{10}	—	July 22, 2002	Palomar	NEAT	NYS	1.4 km	MPC · JPL
322991	2002 OU_{11}	—	July 18, 2002	Socorro	LINEAR	·	4.2 km	MPC · JPL
322992	2002 OR_{12}	—	July 17, 2002	Socorro	LINEAR	·	2.1 km	MPC · JPL
322993	2002 OB_{18}	—	July 18, 2002	Socorro	LINEAR	H	710 m	MPC · JPL
322994	2002 OJ_{22}	—	July 30, 2002	Lake Tekapo	Lake Tekapo	H	630 m	MPC · JPL
322995	2002 OC_{29}	—	July 21, 2002	Palomar	NEAT	·	2.8 km	MPC · JPL
322996	2002 OT_{30}	—	July 20, 2002	Palomar	NEAT	·	3.8 km	MPC · JPL
322997	2002 OQ_{32}	—	July 22, 2002	Palomar	NEAT	(2076)	860 m	MPC · JPL
322998	2002 OC_{35}	—	September 27, 2006	Kitt Peak	Spacewatch	·	1.1 km	MPC · JPL
322999	2002 OK_{36}	—	July 29, 2002	Palomar	NEAT	·	3.8 km	MPC · JPL
323000	2002 PL_{36}	—	August 6, 2002	Palomar	NEAT	NYS	1.3 km	MPC · JPL

back to top

== See also ==
- Meanings of minor-planet names: 322001–323000
