= Meanings of minor-planet names: 321001–322000 =

As minor planet discoveries are confirmed, they are given a permanent number by the IAU's Minor Planet Center (MPC), and the discoverers can then submit names for them, following the IAU's naming conventions. The list below concerns those minor planets in the specified number-range that have received names, and explains the meanings of those names.

Official naming citations of newly named small Solar System bodies are approved and published in a bulletin by IAU's Working Group for Small Bodies Nomenclature (WGSBN). Before May 2021, citations were published in MPC's Minor Planet Circulars for many decades. Recent citations can also be found on the JPL Small-Body Database (SBDB). Until his death in 2016, German astronomer Lutz D. Schmadel compiled these citations into the Dictionary of Minor Planet Names (DMP) and regularly updated the collection.

Based on Paul Herget's The Names of the Minor Planets, Schmadel also researched the unclear origin of numerous asteroids, most of which had been named prior to World War II. This article incorporates text from this source, which is in the public domain: SBDB New namings may only be added to this list below after official publication as the preannouncement of names is condemned. The WGSBN publishes a comprehensive guideline for the naming rules of non-cometary small Solar System bodies.

== 321001–321100 ==
Named minor planet	Provisional	This minor planet was named for...	Ref · Catalog
321024 Gijon	2008 MD_{1}	Gijón (Asturian: Xixón in Asturian) is the largest city and municipality in the autonomous community of Asturias in Spain	JPL · 321024
321045 Kretinga	2008 QY_{32}	Kretinga is a town in the northwest region of Lithuania with 21 000 inhabitants. First mentioned in 1253, the town is located 12 km east of the popular Baltic Sea resort town of Palanga, and about 25 km north of Lithuania's principal seaport, Klaipėda.	IAU · 321045
321046 Klushantsev	2008 QL_{33}	Pavel Klushantsev (1910–1999), a Russian film director, producer, screenwriter of popular-science films	JPL · 321046

== 321101–321200 ==
back to top

Named minor planet	Provisional	This minor planet was named for...	Ref · Catalog
321131 Alishan	2008 UO_{87}	The Alishan Range, located between Chiayi and Nantou, is a mountain area over 2,000 meters above sea level in central Taiwan. Alishan is well known for its sunrises, a sea of clouds, an afterglow, a forest, and railways.	IAU · 321131
321197 Qingdao	2008 YK_{8}	The Chinese city of Qingdao (or Tsingtao), a mayor tourist and harbor city on the Shandong Peninsula in Eastern China, where a campus of the Shandong University of Science and Technology is also located.	IAU · 321197; IAU

== 321201–321300 ==
back to top

Named minor planet	Provisional	This minor planet was named for...	Ref · Catalog
There are no named minor planets in this number range

== 321301–321400 ==
back to top

Named minor planet	Provisional	This minor planet was named for...	Ref · Catalog
321324 Vytautas	2009 HJ_{68}	Vytautas Didysis the Great (1350–1430), one of the most famous rulers of medieval Lithuania.	JPL · 321324
321357 Mirzakhani	2009 MM	Maryam Mirzakhani (1977–2017), a professor at Stanford, was an outstanding Iranian-born mathematician.	JPL · 321357

== 321401–321500 ==
back to top

Named minor planet	Provisional	This minor planet was named for...	Ref · Catalog
321405 Ingehorst	2009 QZ	Inge (born 1938) and Horst Zimmer (born 1931), parents of German co-discoverer Ute Zimmer	JPL · 321405
321453 Alexmarieann	2009 RM_{2}	Aleksandr (born 1987), Mariia (born 1987) and Anna (born 1985), grandchildren of astronomer Klim Churyumov, co-discoverer of comet 67P (Rosetta mission).	JPL · 321453
321480 Juanluiscano	2009 RZ_{69}	Juan Luis Cano, Spanish aerospace engineer and project manager.	IAU · 321480
321484 Marsaalam	2009 SZ_{13}	Marsa Alam, a town in south-eastern Egypt, located on the western shore of the Red Sea.	JPL · 321484
321485 Cross	2009 SK_{19}	Henri-Edmond Cross (1856–1910), born Henri-Edmond-Joseph Delacroix, a French painter and printmaker.	JPL · 321485

== 321501–321600 ==
back to top

Named minor planet	Provisional	This minor planet was named for...	Ref · Catalog
321577 Keanureeves	2009 TA_{27}	Keanu Reeves (born 1964) is a well-known Canadian actor. He is known for his iconic acting roles (including The Matrix, Constantine and Point Break) as well as for his kindness and selflessness.	IAU · 321577

== 321601–321700 ==
back to top

Named minor planet	Provisional	This minor planet was named for...	Ref · Catalog
321673 Huber	2010 CO_{182}	Mark E. Huber (b. 1973), an American researcher.	IAU · 321673

== 321701–321800 ==
back to top

Named minor planet	Provisional	This minor planet was named for...	Ref · Catalog
There are no named minor planets in this number range

== 321801–321900 ==
back to top

Named minor planet	Provisional	This minor planet was named for...	Ref · Catalog
321802 Malaspina	2010 PA_{71}	Alessandro Malaspina (1754–1810) was an Italian navigator. He explored the Pacific Ocean during 1789–1794 in the service of Spain, visiting Chile, Alaska, the Philippines, New Zealand and Australia. He was unjustly sentenced to eight years in prison upon his return and could not publish the report of his journey, which was mostly forgotten for a century.	IAU · 321802

== 321901–322000 ==
back to top

Named minor planet	Provisional	This minor planet was named for...	Ref · Catalog
There are no named minor planets in this number range

back to top

Preceded by 320,001–321,000	Meanings of minor-planet names List of minor planets: 321,001–322,000	Succeeded by 322,001–323,000
