= Meanings of minor-planet names: 322001–323000 =

As minor planet discoveries are confirmed, they are given a permanent number by the IAU's Minor Planet Center (MPC), and the discoverers can then submit names for them, following the IAU's naming conventions. The list below concerns those minor planets in the specified number-range that have received names, and explains the meanings of those names.

Official naming citations of newly named small Solar System bodies are approved and published in a bulletin by IAU's Working Group for Small Bodies Nomenclature (WGSBN). Before May 2021, citations were published in MPC's Minor Planet Circulars for many decades. Recent citations can also be found on the JPL Small-Body Database (SBDB). Until his death in 2016, German astronomer Lutz D. Schmadel compiled these citations into the Dictionary of Minor Planet Names (DMP) and regularly updated the collection.

Based on Paul Herget's The Names of the Minor Planets, Schmadel also researched the unclear origin of numerous asteroids, most of which had been named prior to World War II. This article incorporates text from this source, which is in the public domain: SBDB New namings may only be added to this list below after official publication as the preannouncement of names is condemned. The WGSBN publishes a comprehensive guideline for the naming rules of non-cometary small Solar System bodies.

== 322001–322100 ==
Named minor planet	Provisional	This minor planet was named for...	Ref · Catalog
There are no named minor planets in this number range

== 322101–322200 ==
back to top

Named minor planet	Provisional	This minor planet was named for...	Ref · Catalog
There are no named minor planets in this number range

== 322201–322300 ==
back to top

Named minor planet	Provisional	This minor planet was named for...	Ref · Catalog
There are no named minor planets in this number range

== 322301–322400 ==
back to top

Named minor planet	Provisional	This minor planet was named for...	Ref · Catalog
322390 Planes de Son	2011 QN_{42}	Les Planes de Son, a 1500-meter high plateau in the Catalan Pyrenees, Spain	JPL · 322390

== 322401–322500 ==
back to top

Named minor planet	Provisional	This minor planet was named for...	Ref · Catalog
There are no named minor planets in this number range

== 322501–322600 ==
back to top

Named minor planet	Provisional	This minor planet was named for...	Ref · Catalog
322510 Heinrichgrüber	2011 WR_{68}	Heinrich Grüber (1891–1975), German theologian in Berlin.	JPL · 322510
322539 Telšiai	2011 YS_{27}	Telšiai, one of the oldest cities in Lithuania	IAU · 322539
322574 Werckmeister	2012 AS_{2}	Andreas Werckmeister (1645–1706), an organist and a music theorist.	JPL · 322574
322577 Stephanhellmich	2012 AF_{7}	Stephan Hellmich (born 1981), a German planetary scientist, computer scientist, and discoverer of minor planets, whose thesis was about the influence of the Yarkovsky effect on the long-term stability of Jupiter trojans.	IAU · 322577

== 322601–322700 ==
back to top

Named minor planet	Provisional	This minor planet was named for...	Ref · Catalog
There are no named minor planets in this number range

== 322701–322800 ==
back to top

Named minor planet	Provisional	This minor planet was named for...	Ref · Catalog
There are no named minor planets in this number range

== 322801–322900 ==
back to top

Named minor planet	Provisional	This minor planet was named for...	Ref · Catalog
There are no named minor planets in this number range

== 322901–323000 ==
back to top

Named minor planet	Provisional	This minor planet was named for...	Ref · Catalog
322912 Jedlik	2002 AS_{204}	Ányos Jedlik (1800–1895), a Hungarian inventor, engineer, physicist and Benedictine priest.	JPL · 322912

back to top

Preceded by 321,001–322,000	Meanings of minor-planet names List of minor planets: 322,001–323,000	Succeeded by 323,001–324,000
