= List of minor planets: 325001–326000 =

The following is a partial list of minor planets, running from minor-planet number 325001 through 326000, inclusive. The primary data for this and other partial lists is based on JPL's "Small-Body Orbital Elements" and data available from the Minor Planet Center. Critical list information is also provided by the MPC, unless otherwise specified from Lowell Observatory. A detailed description of the table's columns and additional sources are given on the main page including a complete list of every page in this series, and a statistical break-up on the dynamical classification of minor planets.

Also see the summary list of all named bodies in numerical and alphabetical order, and the corresponding naming citations for the number range of this particular list. New namings may only be added to this list after official publication, as the preannouncement of names is condemned by the Working Group for Small Bodies Nomenclature of the International Astronomical Union.

Near-Earth obj.	MBA (inner)	MBA (outer)	Centaur
Mars-crosser	MBA (middle)	Jupiter trojan	Trans-Neptunian obj.
Unclassified

== 325001–325100 ==
Designation			Discovery			Properties		Ref
Permanent	Provisional	Named after	Date	Site	Discoverer(s)	Category	Diam.	Ref
325001	2008 BH_{29}	—	January 30, 2008	Mount Lemmon	Mount Lemmon Survey	MAS	610 m	MPC · JPL
325002	2008 BL_{31}	—	January 30, 2008	Mount Lemmon	Mount Lemmon Survey	MAS	740 m	MPC · JPL
325003	2008 BW_{34}	—	January 30, 2008	Mount Lemmon	Mount Lemmon Survey	·	1.3 km	MPC · JPL
325004	2008 BQ_{37}	—	January 31, 2008	Kitt Peak	Spacewatch	·	2.4 km	MPC · JPL
325005	2008 BT_{38}	—	January 31, 2008	Mount Lemmon	Mount Lemmon Survey	·	990 m	MPC · JPL
325006	2008 BO_{42}	—	January 31, 2008	Catalina	CSS	·	2.5 km	MPC · JPL
325007	2008 BQ_{43}	—	January 30, 2008	Catalina	CSS	·	1.2 km	MPC · JPL
325008	2008 BX_{44}	—	January 19, 2008	Mount Lemmon	Mount Lemmon Survey	·	1.7 km	MPC · JPL
325009	2008 BM_{45}	—	January 31, 2008	Catalina	CSS	·	1.7 km	MPC · JPL
325010	2008 BG_{47}	—	January 18, 2008	Mount Lemmon	Mount Lemmon Survey	·	2.0 km	MPC · JPL
325011	2008 BU_{49}	—	January 30, 2008	Mount Lemmon	Mount Lemmon Survey	(5)	1.3 km	MPC · JPL
325012	2008 BN_{52}	—	January 20, 2008	Kitt Peak	Spacewatch	·	1.4 km	MPC · JPL
325013	2008 BU_{52}	—	January 31, 2008	Catalina	CSS	V	820 m	MPC · JPL
325014	2008 CX_{5}	—	February 7, 2008	Mayhill	Lowe, A.	·	2.3 km	MPC · JPL
325015	2008 CF_{11}	—	February 3, 2008	Kitt Peak	Spacewatch	·	1.0 km	MPC · JPL
325016	2008 CZ_{14}	—	February 3, 2008	Kitt Peak	Spacewatch	·	1.3 km	MPC · JPL
325017	2008 CO_{17}	—	July 30, 2005	Palomar	NEAT	·	1.4 km	MPC · JPL
325018	2008 CV_{18}	—	February 3, 2008	Kitt Peak	Spacewatch	NYS	970 m	MPC · JPL
325019	2008 CR_{19}	—	February 6, 2008	Anderson Mesa	LONEOS	PHO	1.0 km	MPC · JPL
325020	2008 CA_{21}	—	February 8, 2008	Altschwendt	W. Ries	·	1.3 km	MPC · JPL
325021	2008 CC_{24}	—	February 1, 2008	Kitt Peak	Spacewatch	·	1.8 km	MPC · JPL
325022	2008 CX_{24}	—	February 1, 2008	Kitt Peak	Spacewatch	·	1.3 km	MPC · JPL
325023	2008 CQ_{26}	—	August 18, 2006	Kitt Peak	Spacewatch	·	1.1 km	MPC · JPL
325024	2008 CP_{33}	—	February 2, 2008	Kitt Peak	Spacewatch	·	1.1 km	MPC · JPL
325025	2008 CN_{34}	—	February 2, 2008	Kitt Peak	Spacewatch	MAS	700 m	MPC · JPL
325026	2008 CR_{36}	—	February 2, 2008	Kitt Peak	Spacewatch	·	1.2 km	MPC · JPL
325027	2008 CX_{39}	—	February 2, 2008	Mount Lemmon	Mount Lemmon Survey	MAS	810 m	MPC · JPL
325028	2008 CJ_{42}	—	February 2, 2008	Kitt Peak	Spacewatch	(5)	860 m	MPC · JPL
325029	2008 CK_{48}	—	February 3, 2008	Kitt Peak	Spacewatch	·	1.5 km	MPC · JPL
325030	2008 CQ_{49}	—	November 18, 2007	Mount Lemmon	Mount Lemmon Survey	·	1.5 km	MPC · JPL
325031	2008 CT_{61}	—	February 7, 2008	Kitt Peak	Spacewatch	·	1.0 km	MPC · JPL
325032	2008 CJ_{72}	—	February 8, 2008	La Sagra	OAM	·	1.5 km	MPC · JPL
325033	2008 CP_{74}	—	February 9, 2008	Dauban	Kugel, F.	V	760 m	MPC · JPL
325034	2008 CB_{75}	—	February 10, 2008	Altschwendt	W. Ries	·	1.0 km	MPC · JPL
325035	2008 CP_{91}	—	February 8, 2008	Kitt Peak	Spacewatch	·	1.3 km	MPC · JPL
325036	2008 CE_{95}	—	February 8, 2008	Mount Lemmon	Mount Lemmon Survey	·	1.3 km	MPC · JPL
325037	2008 CN_{96}	—	February 9, 2008	Mount Lemmon	Mount Lemmon Survey	·	860 m	MPC · JPL
325038	2008 CL_{103}	—	February 9, 2008	Kitt Peak	Spacewatch	·	1.6 km	MPC · JPL
325039	2008 CC_{106}	—	February 9, 2008	Mount Lemmon	Mount Lemmon Survey	·	1.2 km	MPC · JPL
325040	2008 CN_{107}	—	February 9, 2008	Mount Lemmon	Mount Lemmon Survey	·	1.4 km	MPC · JPL
325041	2008 CZ_{108}	—	February 9, 2008	Kitt Peak	Spacewatch	·	1.5 km	MPC · JPL
325042	2008 CL_{124}	—	February 7, 2008	Mount Lemmon	Mount Lemmon Survey	·	1.1 km	MPC · JPL
325043	2008 CL_{126}	—	January 31, 2008	Mount Lemmon	Mount Lemmon Survey	NYS	1.0 km	MPC · JPL
325044	2008 CK_{130}	—	February 8, 2008	Kitt Peak	Spacewatch	·	1.3 km	MPC · JPL
325045	2008 CW_{136}	—	February 8, 2008	Mount Lemmon	Mount Lemmon Survey	MAS	660 m	MPC · JPL
325046	2008 CC_{137}	—	February 8, 2008	Mount Lemmon	Mount Lemmon Survey	·	1.1 km	MPC · JPL
325047	2008 CV_{137}	—	February 8, 2008	Kitt Peak	Spacewatch	MAS	820 m	MPC · JPL
325048	2008 CM_{140}	—	February 8, 2008	Kitt Peak	Spacewatch	·	1.4 km	MPC · JPL
325049	2008 CN_{152}	—	February 9, 2008	Kitt Peak	Spacewatch	·	1.6 km	MPC · JPL
325050	2008 CV_{154}	—	February 9, 2008	Kitt Peak	Spacewatch	V	610 m	MPC · JPL
325051	2008 CL_{159}	—	February 9, 2008	Kitt Peak	Spacewatch	·	1.9 km	MPC · JPL
325052	2008 CV_{177}	—	September 27, 2006	Mount Lemmon	Mount Lemmon Survey	NYS	1.3 km	MPC · JPL
325053	2008 CV_{178}	—	February 6, 2008	Catalina	CSS	·	1.1 km	MPC · JPL
325054	2008 CV_{179}	—	February 7, 2008	Catalina	CSS	·	1.7 km	MPC · JPL
325055	2008 CV_{189}	—	February 10, 2008	Catalina	CSS	·	1.9 km	MPC · JPL
325056	2008 CV_{190}	—	February 1, 2008	Kitt Peak	Spacewatch	MAS	620 m	MPC · JPL
325057	2008 CF_{191}	—	August 18, 2006	Kitt Peak	Spacewatch	·	940 m	MPC · JPL
325058	2008 CY_{192}	—	February 8, 2008	Kitt Peak	Spacewatch	·	1.2 km	MPC · JPL
325059	2008 CT_{199}	—	February 13, 2008	Mount Lemmon	Mount Lemmon Survey	(5)	1.3 km	MPC · JPL
325060	2008 CF_{200}	—	February 10, 2008	Mount Lemmon	Mount Lemmon Survey	·	1.7 km	MPC · JPL
325061	2008 CG_{202}	—	February 6, 2008	Catalina	CSS	·	3.3 km	MPC · JPL
325062	2008 CL_{203}	—	February 10, 2008	Kitt Peak	Spacewatch	·	1.3 km	MPC · JPL
325063	2008 CM_{208}	—	February 6, 2008	Socorro	LINEAR	V	890 m	MPC · JPL
325064	2008 CW_{208}	—	February 11, 2008	Mount Lemmon	Mount Lemmon Survey	·	3.2 km	MPC · JPL
325065	2008 CJ_{209}	—	March 9, 2004	Palomar	NEAT	EUN	1.5 km	MPC · JPL
325066	2008 CN_{209}	—	February 3, 2008	Mount Lemmon	Mount Lemmon Survey	V	740 m	MPC · JPL
325067	2008 CS_{213}	—	February 10, 2008	Mount Lemmon	Mount Lemmon Survey	V	740 m	MPC · JPL
325068	2008 CX_{213}	—	February 10, 2008	Mount Lemmon	Mount Lemmon Survey	MAR	1.1 km	MPC · JPL
325069	2008 CC_{214}	—	February 10, 2008	Mount Lemmon	Mount Lemmon Survey	·	2.1 km	MPC · JPL
325070	2008 CO_{215}	—	February 13, 2008	Catalina	CSS	·	1.6 km	MPC · JPL
325071	2008 DF	—	January 12, 2008	Catalina	CSS	·	1.7 km	MPC · JPL
325072	2008 DD_{1}	—	February 24, 2008	Kitt Peak	Spacewatch	·	1.3 km	MPC · JPL
325073	2008 DV_{1}	—	February 24, 2008	Mount Lemmon	Mount Lemmon Survey	MAS	740 m	MPC · JPL
325074	2008 DL_{2}	—	January 20, 2008	Kitt Peak	Spacewatch	·	1.9 km	MPC · JPL
325075	2008 DQ_{2}	—	February 24, 2008	Kitt Peak	Spacewatch	·	1.3 km	MPC · JPL
325076	2008 DT_{3}	—	February 24, 2008	Mount Lemmon	Mount Lemmon Survey	NYS	1.5 km	MPC · JPL
325077	2008 DZ_{5}	—	February 1, 2008	Mount Lemmon	Mount Lemmon Survey	NYS	920 m	MPC · JPL
325078	2008 DR_{6}	—	December 31, 2007	Kitt Peak	Spacewatch	·	1.1 km	MPC · JPL
325079	2008 DF_{7}	—	February 24, 2008	Mount Lemmon	Mount Lemmon Survey	MAS	720 m	MPC · JPL
325080	2008 DH_{8}	—	February 24, 2008	Kitt Peak	Spacewatch	·	1.5 km	MPC · JPL
325081	2008 DB_{13}	—	February 26, 2008	Kitt Peak	Spacewatch	·	1.2 km	MPC · JPL
325082	2008 DZ_{13}	—	February 26, 2008	Mount Lemmon	Mount Lemmon Survey	·	1.2 km	MPC · JPL
325083	2008 DO_{25}	—	February 29, 2008	Purple Mountain	PMO NEO Survey Program	·	2.1 km	MPC · JPL
325084	2008 DX_{30}	—	December 30, 2007	Kitt Peak	Spacewatch	NYS	1.1 km	MPC · JPL
325085	2008 DJ_{34}	—	February 27, 2008	Kitt Peak	Spacewatch	·	1.3 km	MPC · JPL
325086	2008 DA_{36}	—	February 27, 2008	Mount Lemmon	Mount Lemmon Survey	·	1.3 km	MPC · JPL
325087	2008 DC_{37}	—	February 27, 2008	Kitt Peak	Spacewatch	·	1.7 km	MPC · JPL
325088	2008 DO_{43}	—	February 28, 2008	Mount Lemmon	Mount Lemmon Survey	NYS	1.1 km	MPC · JPL
325089	2008 DS_{43}	—	February 28, 2008	Mount Lemmon	Mount Lemmon Survey	·	1.4 km	MPC · JPL
325090	2008 DU_{45}	—	February 28, 2008	Mount Lemmon	Mount Lemmon Survey	·	1.5 km	MPC · JPL
325091	2008 DE_{53}	—	February 29, 2008	Mount Lemmon	Mount Lemmon Survey	·	1.6 km	MPC · JPL
325092	2008 DX_{53}	—	February 29, 2008	Kitt Peak	Spacewatch	·	1.5 km	MPC · JPL
325093	2008 DB_{54}	—	February 26, 2008	Anderson Mesa	LONEOS	NYS	1.3 km	MPC · JPL
325094	2008 DE_{64}	—	February 28, 2008	Mount Lemmon	Mount Lemmon Survey	·	1.1 km	MPC · JPL
325095	2008 DA_{68}	—	February 29, 2008	Kitt Peak	Spacewatch	·	1.9 km	MPC · JPL
325096	2008 DN_{73}	—	February 27, 2008	Mount Lemmon	Mount Lemmon Survey	·	1.6 km	MPC · JPL
325097	2008 DJ_{78}	—	February 28, 2008	Mount Lemmon	Mount Lemmon Survey	·	3.5 km	MPC · JPL
325098	2008 DQ_{81}	—	February 27, 2008	Mount Lemmon	Mount Lemmon Survey	MIS	2.7 km	MPC · JPL
325099	2008 DG_{82}	—	February 28, 2008	Kitt Peak	Spacewatch	MAR	1.2 km	MPC · JPL
325100	2008 DP_{85}	—	February 28, 2008	Kitt Peak	Spacewatch	·	1.5 km	MPC · JPL

== 325101–325200 ==
back to top

Designation			Discovery			Properties		Ref
Permanent	Provisional	Named after	Date	Site	Discoverer(s)	Category	Diam.	Ref
325101	2008 DY_{87}	—	February 18, 2008	Mount Lemmon	Mount Lemmon Survey	EUN	1.9 km	MPC · JPL
325102	2008 EY_{5}	—	March 4, 2008	Siding Spring	SSS	ATE	360 m	MPC · JPL
325103	2008 EQ_{11}	—	March 1, 2008	Kitt Peak	Spacewatch	·	2.6 km	MPC · JPL
325104	2008 EZ_{15}	—	March 1, 2008	Kitt Peak	Spacewatch	·	2.1 km	MPC · JPL
325105	2008 EJ_{20}	—	March 2, 2008	Kitt Peak	Spacewatch	·	1.8 km	MPC · JPL
325106	2008 EV_{29}	—	March 4, 2008	Mount Lemmon	Mount Lemmon Survey	·	1.9 km	MPC · JPL
325107	2008 EL_{33}	—	March 1, 2008	Kitt Peak	Spacewatch	(5)	1.9 km	MPC · JPL
325108	2008 EQ_{33}	—	July 7, 2002	Kitt Peak	Spacewatch	NYS	1.2 km	MPC · JPL
325109	2008 EY_{33}	—	March 1, 2008	Mount Lemmon	Mount Lemmon Survey	·	770 m	MPC · JPL
325110	2008 EZ_{41}	—	March 4, 2008	Kitt Peak	Spacewatch	·	1.3 km	MPC · JPL
325111	2008 EQ_{43}	—	March 5, 2008	Mount Lemmon	Mount Lemmon Survey	·	1.6 km	MPC · JPL
325112	2008 EM_{44}	—	March 5, 2008	Kitt Peak	Spacewatch	NYS	1.3 km	MPC · JPL
325113	2008 ER_{44}	—	March 5, 2008	Kitt Peak	Spacewatch	·	1.1 km	MPC · JPL
325114	2008 EH_{45}	—	February 13, 2008	Mount Lemmon	Mount Lemmon Survey	·	970 m	MPC · JPL
325115	2008 EX_{47}	—	March 5, 2008	Kitt Peak	Spacewatch	·	1.2 km	MPC · JPL
325116	2008 EG_{48}	—	March 5, 2008	Kitt Peak	Spacewatch	·	1.6 km	MPC · JPL
325117	2008 EK_{50}	—	March 6, 2008	Mount Lemmon	Mount Lemmon Survey	MAS	760 m	MPC · JPL
325118	2008 EA_{64}	—	March 9, 2008	Kitt Peak	Spacewatch	·	1.2 km	MPC · JPL
325119	2008 EQ_{66}	—	March 9, 2008	Mount Lemmon	Mount Lemmon Survey	·	1.3 km	MPC · JPL
325120	2008 EB_{68}	—	February 12, 2008	Mount Lemmon	Mount Lemmon Survey	·	1.2 km	MPC · JPL
325121	2008 EA_{71}	—	March 6, 2008	Mount Lemmon	Mount Lemmon Survey	·	1.3 km	MPC · JPL
325122	2008 ES_{81}	—	March 10, 2008	Kitt Peak	Spacewatch	·	1.7 km	MPC · JPL
325123	2008 EH_{86}	—	March 7, 2008	Kitt Peak	Spacewatch	·	1.3 km	MPC · JPL
325124	2008 EM_{100}	—	March 11, 2008	Catalina	CSS	·	1.5 km	MPC · JPL
325125	2008 EE_{110}	—	March 8, 2008	Mount Lemmon	Mount Lemmon Survey	·	1.4 km	MPC · JPL
325126	2008 EM_{113}	—	March 8, 2008	Mount Lemmon	Mount Lemmon Survey	·	1.2 km	MPC · JPL
325127	2008 EL_{119}	—	March 9, 2008	Mount Lemmon	Mount Lemmon Survey	V	1.0 km	MPC · JPL
325128	2008 EQ_{119}	—	March 9, 2008	Kitt Peak	Spacewatch	·	1.3 km	MPC · JPL
325129	2008 EN_{122}	—	March 9, 2008	Kitt Peak	Spacewatch	·	1.3 km	MPC · JPL
325130	2008 EO_{123}	—	March 10, 2008	Kitt Peak	Spacewatch	·	1.5 km	MPC · JPL
325131	2008 EC_{127}	—	March 10, 2008	Kitt Peak	Spacewatch	NYS	1.2 km	MPC · JPL
325132	2008 EX_{129}	—	February 29, 2008	Kitt Peak	Spacewatch	·	1.9 km	MPC · JPL
325133	2008 EO_{139}	—	March 11, 2008	Kitt Peak	Spacewatch	·	2.7 km	MPC · JPL
325134	2008 EQ_{143}	—	March 14, 2008	Catalina	CSS	·	1.9 km	MPC · JPL
325135	2008 EK_{146}	—	March 13, 2008	Mount Lemmon	Mount Lemmon Survey	·	1.5 km	MPC · JPL
325136 Zhongnanshan	2008 ED_{149}	Zhongnanshan	March 2, 2008	XuYi	PMO NEO Survey Program	EUN · slow	2.3 km	MPC · JPL
325137	2008 EL_{149}	—	March 4, 2008	Kitt Peak	Spacewatch	·	1.8 km	MPC · JPL
325138	2008 ED_{150}	—	March 7, 2008	Catalina	CSS	·	1.2 km	MPC · JPL
325139	2008 ET_{150}	—	March 4, 2008	Mount Lemmon	Mount Lemmon Survey	·	1.5 km	MPC · JPL
325140	2008 EE_{152}	—	March 10, 2008	Kitt Peak	Spacewatch	·	1.7 km	MPC · JPL
325141	2008 EJ_{152}	—	March 10, 2008	Kitt Peak	Spacewatch	·	1.1 km	MPC · JPL
325142	2008 EQ_{153}	—	March 9, 2008	Kitt Peak	Spacewatch	(5)	1.6 km	MPC · JPL
325143	2008 ET_{154}	—	March 4, 2008	Mount Lemmon	Mount Lemmon Survey	·	1.2 km	MPC · JPL
325144	2008 EL_{156}	—	March 2, 2008	Kitt Peak	Spacewatch	·	1.3 km	MPC · JPL
325145	2008 ED_{157}	—	March 13, 2008	Kitt Peak	Spacewatch	EUN	2.4 km	MPC · JPL
325146	2008 EZ_{158}	—	March 12, 2008	Mount Lemmon	Mount Lemmon Survey	·	1.3 km	MPC · JPL
325147	2008 EX_{165}	—	March 4, 2008	Mount Lemmon	Mount Lemmon Survey	·	940 m	MPC · JPL
325148	2008 EE_{166}	—	March 5, 2008	Mount Lemmon	Mount Lemmon Survey	·	2.0 km	MPC · JPL
325149	2008 EP_{166}	—	March 6, 2008	Catalina	CSS	PHO	1.6 km	MPC · JPL
325150	2008 EE_{167}	—	March 7, 2008	Mount Lemmon	Mount Lemmon Survey	EUN	1.8 km	MPC · JPL
325151	2008 EB_{169}	—	March 14, 2008	Catalina	CSS	·	1.6 km	MPC · JPL
325152	2008 EC_{169}	—	March 15, 2008	Kitt Peak	Spacewatch	·	3.8 km	MPC · JPL
325153	2008 FS_{3}	—	March 25, 2008	Kitt Peak	Spacewatch	·	1.4 km	MPC · JPL
325154	2008 FQ_{4}	—	March 25, 2008	Kitt Peak	Spacewatch	·	1.1 km	MPC · JPL
325155	2008 FC_{10}	—	March 26, 2008	Kitt Peak	Spacewatch	·	1.4 km	MPC · JPL
325156	2008 FO_{13}	—	March 26, 2008	Mount Lemmon	Mount Lemmon Survey	·	1.3 km	MPC · JPL
325157	2008 FO_{14}	—	March 26, 2008	Mount Lemmon	Mount Lemmon Survey	·	1.6 km	MPC · JPL
325158	2008 FW_{19}	—	March 27, 2008	Mount Lemmon	Mount Lemmon Survey	NYS	1.2 km	MPC · JPL
325159	2008 FD_{20}	—	March 27, 2008	Mount Lemmon	Mount Lemmon Survey	MAR	3.1 km	MPC · JPL
325160	2008 FM_{22}	—	March 27, 2008	Kitt Peak	Spacewatch	(5)	1.7 km	MPC · JPL
325161	2008 FL_{24}	—	March 27, 2008	Kitt Peak	Spacewatch	·	1.8 km	MPC · JPL
325162	2008 FW_{26}	—	March 27, 2008	Kitt Peak	Spacewatch	·	1.2 km	MPC · JPL
325163	2008 FN_{37}	—	March 28, 2008	Kitt Peak	Spacewatch	·	1.4 km	MPC · JPL
325164	2008 FH_{38}	—	March 28, 2008	Kitt Peak	Spacewatch	·	1.7 km	MPC · JPL
325165	2008 FJ_{42}	—	March 28, 2008	Mount Lemmon	Mount Lemmon Survey	·	1.2 km	MPC · JPL
325166	2008 FS_{46}	—	March 28, 2008	Mount Lemmon	Mount Lemmon Survey	·	1.2 km	MPC · JPL
325167	2008 FL_{49}	—	March 28, 2008	Mount Lemmon	Mount Lemmon Survey	·	1.9 km	MPC · JPL
325168	2008 FS_{49}	—	March 28, 2008	Mount Lemmon	Mount Lemmon Survey	·	1.1 km	MPC · JPL
325169	2008 FZ_{50}	—	March 28, 2008	Mount Lemmon	Mount Lemmon Survey	·	1.3 km	MPC · JPL
325170	2008 FC_{51}	—	March 28, 2008	Mount Lemmon	Mount Lemmon Survey	·	1.3 km	MPC · JPL
325171	2008 FP_{54}	—	March 28, 2008	Mount Lemmon	Mount Lemmon Survey	·	1.8 km	MPC · JPL
325172	2008 FX_{54}	—	November 22, 2006	Catalina	CSS	HNS	1.1 km	MPC · JPL
325173	2008 FY_{54}	—	March 28, 2008	Mount Lemmon	Mount Lemmon Survey	·	1.4 km	MPC · JPL
325174	2008 FC_{56}	—	March 28, 2008	Mount Lemmon	Mount Lemmon Survey	·	1.7 km	MPC · JPL
325175	2008 FL_{63}	—	March 27, 2008	Kitt Peak	Spacewatch	·	1.8 km	MPC · JPL
325176	2008 FX_{64}	—	March 28, 2008	Kitt Peak	Spacewatch	·	1.9 km	MPC · JPL
325177	2008 FG_{66}	—	March 28, 2008	Kitt Peak	Spacewatch	·	990 m	MPC · JPL
325178	2008 FR_{68}	—	November 22, 2006	Catalina	CSS	·	1.8 km	MPC · JPL
325179	2008 FT_{69}	—	March 28, 2008	Kitt Peak	Spacewatch	(5)	1.6 km	MPC · JPL
325180	2008 FH_{75}	—	March 31, 2008	Mount Lemmon	Mount Lemmon Survey	·	1.0 km	MPC · JPL
325181	2008 FT_{76}	—	November 11, 2006	Mount Lemmon	Mount Lemmon Survey	·	1.2 km	MPC · JPL
325182	2008 FJ_{77}	—	March 27, 2008	Mount Lemmon	Mount Lemmon Survey	·	1.3 km	MPC · JPL
325183	2008 FC_{84}	—	March 28, 2008	Kitt Peak	Spacewatch	·	1.8 km	MPC · JPL
325184	2008 FT_{88}	—	March 28, 2008	Kitt Peak	Spacewatch	·	1.3 km	MPC · JPL
325185	2008 FF_{89}	—	March 29, 2008	Mount Lemmon	Mount Lemmon Survey	·	910 m	MPC · JPL
325186	2008 FG_{89}	—	March 29, 2008	Mount Lemmon	Mount Lemmon Survey	MAS	810 m	MPC · JPL
325187	2008 FC_{94}	—	March 29, 2008	Kitt Peak	Spacewatch	·	2.4 km	MPC · JPL
325188	2008 FR_{96}	—	March 29, 2008	Catalina	CSS	·	1.8 km	MPC · JPL
325189	2008 FC_{97}	—	March 29, 2008	Mount Lemmon	Mount Lemmon Survey	·	1.7 km	MPC · JPL
325190	2008 FE_{103}	—	March 30, 2008	Kitt Peak	Spacewatch	·	1.6 km	MPC · JPL
325191	2008 FL_{104}	—	March 30, 2008	Kitt Peak	Spacewatch	·	2.2 km	MPC · JPL
325192	2008 FP_{106}	—	March 31, 2008	Kitt Peak	Spacewatch	(5)	1.2 km	MPC · JPL
325193	2008 FK_{108}	—	March 31, 2008	Mount Lemmon	Mount Lemmon Survey	·	1.3 km	MPC · JPL
325194	2008 FT_{111}	—	March 31, 2008	Kitt Peak	Spacewatch	·	1.9 km	MPC · JPL
325195	2008 FY_{111}	—	March 31, 2008	Mount Lemmon	Mount Lemmon Survey	·	1.6 km	MPC · JPL
325196	2008 FY_{113}	—	March 31, 2008	Kitt Peak	Spacewatch	·	2.4 km	MPC · JPL
325197	2008 FX_{118}	—	March 31, 2008	Mount Lemmon	Mount Lemmon Survey	·	2.0 km	MPC · JPL
325198	2008 FH_{120}	—	March 21, 1999	Apache Point	SDSS	·	2.1 km	MPC · JPL
325199	2008 FA_{125}	—	March 30, 2008	Kitt Peak	Spacewatch	·	1.6 km	MPC · JPL
325200	2008 FA_{129}	—	March 29, 2008	Kitt Peak	Spacewatch	·	2.3 km	MPC · JPL

== 325201–325300 ==
back to top

Designation			Discovery			Properties		Ref
Permanent	Provisional	Named after	Date	Site	Discoverer(s)	Category	Diam.	Ref
325201	2008 FE_{131}	—	March 31, 2008	Mount Lemmon	Mount Lemmon Survey	KON	2.7 km	MPC · JPL
325202	2008 FX_{133}	—	March 28, 2008	Mount Lemmon	Mount Lemmon Survey	·	1.2 km	MPC · JPL
325203	2008 FP_{134}	—	March 30, 2008	Kitt Peak	Spacewatch	·	1.0 km	MPC · JPL
325204	2008 FT_{136}	—	March 29, 2008	Kitt Peak	Spacewatch	HNS	1.5 km	MPC · JPL
325205	2008 FE_{137}	—	April 1, 2008	Mount Lemmon	Mount Lemmon Survey	·	1.3 km	MPC · JPL
325206	2008 FF_{137}	—	March 30, 2008	Kitt Peak	Spacewatch	·	1.8 km	MPC · JPL
325207	2008 FG_{137}	—	March 30, 2008	Catalina	CSS	·	1.4 km	MPC · JPL
325208	2008 FM_{137}	—	March 30, 2008	Kitt Peak	Spacewatch	·	1.9 km	MPC · JPL
325209	2008 GS_{4}	—	April 1, 2008	Kitt Peak	Spacewatch	·	1.2 km	MPC · JPL
325210	2008 GM_{6}	—	August 9, 2000	Kitt Peak	Spacewatch	·	1.9 km	MPC · JPL
325211	2008 GF_{9}	—	April 1, 2008	Kitt Peak	Spacewatch	·	1.3 km	MPC · JPL
325212	2008 GT_{9}	—	April 1, 2008	Kitt Peak	Spacewatch	·	2.1 km	MPC · JPL
325213	2008 GX_{9}	—	April 1, 2008	Kitt Peak	Spacewatch	·	2.0 km	MPC · JPL
325214	2008 GQ_{15}	—	April 3, 2008	Mount Lemmon	Mount Lemmon Survey	(5)	1.3 km	MPC · JPL
325215	2008 GQ_{17}	—	April 4, 2008	Kitt Peak	Spacewatch	·	2.0 km	MPC · JPL
325216	2008 GQ_{18}	—	April 4, 2008	Catalina	CSS	·	1.8 km	MPC · JPL
325217	2008 GF_{20}	—	April 8, 2008	Desert Eagle	W. K. Y. Yeung	·	2.2 km	MPC · JPL
325218	2008 GZ_{20}	—	April 10, 2008	Desert Eagle	W. K. Y. Yeung	·	1.9 km	MPC · JPL
325219	2008 GT_{21}	—	March 5, 2008	Kitt Peak	Spacewatch	·	1.4 km	MPC · JPL
325220	2008 GO_{29}	—	April 3, 2008	Mount Lemmon	Mount Lemmon Survey	·	1.3 km	MPC · JPL
325221	2008 GT_{30}	—	March 11, 2008	Kitt Peak	Spacewatch	·	1.4 km	MPC · JPL
325222	2008 GS_{32}	—	April 3, 2008	Kitt Peak	Spacewatch	·	1.6 km	MPC · JPL
325223	2008 GQ_{37}	—	April 3, 2008	Kitt Peak	Spacewatch	·	2.1 km	MPC · JPL
325224	2008 GK_{38}	—	April 3, 2008	Mount Lemmon	Mount Lemmon Survey	·	2.2 km	MPC · JPL
325225	2008 GO_{38}	—	April 3, 2008	Mount Lemmon	Mount Lemmon Survey	·	2.1 km	MPC · JPL
325226	2008 GD_{39}	—	April 3, 2008	Kitt Peak	Spacewatch	·	1.6 km	MPC · JPL
325227	2008 GJ_{40}	—	April 4, 2008	Mount Lemmon	Mount Lemmon Survey	NYS	1.2 km	MPC · JPL
325228	2008 GD_{41}	—	April 4, 2008	Kitt Peak	Spacewatch	·	1.4 km	MPC · JPL
325229	2008 GE_{43}	—	April 4, 2008	Mount Lemmon	Mount Lemmon Survey	WIT	910 m	MPC · JPL
325230	2008 GJ_{43}	—	April 4, 2008	Mount Lemmon	Mount Lemmon Survey	(5)	1.4 km	MPC · JPL
325231	2008 GD_{46}	—	April 4, 2008	Kitt Peak	Spacewatch	·	1.9 km	MPC · JPL
325232	2008 GD_{49}	—	April 5, 2008	Kitt Peak	Spacewatch	·	1.9 km	MPC · JPL
325233	2008 GU_{52}	—	April 5, 2008	Mount Lemmon	Mount Lemmon Survey	·	1.5 km	MPC · JPL
325234	2008 GX_{57}	—	April 5, 2008	Mount Lemmon	Mount Lemmon Survey	·	1.4 km	MPC · JPL
325235	2008 GT_{62}	—	April 5, 2008	Catalina	CSS	·	1.2 km	MPC · JPL
325236	2008 GF_{64}	—	April 5, 2008	Kitt Peak	Spacewatch	MIS	2.6 km	MPC · JPL
325237	2008 GV_{64}	—	April 6, 2008	Kitt Peak	Spacewatch	·	1.2 km	MPC · JPL
325238	2008 GK_{67}	—	April 6, 2008	Kitt Peak	Spacewatch	·	1.3 km	MPC · JPL
325239	2008 GC_{68}	—	April 6, 2008	Kitt Peak	Spacewatch	·	2.4 km	MPC · JPL
325240	2008 GG_{68}	—	April 6, 2008	Kitt Peak	Spacewatch	·	2.1 km	MPC · JPL
325241	2008 GU_{69}	—	April 6, 2008	Mount Lemmon	Mount Lemmon Survey	·	2.8 km	MPC · JPL
325242	2008 GQ_{70}	—	April 7, 2008	Kitt Peak	Spacewatch	·	1.2 km	MPC · JPL
325243	2008 GY_{71}	—	April 7, 2008	Kitt Peak	Spacewatch	·	1.2 km	MPC · JPL
325244	2008 GB_{74}	—	April 7, 2008	Kitt Peak	Spacewatch	·	2.5 km	MPC · JPL
325245	2008 GO_{74}	—	April 7, 2008	Kitt Peak	Spacewatch	·	2.5 km	MPC · JPL
325246	2008 GU_{76}	—	April 7, 2008	Kitt Peak	Spacewatch	·	1.6 km	MPC · JPL
325247	2008 GZ_{78}	—	April 7, 2008	Kitt Peak	Spacewatch	·	1.4 km	MPC · JPL
325248	2008 GF_{80}	—	April 7, 2008	Mount Lemmon	Mount Lemmon Survey	·	2.0 km	MPC · JPL
325249	2008 GN_{81}	—	April 7, 2008	Kitt Peak	Spacewatch	PAD	2.0 km	MPC · JPL
325250	2008 GK_{83}	—	April 8, 2008	Kitt Peak	Spacewatch	·	1.4 km	MPC · JPL
325251	2008 GJ_{85}	—	April 1, 2008	Mount Lemmon	Mount Lemmon Survey	·	1.5 km	MPC · JPL
325252	2008 GB_{90}	—	April 6, 2008	Mount Lemmon	Mount Lemmon Survey	·	1.0 km	MPC · JPL
325253	2008 GY_{90}	—	April 6, 2008	Mount Lemmon	Mount Lemmon Survey	·	2.1 km	MPC · JPL
325254	2008 GK_{91}	—	April 6, 2008	Mount Lemmon	Mount Lemmon Survey	·	1.7 km	MPC · JPL
325255	2008 GP_{96}	—	April 8, 2008	Kitt Peak	Spacewatch	·	1.9 km	MPC · JPL
325256	2008 GL_{97}	—	April 8, 2008	Kitt Peak	Spacewatch	·	1.4 km	MPC · JPL
325257	2008 GH_{98}	—	April 8, 2008	Kitt Peak	Spacewatch	·	1.5 km	MPC · JPL
325258	2008 GA_{99}	—	April 9, 2008	Kitt Peak	Spacewatch	·	3.3 km	MPC · JPL
325259	2008 GC_{99}	—	April 9, 2008	Kitt Peak	Spacewatch	·	1.0 km	MPC · JPL
325260	2008 GC_{103}	—	April 10, 2008	Kitt Peak	Spacewatch	·	2.2 km	MPC · JPL
325261	2008 GO_{106}	—	April 11, 2008	Catalina	CSS	·	2.1 km	MPC · JPL
325262	2008 GP_{109}	—	April 13, 2008	Mount Lemmon	Mount Lemmon Survey	·	1.8 km	MPC · JPL
325263	2008 GX_{109}	—	April 13, 2008	Calvin-Rehoboth	Calvin College	·	2.0 km	MPC · JPL
325264	2008 GZ_{109}	—	April 13, 2008	Mount Lemmon	Mount Lemmon Survey	·	1.3 km	MPC · JPL
325265	2008 GQ_{113}	—	March 4, 2008	Kitt Peak	Spacewatch	·	1.1 km	MPC · JPL
325266	2008 GR_{114}	—	April 11, 2008	Kitt Peak	Spacewatch	·	1.8 km	MPC · JPL
325267	2008 GC_{115}	—	April 11, 2008	Kitt Peak	Spacewatch	·	1.2 km	MPC · JPL
325268	2008 GG_{117}	—	April 3, 2008	Kitt Peak	Spacewatch	·	2.1 km	MPC · JPL
325269	2008 GL_{118}	—	March 30, 2008	Kitt Peak	Spacewatch	·	1.5 km	MPC · JPL
325270	2008 GE_{120}	—	November 22, 2006	Mount Lemmon	Mount Lemmon Survey	·	1.7 km	MPC · JPL
325271	2008 GO_{120}	—	April 12, 2008	Mount Lemmon	Mount Lemmon Survey	·	1.6 km	MPC · JPL
325272	2008 GY_{121}	—	April 13, 2008	Kitt Peak	Spacewatch	AGN	1.5 km	MPC · JPL
325273	2008 GH_{128}	—	April 9, 2008	Catalina	CSS	BAR	1.5 km	MPC · JPL
325274	2008 GV_{129}	—	April 4, 2008	Mount Lemmon	Mount Lemmon Survey	KON	2.3 km	MPC · JPL
325275	2008 GY_{130}	—	April 7, 2008	Kitt Peak	Spacewatch	·	1.4 km	MPC · JPL
325276	2008 GA_{131}	—	April 7, 2008	Catalina	CSS	·	2.0 km	MPC · JPL
325277	2008 GE_{131}	—	April 7, 2008	Kitt Peak	Spacewatch	·	1.5 km	MPC · JPL
325278	2008 GQ_{132}	—	April 14, 2008	Kitt Peak	Spacewatch	·	1.9 km	MPC · JPL
325279	2008 GC_{133}	—	April 15, 2008	Mount Lemmon	Mount Lemmon Survey	·	2.5 km	MPC · JPL
325280	2008 GB_{134}	—	April 6, 2008	Mount Lemmon	Mount Lemmon Survey	·	2.5 km	MPC · JPL
325281	2008 GA_{137}	—	December 13, 2006	Kitt Peak	Spacewatch	(7744)	1.5 km	MPC · JPL
325282	2008 GU_{137}	—	April 7, 2008	Kitt Peak	Spacewatch	·	1.5 km	MPC · JPL
325283	2008 GS_{138}	—	April 7, 2008	Kitt Peak	Spacewatch	·	1.9 km	MPC · JPL
325284	2008 GO_{141}	—	April 15, 2008	Kitt Peak	Spacewatch	·	1.6 km	MPC · JPL
325285	2008 GX_{144}	—	April 5, 2008	Kitt Peak	Spacewatch	EUN	1.5 km	MPC · JPL
325286	2008 GB_{145}	—	April 5, 2008	Kitt Peak	Spacewatch	GEF	1.4 km	MPC · JPL
325287	2008 HQ_{6}	—	April 24, 2008	Kitt Peak	Spacewatch	·	1.2 km	MPC · JPL
325288	2008 HS_{8}	—	April 24, 2008	Kitt Peak	Spacewatch	GEF	1.6 km	MPC · JPL
325289	2008 HC_{12}	—	April 24, 2008	Catalina	CSS	·	2.0 km	MPC · JPL
325290	2008 HH_{13}	—	April 25, 2008	Kitt Peak	Spacewatch	·	1.5 km	MPC · JPL
325291	2008 HB_{15}	—	April 25, 2008	Kitt Peak	Spacewatch	·	1.8 km	MPC · JPL
325292	2008 HO_{15}	—	April 25, 2008	Kitt Peak	Spacewatch	·	1.2 km	MPC · JPL
325293	2008 HU_{16}	—	April 25, 2008	Mount Lemmon	Mount Lemmon Survey	·	1.8 km	MPC · JPL
325294	2008 HX_{23}	—	April 27, 2008	Kitt Peak	Spacewatch	·	1.8 km	MPC · JPL
325295	2008 HW_{27}	—	April 28, 2008	Kitt Peak	Spacewatch	(5)	1.0 km	MPC · JPL
325296	2008 HU_{28}	—	January 27, 2007	Kitt Peak	Spacewatch	·	2.1 km	MPC · JPL
325297	2008 HF_{34}	—	April 27, 2008	Kitt Peak	Spacewatch	·	1.8 km	MPC · JPL
325298	2008 HD_{35}	—	April 28, 2008	Kitt Peak	Spacewatch	·	2.0 km	MPC · JPL
325299	2008 HM_{35}	—	April 28, 2008	Kitt Peak	Spacewatch	·	1.5 km	MPC · JPL
325300	2008 HY_{35}	—	April 29, 2008	Mount Lemmon	Mount Lemmon Survey	JUN	1.1 km	MPC · JPL

== 325301–325400 ==
back to top

Designation			Discovery			Properties		Ref
Permanent	Provisional	Named after	Date	Site	Discoverer(s)	Category	Diam.	Ref
325301	2008 HY_{36}	—	April 30, 2008	Kitt Peak	Spacewatch	·	2.7 km	MPC · JPL
325302	2008 HS_{42}	—	April 27, 2008	Mount Lemmon	Mount Lemmon Survey	·	1.4 km	MPC · JPL
325303	2008 HV_{45}	—	April 28, 2008	Kitt Peak	Spacewatch	·	2.0 km	MPC · JPL
325304	2008 HV_{46}	—	April 28, 2008	Kitt Peak	Spacewatch	EUN	1.6 km	MPC · JPL
325305	2008 HU_{51}	—	April 29, 2008	Kitt Peak	Spacewatch	·	1.8 km	MPC · JPL
325306	2008 HR_{52}	—	April 29, 2008	Kitt Peak	Spacewatch	·	2.0 km	MPC · JPL
325307	2008 HK_{61}	—	April 30, 2008	Mount Lemmon	Mount Lemmon Survey	(7744)	1.6 km	MPC · JPL
325308	2008 HC_{62}	—	March 15, 2008	Mount Lemmon	Mount Lemmon Survey	·	1.8 km	MPC · JPL
325309	2008 HO_{62}	—	April 30, 2008	Kitt Peak	Spacewatch	·	2.2 km	MPC · JPL
325310	2008 HR_{65}	—	April 29, 2008	Socorro	LINEAR	·	2.4 km	MPC · JPL
325311	2008 HK_{66}	—	April 26, 2008	Mount Lemmon	Mount Lemmon Survey	·	1.5 km	MPC · JPL
325312	2008 HB_{67}	—	April 24, 2008	Kitt Peak	Spacewatch	·	2.3 km	MPC · JPL
325313	2008 HU_{68}	—	April 26, 2008	Kitt Peak	Spacewatch	·	2.1 km	MPC · JPL
325314	2008 HW_{68}	—	April 29, 2008	Kitt Peak	Spacewatch	·	1.6 km	MPC · JPL
325315	2008 HY_{68}	—	April 30, 2008	Mount Lemmon	Mount Lemmon Survey	EOS	2.5 km	MPC · JPL
325316	2008 HY_{69}	—	April 29, 2008	Kitt Peak	Spacewatch	·	1.4 km	MPC · JPL
325317	2008 HL_{70}	—	April 29, 2008	Mount Lemmon	Mount Lemmon Survey	·	1.7 km	MPC · JPL
325318	2008 JH_{2}	—	May 2, 2008	Kitt Peak	Spacewatch	·	2.0 km	MPC · JPL
325319	2008 JQ_{2}	—	May 2, 2008	Dauban	Kugel, F.	V	770 m	MPC · JPL
325320	2008 JX_{4}	—	March 5, 2008	Mount Lemmon	Mount Lemmon Survey	·	2.4 km	MPC · JPL
325321	2008 JW_{5}	—	May 3, 2008	Mount Lemmon	Mount Lemmon Survey	·	2.6 km	MPC · JPL
325322	2008 JS_{8}	—	April 30, 2008	Mount Lemmon	Mount Lemmon Survey	·	2.7 km	MPC · JPL
325323	2008 JR_{12}	—	May 3, 2008	Kitt Peak	Spacewatch	·	2.0 km	MPC · JPL
325324	2008 JY_{12}	—	May 3, 2008	Kitt Peak	Spacewatch	·	1.9 km	MPC · JPL
325325	2008 JA_{14}	—	May 6, 2008	Mount Lemmon	Mount Lemmon Survey	·	2.1 km	MPC · JPL
325326	2008 JK_{15}	—	May 2, 2008	Kitt Peak	Spacewatch	·	2.3 km	MPC · JPL
325327	2008 JV_{16}	—	April 6, 2008	Mount Lemmon	Mount Lemmon Survey	HNS	1.2 km	MPC · JPL
325328	2008 JX_{17}	—	May 4, 2008	Kitt Peak	Spacewatch	·	2.2 km	MPC · JPL
325329	2008 JR_{19}	—	May 7, 2008	Mount Lemmon	Mount Lemmon Survey	·	1.1 km	MPC · JPL
325330	2008 JK_{24}	—	May 7, 2008	Uccle	T. Pauwels	·	2.8 km	MPC · JPL
325331	2008 JM_{27}	—	May 8, 2008	Kitt Peak	Spacewatch	·	1.2 km	MPC · JPL
325332	2008 JK_{32}	—	April 26, 2008	Mount Lemmon	Mount Lemmon Survey	·	1.8 km	MPC · JPL
325333	2008 JN_{33}	—	May 11, 2008	Kitt Peak	Spacewatch	·	2.4 km	MPC · JPL
325334	2008 JY_{35}	—	May 3, 2008	Kitt Peak	Spacewatch	·	1.8 km	MPC · JPL
325335	2008 JR_{36}	—	May 5, 2008	Kitt Peak	Spacewatch	·	1.8 km	MPC · JPL
325336	2008 JG_{37}	—	May 14, 2008	Mount Lemmon	Mount Lemmon Survey	·	2.6 km	MPC · JPL
325337	2008 JH_{37}	—	May 15, 2008	Kitt Peak	Spacewatch	·	2.4 km	MPC · JPL
325338	2008 JG_{38}	—	May 6, 2008	Mount Lemmon	Mount Lemmon Survey	MIS	3.0 km	MPC · JPL
325339	2008 JD_{40}	—	May 3, 2008	Mount Lemmon	Mount Lemmon Survey	·	1.7 km	MPC · JPL
325340	2008 KX	—	May 26, 2008	Kitt Peak	Spacewatch	EUN	1.4 km	MPC · JPL
325341	2008 KQ_{1}	—	May 26, 2008	Kitt Peak	Spacewatch	·	1.8 km	MPC · JPL
325342	2008 KD_{8}	—	May 27, 2008	Kitt Peak	Spacewatch	·	2.1 km	MPC · JPL
325343	2008 KU_{9}	—	May 27, 2008	Kitt Peak	Spacewatch	·	1.5 km	MPC · JPL
325344	2008 KB_{10}	—	May 27, 2008	Kitt Peak	Spacewatch	HOF	2.6 km	MPC · JPL
325345	2008 KG_{10}	—	May 28, 2008	Kitt Peak	Spacewatch	·	1.7 km	MPC · JPL
325346	2008 KB_{11}	—	May 29, 2008	Mount Lemmon	Mount Lemmon Survey	BRA	2.0 km	MPC · JPL
325347	2008 KM_{13}	—	May 27, 2008	Kitt Peak	Spacewatch	·	1.7 km	MPC · JPL
325348	2008 KK_{17}	—	May 27, 2008	Kitt Peak	Spacewatch	·	2.3 km	MPC · JPL
325349	2008 KK_{20}	—	May 28, 2008	Kitt Peak	Spacewatch	NEM	2.4 km	MPC · JPL
325350	2008 KN_{23}	—	May 28, 2008	Kitt Peak	Spacewatch	AGN	1.5 km	MPC · JPL
325351	2008 KF_{29}	—	May 29, 2008	Kitt Peak	Spacewatch	·	2.4 km	MPC · JPL
325352	2008 KB_{33}	—	May 29, 2008	Mount Lemmon	Mount Lemmon Survey	·	1.3 km	MPC · JPL
325353	2008 KJ_{38}	—	May 30, 2008	Kitt Peak	Spacewatch	·	1.7 km	MPC · JPL
325354	2008 KT_{41}	—	May 31, 2008	Kitt Peak	Spacewatch	·	2.1 km	MPC · JPL
325355	2008 LX_{6}	—	June 3, 2008	Kitt Peak	Spacewatch	·	3.8 km	MPC · JPL
325356	2008 LU_{11}	—	June 7, 2008	Kitt Peak	Spacewatch	·	2.0 km	MPC · JPL
325357	2008 LS_{12}	—	June 9, 2008	Bergisch Gladbach	W. Bickel	·	3.7 km	MPC · JPL
325358	2008 LG_{13}	—	June 7, 2008	Kitt Peak	Spacewatch	·	1.8 km	MPC · JPL
325359	2008 MP	—	June 24, 2008	Siding Spring	SSS	·	2.4 km	MPC · JPL
325360	2008 MK_{2}	—	June 30, 2008	Kitt Peak	Spacewatch	·	4.4 km	MPC · JPL
325361	2008 NB_{5}	—	July 3, 2008	Siding Spring	SSS	·	6.1 km	MPC · JPL
325362	2008 OZ_{21}	—	July 29, 2008	Kitt Peak	Spacewatch	·	5.8 km	MPC · JPL
325363	2008 PM	—	August 1, 2008	Dauban	Kugel, F.	·	2.8 km	MPC · JPL
325364	2008 PC_{3}	—	August 3, 2008	Dauban	Kugel, F.	·	2.7 km	MPC · JPL
325365	2008 PN_{17}	—	July 30, 2008	Catalina	CSS	TIR	4.3 km	MPC · JPL
325366 Asturias	2008 QN_{16}	Asturias	August 24, 2008	La Cañada	Lacruz, J.	·	3.8 km	MPC · JPL
325367	2008 QA_{22}	—	August 26, 2008	Socorro	LINEAR	·	6.4 km	MPC · JPL
325368 Ihorhuk	2008 QK_{24}	Ihorhuk	August 25, 2008	Andrushivka	Andrushivka	·	2.8 km	MPC · JPL
325369 Shishilov	2008 QJ_{29}	Shishilov	August 29, 2008	Zelenchukskaya	Station, Zelenchukskaya	VER	3.3 km	MPC · JPL
325370	2008 QE_{39}	—	August 24, 2008	Kitt Peak	Spacewatch	·	3.5 km	MPC · JPL
325371	2008 QM_{45}	—	August 30, 2008	Socorro	LINEAR	·	4.3 km	MPC · JPL
325372 Irynadyachuk	2008 RS_{22}	Irynadyachuk	September 5, 2008	Andrushivka	Andrushivka	·	4.1 km	MPC · JPL
325373	2008 RW_{40}	—	September 2, 2008	Kitt Peak	Spacewatch	HYG	3.2 km	MPC · JPL
325374	2008 RR_{85}	—	September 5, 2008	Kitt Peak	Spacewatch	L4 · HEK	11 km	MPC · JPL
325375	2008 RR_{125}	—	September 7, 2008	Catalina	CSS	·	2.3 km	MPC · JPL
325376	2008 SH_{3}	—	September 22, 2008	Socorro	LINEAR	·	3.1 km	MPC · JPL
325377	2008 SO_{39}	—	September 20, 2008	Kitt Peak	Spacewatch	CYB	3.8 km	MPC · JPL
325378	2008 SV_{98}	—	September 21, 2008	Kitt Peak	Spacewatch	·	6.0 km	MPC · JPL
325379	2008 SG_{125}	—	September 22, 2008	Mount Lemmon	Mount Lemmon Survey	TIR	3.9 km	MPC · JPL
325380	2008 SQ_{152}	—	September 28, 2008	Goodricke-Pigott	R. A. Tucker	·	5.4 km	MPC · JPL
325381	2008 SH_{181}	—	September 24, 2008	Kitt Peak	Spacewatch	TIR	3.5 km	MPC · JPL
325382	2008 SJ_{230}	—	September 28, 2008	Mount Lemmon	Mount Lemmon Survey	·	2.4 km	MPC · JPL
325383	2008 SC_{251}	—	September 24, 2008	Kitt Peak	Spacewatch	·	3.4 km	MPC · JPL
325384	2008 SC_{268}	—	September 24, 2008	Kitt Peak	Spacewatch	·	4.2 km	MPC · JPL
325385	2008 SG_{276}	—	September 23, 2008	Mount Lemmon	Mount Lemmon Survey	HIL · 3:2	6.3 km	MPC · JPL
325386	2008 SE_{301}	—	September 23, 2008	Socorro	LINEAR	LUT	7.3 km	MPC · JPL
325387	2008 TZ_{37}	—	October 1, 2008	Mount Lemmon	Mount Lemmon Survey	·	3.5 km	MPC · JPL
325388	2008 TM_{115}	—	October 6, 2008	Mount Lemmon	Mount Lemmon Survey	·	4.2 km	MPC · JPL
325389	2008 TQ_{135}	—	October 8, 2008	Kitt Peak	Spacewatch	·	3.3 km	MPC · JPL
325390	2008 UA_{69}	—	October 21, 2008	Mount Lemmon	Mount Lemmon Survey	·	4.3 km	MPC · JPL
325391	2008 UM_{361}	—	October 27, 2008	Catalina	CSS	slow	3.6 km	MPC · JPL
325392	2008 VZ_{26}	—	November 2, 2008	Kitt Peak	Spacewatch	H	610 m	MPC · JPL
325393	2008 WW_{65}	—	November 17, 2008	Kitt Peak	Spacewatch	H	850 m	MPC · JPL
325394	2008 YV_{158}	—	December 30, 2008	Mount Lemmon	Mount Lemmon Survey	H	640 m	MPC · JPL
325395	2009 CQ_{5}	—	February 14, 2009	Catalina	CSS	ATE +1km · PHA	1.2 km	MPC · JPL
325396	2009 DO_{129}	—	February 27, 2009	Kitt Peak	Spacewatch	·	600 m	MPC · JPL
325397	2009 DQ_{136}	—	February 20, 2009	Kitt Peak	Spacewatch	·	720 m	MPC · JPL
325398	2009 EF_{27}	—	March 15, 2009	Kitt Peak	Spacewatch	·	700 m	MPC · JPL
325399	2009 EN_{28}	—	March 2, 2009	Mount Lemmon	Mount Lemmon Survey	·	790 m	MPC · JPL
325400	2009 EU_{30}	—	March 2, 2009	Mount Lemmon	Mount Lemmon Survey	·	960 m	MPC · JPL

== 325401–325500 ==
back to top

Designation			Discovery			Properties		Ref
Permanent	Provisional	Named after	Date	Site	Discoverer(s)	Category	Diam.	Ref
325401	2009 FB_{72}	—	March 17, 2009	Kitt Peak	Spacewatch	·	820 m	MPC · JPL
325402	2009 HH_{2}	—	March 18, 2009	Kitt Peak	Spacewatch	·	670 m	MPC · JPL
325403	2009 HM_{22}	—	April 17, 2009	Kitt Peak	Spacewatch	(2076)	800 m	MPC · JPL
325404	2009 HO_{27}	—	April 18, 2009	Kitt Peak	Spacewatch	·	770 m	MPC · JPL
325405	2009 HE_{83}	—	April 27, 2009	Mount Lemmon	Mount Lemmon Survey	H	700 m	MPC · JPL
325406	2009 HX_{91}	—	April 29, 2009	Kitt Peak	Spacewatch	·	900 m	MPC · JPL
325407	2009 HC_{92}	—	April 29, 2009	Kitt Peak	Spacewatch	·	1.4 km	MPC · JPL
325408	2009 HH_{100}	—	April 27, 2009	Kitt Peak	Spacewatch	·	870 m	MPC · JPL
325409	2009 JD_{5}	—	May 13, 2009	Catalina	CSS	·	950 m	MPC · JPL
325410	2009 JX_{16}	—	May 14, 2009	Kitt Peak	Spacewatch	·	1.1 km	MPC · JPL
325411	2009 KQ_{1}	—	May 17, 2009	La Sagra	OAM	·	900 m	MPC · JPL
325412	2009 KB_{4}	—	May 24, 2009	Catalina	CSS	·	1.1 km	MPC · JPL
325413	2009 KP_{5}	—	May 24, 2009	Catalina	CSS	·	740 m	MPC · JPL
325414	2009 KX_{7}	—	August 15, 2006	Palomar	NEAT	·	820 m	MPC · JPL
325415	2009 KM_{18}	—	May 27, 2009	Mount Lemmon	Mount Lemmon Survey	·	850 m	MPC · JPL
325416	2009 KB_{19}	—	May 28, 2009	Mount Lemmon	Mount Lemmon Survey	·	680 m	MPC · JPL
325417	2009 KF_{22}	—	May 16, 2009	Kitt Peak	Spacewatch	·	1.2 km	MPC · JPL
325418	2009 KY_{35}	—	May 20, 2009	Socorro	LINEAR	·	960 m	MPC · JPL
325419	2009 KA_{36}	—	May 16, 2009	Mount Lemmon	Mount Lemmon Survey	·	910 m	MPC · JPL
325420	2009 MK_{1}	—	March 11, 2005	Mount Lemmon	Mount Lemmon Survey	NYS	1.0 km	MPC · JPL
325421	2009 NF	—	July 1, 2009	Hibiscus	Teamo, N.	·	2.0 km	MPC · JPL
325422	2009 NN_{1}	—	July 15, 2009	La Sagra	OAM	·	1.5 km	MPC · JPL
325423	2009 OC_{2}	—	July 20, 2009	Sierra Stars	R. Matson	·	1.3 km	MPC · JPL
325424	2009 OX_{3}	—	July 22, 2009	Hibiscus	Teamo, N.	·	2.2 km	MPC · JPL
325425	2009 OZ_{5}	—	July 17, 2009	La Sagra	OAM	NYS	1.5 km	MPC · JPL
325426	2009 OZ_{8}	—	July 28, 2009	La Sagra	OAM	EUN	1.2 km	MPC · JPL
325427	2009 OG_{9}	—	July 28, 2009	La Sagra	OAM	·	4.0 km	MPC · JPL
325428	2009 OL_{13}	—	July 27, 2009	Kitt Peak	Spacewatch	·	1.6 km	MPC · JPL
325429	2009 OL_{14}	—	July 30, 2009	Kitt Peak	Spacewatch	·	2.6 km	MPC · JPL
325430	2009 OY_{15}	—	July 28, 2009	Kitt Peak	Spacewatch	·	1.4 km	MPC · JPL
325431	2009 OJ_{16}	—	July 28, 2009	Kitt Peak	Spacewatch	·	1.3 km	MPC · JPL
325432	2009 OJ_{19}	—	July 28, 2009	Kitt Peak	Spacewatch	MAS	850 m	MPC · JPL
325433	2009 OR_{19}	—	July 30, 2009	Calvin-Rehoboth	Calvin College	·	1.2 km	MPC · JPL
325434	2009 OW_{20}	—	July 25, 2009	La Sagra	OAM	PHO	950 m	MPC · JPL
325435	2009 OP_{21}	—	July 26, 2009	Bergisch Gladbach	W. Bickel	KON	2.5 km	MPC · JPL
325436 Khlebov	2009 OJ_{23}	Khlebov	July 26, 2009	Zelenchukskaya Stn	T. V. Krjačko	·	4.2 km	MPC · JPL
325437	2009 PE_{7}	—	August 15, 2009	Kitt Peak	Spacewatch	·	2.2 km	MPC · JPL
325438	2009 PN_{19}	—	August 15, 2009	Kitt Peak	Spacewatch	·	2.1 km	MPC · JPL
325439	2009 PM_{20}	—	August 15, 2009	Kitt Peak	Spacewatch	·	2.7 km	MPC · JPL
325440	2009 PP_{20}	—	August 15, 2009	Kitt Peak	Spacewatch	·	2.3 km	MPC · JPL
325441	2009 QK	—	August 16, 2009	Altschwendt	W. Ries	·	2.4 km	MPC · JPL
325442	2009 QZ_{1}	—	August 17, 2009	Vicques	M. Ory	DOR	3.5 km	MPC · JPL
325443	2009 QT_{3}	—	August 16, 2009	Catalina	CSS	·	2.2 km	MPC · JPL
325444	2009 QE_{6}	—	August 17, 2009	Hibiscus	Teamo, N.	·	2.5 km	MPC · JPL
325445	2009 QG_{6}	—	August 18, 2009	La Sagra	OAM	TIN	1.9 km	MPC · JPL
325446	2009 QD_{13}	—	August 16, 2009	Kitt Peak	Spacewatch	·	3.5 km	MPC · JPL
325447	2009 QR_{13}	—	August 16, 2009	Kitt Peak	Spacewatch	·	1.9 km	MPC · JPL
325448	2009 QC_{14}	—	August 16, 2009	Kitt Peak	Spacewatch	·	2.1 km	MPC · JPL
325449	2009 QN_{14}	—	August 16, 2009	Kitt Peak	Spacewatch	·	1.9 km	MPC · JPL
325450	2009 QM_{15}	—	August 16, 2009	Kitt Peak	Spacewatch	·	1.8 km	MPC · JPL
325451	2009 QN_{16}	—	August 16, 2009	Kitt Peak	Spacewatch	·	2.5 km	MPC · JPL
325452	2009 QA_{19}	—	August 17, 2009	Kitt Peak	Spacewatch	·	4.2 km	MPC · JPL
325453	2009 QZ_{20}	—	August 19, 2009	La Sagra	OAM	·	2.3 km	MPC · JPL
325454	2009 QW_{24}	—	August 18, 2009	Kitt Peak	Spacewatch	·	2.4 km	MPC · JPL
325455 Della Valle	2009 QJ_{26}	Della Valle	August 20, 2009	Magasa	Tonincelli, M., Marinello, W.	·	3.0 km	MPC · JPL
325456	2009 QT_{27}	—	August 17, 2009	La Sagra	OAM	·	2.0 km	MPC · JPL
325457	2009 QZ_{29}	—	August 23, 2009	Taunus	Karge, S., R. Kling	HYG	3.2 km	MPC · JPL
325458	2009 QR_{37}	—	August 27, 2009	Kitt Peak	Spacewatch	EOS	2.8 km	MPC · JPL
325459	2009 QA_{39}	—	August 20, 2009	Kitt Peak	Spacewatch	·	1.8 km	MPC · JPL
325460	2009 QV_{44}	—	August 27, 2009	Catalina	CSS	·	3.1 km	MPC · JPL
325461	2009 QU_{46}	—	August 27, 2009	La Sagra	OAM	NYS	1.8 km	MPC · JPL
325462 Felanitx	2009 QR_{47}	Felanitx	August 28, 2009	La Sagra	OAM	EOS	2.5 km	MPC · JPL
325463	2009 QO_{50}	—	August 28, 2009	Kitt Peak	Spacewatch	·	3.5 km	MPC · JPL
325464	2009 QN_{51}	—	October 22, 2005	Kitt Peak	Spacewatch	·	2.4 km	MPC · JPL
325465	2009 QM_{52}	—	August 16, 2009	Kitt Peak	Spacewatch	NYS	1.2 km	MPC · JPL
325466	2009 QR_{53}	—	August 16, 2009	Kitt Peak	Spacewatch	NYS	1.5 km	MPC · JPL
325467	2009 QN_{54}	—	August 27, 2009	Kitt Peak	Spacewatch	·	2.5 km	MPC · JPL
325468	2009 QO_{55}	—	August 16, 2009	Kitt Peak	Spacewatch	NYS	1.2 km	MPC · JPL
325469	2009 QZ_{56}	—	August 16, 2009	Kitt Peak	Spacewatch	·	3.4 km	MPC · JPL
325470	2009 QO_{57}	—	August 27, 2009	Kitt Peak	Spacewatch	NEM	2.6 km	MPC · JPL
325471	2009 QR_{59}	—	August 21, 2009	Socorro	LINEAR	·	2.2 km	MPC · JPL
325472	2009 QX_{59}	—	August 16, 2009	Kitt Peak	Spacewatch	EOS	2.1 km	MPC · JPL
325473	2009 QM_{61}	—	August 22, 2009	Socorro	LINEAR	·	2.3 km	MPC · JPL
325474	2009 QP_{62}	—	August 16, 2009	Kitt Peak	Spacewatch	KOR	1.2 km	MPC · JPL
325475	2009 QS_{62}	—	August 18, 2009	Kitt Peak	Spacewatch	·	1.3 km	MPC · JPL
325476 Carlomarchioro	2009 RY	Carlomarchioro	September 10, 2009	ESA OGS	ESA OGS	·	2.1 km	MPC · JPL
325477	2009 RG_{1}	—	September 11, 2009	La Sagra	OAM	·	1.8 km	MPC · JPL
325478	2009 RK_{1}	—	September 10, 2009	La Sagra	OAM	·	4.5 km	MPC · JPL
325479	2009 RF_{2}	—	September 12, 2009	Socorro	LINEAR	·	2.1 km	MPC · JPL
325480	2009 RW_{2}	—	September 11, 2009	Piszkéstető	K. Sárneczky	MAR	1.6 km	MPC · JPL
325481	2009 RK_{6}	—	August 19, 2009	Kitt Peak	Spacewatch	EOS	2.7 km	MPC · JPL
325482	2009 RM_{6}	—	September 15, 2009	Bisei SG Center	BATTeRS	·	3.0 km	MPC · JPL
325483	2009 RJ_{8}	—	September 12, 2009	Kitt Peak	Spacewatch	·	2.3 km	MPC · JPL
325484	2009 RX_{8}	—	September 12, 2009	Kitt Peak	Spacewatch	·	3.2 km	MPC · JPL
325485	2009 RL_{9}	—	September 12, 2009	Kitt Peak	Spacewatch	KOR	1.5 km	MPC · JPL
325486	2009 RN_{11}	—	September 12, 2009	Kitt Peak	Spacewatch	HYG	3.0 km	MPC · JPL
325487	2009 RP_{12}	—	September 12, 2009	Kitt Peak	Spacewatch	·	1.2 km	MPC · JPL
325488	2009 RF_{13}	—	September 12, 2009	Kitt Peak	Spacewatch	·	3.3 km	MPC · JPL
325489	2009 RJ_{13}	—	September 12, 2009	Kitt Peak	Spacewatch	·	2.4 km	MPC · JPL
325490	2009 RJ_{15}	—	September 12, 2009	Kitt Peak	Spacewatch	·	1.9 km	MPC · JPL
325491	2009 RP_{17}	—	September 12, 2009	Kitt Peak	Spacewatch	LUT	5.9 km	MPC · JPL
325492	2009 RW_{17}	—	September 12, 2009	Kitt Peak	Spacewatch	·	2.0 km	MPC · JPL
325493	2009 RF_{18}	—	September 12, 2009	Kitt Peak	Spacewatch	·	1.3 km	MPC · JPL
325494	2009 RK_{18}	—	September 12, 2009	Kitt Peak	Spacewatch	·	1.8 km	MPC · JPL
325495	2009 RC_{19}	—	September 13, 2009	Purple Mountain	PMO NEO Survey Program	·	4.1 km	MPC · JPL
325496	2009 RP_{19}	—	September 14, 2009	La Sagra	OAM	GEF	1.8 km	MPC · JPL
325497	2009 RS_{25}	—	September 15, 2009	Kitt Peak	Spacewatch	HOF	3.5 km	MPC · JPL
325498	2009 RK_{28}	—	September 12, 2009	Kitt Peak	Spacewatch	(13314)	2.1 km	MPC · JPL
325499	2009 RL_{30}	—	September 14, 2009	Kitt Peak	Spacewatch	·	2.8 km	MPC · JPL
325500	2009 RX_{34}	—	September 14, 2009	Kitt Peak	Spacewatch	EOS	2.3 km	MPC · JPL

== 325501–325600 ==
back to top

Designation			Discovery			Properties		Ref
Permanent	Provisional	Named after	Date	Site	Discoverer(s)	Category	Diam.	Ref
325501	2009 RP_{35}	—	September 14, 2009	Kitt Peak	Spacewatch	·	4.4 km	MPC · JPL
325502	2009 RK_{43}	—	September 15, 2009	Kitt Peak	Spacewatch	EMA	3.7 km	MPC · JPL
325503	2009 RO_{43}	—	September 15, 2009	Kitt Peak	Spacewatch	·	3.1 km	MPC · JPL
325504	2009 RC_{50}	—	September 15, 2009	Kitt Peak	Spacewatch	·	1.2 km	MPC · JPL
325505	2009 RM_{50}	—	September 15, 2009	Kitt Peak	Spacewatch	·	5.7 km	MPC · JPL
325506	2009 RC_{51}	—	September 15, 2009	Kitt Peak	Spacewatch	ELF	4.8 km	MPC · JPL
325507	2009 RZ_{51}	—	September 15, 2009	Kitt Peak	Spacewatch	EOS	2.5 km	MPC · JPL
325508	2009 RB_{52}	—	September 15, 2009	Kitt Peak	Spacewatch	EUN	1.2 km	MPC · JPL
325509	2009 RA_{53}	—	September 15, 2009	Kitt Peak	Spacewatch	·	3.7 km	MPC · JPL
325510	2009 RD_{53}	—	September 15, 2009	Kitt Peak	Spacewatch	EOS	3.1 km	MPC · JPL
325511	2009 RF_{55}	—	September 15, 2009	Kitt Peak	Spacewatch	·	3.0 km	MPC · JPL
325512	2009 RG_{56}	—	September 15, 2009	Kitt Peak	Spacewatch	ARM	4.0 km	MPC · JPL
325513	2009 RO_{56}	—	September 15, 2009	Kitt Peak	Spacewatch	·	2.2 km	MPC · JPL
325514	2009 RH_{57}	—	September 15, 2009	Kitt Peak	Spacewatch	·	3.3 km	MPC · JPL
325515	2009 RS_{59}	—	September 10, 2009	Catalina	CSS	·	3.4 km	MPC · JPL
325516	2009 RF_{60}	—	September 11, 2009	Catalina	CSS	·	1.9 km	MPC · JPL
325517	2009 RT_{61}	—	January 9, 2002	Kitt Peak	Spacewatch	·	2.8 km	MPC · JPL
325518	2009 RY_{61}	—	September 14, 2009	La Sagra	OAM	·	2.2 km	MPC · JPL
325519	2009 RF_{63}	—	September 13, 2009	Siding Spring	SSS	T_{j} (2.99) · EUP	5.2 km	MPC · JPL
325520	2009 RH_{65}	—	September 15, 2009	Kitt Peak	Spacewatch	·	1.7 km	MPC · JPL
325521	2009 RX_{66}	—	September 15, 2009	Kitt Peak	Spacewatch	·	3.1 km	MPC · JPL
325522	2009 RN_{68}	—	September 15, 2009	Kitt Peak	Spacewatch	·	4.2 km	MPC · JPL
325523	2009 RN_{69}	—	September 15, 2009	Kitt Peak	Spacewatch	·	3.0 km	MPC · JPL
325524	2009 RY_{71}	—	September 15, 2009	Kitt Peak	Spacewatch	·	3.2 km	MPC · JPL
325525	2009 RG_{72}	—	September 15, 2009	Kitt Peak	Spacewatch	TIR	3.2 km	MPC · JPL
325526	2009 RJ_{74}	—	September 13, 2009	Socorro	LINEAR	·	2.3 km	MPC · JPL
325527	2009 SE_{10}	—	September 16, 2009	Mount Lemmon	Mount Lemmon Survey	·	2.9 km	MPC · JPL
325528	2009 SM_{12}	—	September 16, 2009	Mount Lemmon	Mount Lemmon Survey	·	1.8 km	MPC · JPL
325529	2009 SL_{16}	—	September 17, 2009	Mount Lemmon	Mount Lemmon Survey	·	1.2 km	MPC · JPL
325530	2009 SN_{19}	—	September 23, 2009	Mayhill	Lowe, A.	EOS	2.7 km	MPC · JPL
325531	2009 SY_{19}	—	September 18, 2009	Mount Lemmon	Mount Lemmon Survey	·	1.5 km	MPC · JPL
325532	2009 SZ_{19}	—	September 18, 2009	Mount Lemmon	Mount Lemmon Survey	TEL	1.6 km	MPC · JPL
325533	2009 ST_{38}	—	September 16, 2009	Kitt Peak	Spacewatch	·	1.7 km	MPC · JPL
325534	2009 SW_{40}	—	September 16, 2009	Kitt Peak	Spacewatch	·	2.3 km	MPC · JPL
325535	2009 SD_{43}	—	September 16, 2009	Mount Lemmon	Mount Lemmon Survey	·	3.9 km	MPC · JPL
325536	2009 SX_{46}	—	September 16, 2009	Kitt Peak	Spacewatch	·	3.2 km	MPC · JPL
325537	2009 SG_{49}	—	September 17, 2009	La Sagra	OAM	·	2.6 km	MPC · JPL
325538	2009 SF_{50}	—	September 17, 2009	Kitt Peak	Spacewatch	KOR	1.3 km	MPC · JPL
325539	2009 SZ_{56}	—	September 17, 2009	Kitt Peak	Spacewatch	·	4.0 km	MPC · JPL
325540	2009 SE_{57}	—	September 17, 2009	Kitt Peak	Spacewatch	·	2.6 km	MPC · JPL
325541	2009 SG_{58}	—	September 17, 2009	Kitt Peak	Spacewatch	EOS	2.1 km	MPC · JPL
325542	2009 SE_{60}	—	September 17, 2009	Kitt Peak	Spacewatch	·	2.8 km	MPC · JPL
325543	2009 SP_{63}	—	April 29, 2008	Mount Lemmon	Mount Lemmon Survey	·	2.2 km	MPC · JPL
325544	2009 SN_{70}	—	September 17, 2009	Kitt Peak	Spacewatch	·	4.9 km	MPC · JPL
325545	2009 SZ_{70}	—	September 17, 2009	Kitt Peak	Spacewatch	EOS	3.3 km	MPC · JPL
325546	2009 SG_{71}	—	September 17, 2009	Mount Lemmon	Mount Lemmon Survey	·	1.8 km	MPC · JPL
325547	2009 SG_{72}	—	September 17, 2009	Mount Lemmon	Mount Lemmon Survey	·	3.2 km	MPC · JPL
325548	2009 SQ_{74}	—	September 17, 2009	Kitt Peak	Spacewatch	·	2.2 km	MPC · JPL
325549	2009 SG_{75}	—	September 17, 2009	Kitt Peak	Spacewatch	GEF	1.6 km	MPC · JPL
325550	2009 SN_{75}	—	September 17, 2009	Kitt Peak	Spacewatch	·	3.5 km	MPC · JPL
325551	2009 SM_{78}	—	September 18, 2009	Kitt Peak	Spacewatch	(194)	1.9 km	MPC · JPL
325552	2009 SJ_{80}	—	September 18, 2009	Mount Lemmon	Mount Lemmon Survey	·	2.0 km	MPC · JPL
325553	2009 SZ_{81}	—	March 10, 2007	Mount Lemmon	Mount Lemmon Survey	·	1.6 km	MPC · JPL
325554	2009 SO_{83}	—	March 5, 2002	Apache Point	SDSS	·	1.9 km	MPC · JPL
325555	2009 SH_{85}	—	September 18, 2009	Mount Lemmon	Mount Lemmon Survey	·	1.9 km	MPC · JPL
325556	2009 SP_{90}	—	September 18, 2009	Mount Lemmon	Mount Lemmon Survey	·	2.9 km	MPC · JPL
325557	2009 SK_{101}	—	September 22, 2009	Taunus	E. Schwab, R. Kling	·	2.1 km	MPC · JPL
325558 Guyane	2009 SP_{101}	Guyane	September 24, 2009	Tzec Maun	E. Schwab	·	5.0 km	MPC · JPL
325559	2009 SQ_{102}	—	September 23, 2009	Altschwendt	W. Ries	·	2.0 km	MPC · JPL
325560	2009 SY_{104}	—	September 26, 2009	Altschwendt	W. Ries	HYG	3.4 km	MPC · JPL
325561	2009 SC_{107}	—	September 16, 2009	Catalina	CSS	KOR	1.9 km	MPC · JPL
325562	2009 SK_{107}	—	September 16, 2009	Kitt Peak	Spacewatch	PHO	1.0 km	MPC · JPL
325563	2009 SQ_{110}	—	September 17, 2009	Kitt Peak	Spacewatch	·	6.0 km	MPC · JPL
325564	2009 ST_{111}	—	September 18, 2009	Kitt Peak	Spacewatch	·	1.9 km	MPC · JPL
325565	2009 SB_{114}	—	September 18, 2009	Kitt Peak	Spacewatch	·	4.0 km	MPC · JPL
325566	2009 SS_{117}	—	September 18, 2009	Kitt Peak	Spacewatch	·	2.8 km	MPC · JPL
325567	2009 SY_{121}	—	September 18, 2009	Kitt Peak	Spacewatch	·	2.1 km	MPC · JPL
325568	2009 SR_{124}	—	September 18, 2009	Kitt Peak	Spacewatch	·	1.4 km	MPC · JPL
325569	2009 SR_{126}	—	September 18, 2009	Kitt Peak	Spacewatch	EOS	2.7 km	MPC · JPL
325570	2009 SZ_{126}	—	September 18, 2009	Kitt Peak	Spacewatch	·	2.8 km	MPC · JPL
325571	2009 SF_{127}	—	September 18, 2009	Kitt Peak	Spacewatch	·	3.6 km	MPC · JPL
325572	2009 SO_{130}	—	September 18, 2009	Kitt Peak	Spacewatch	·	1.3 km	MPC · JPL
325573	2009 SX_{130}	—	September 18, 2009	Kitt Peak	Spacewatch	·	2.5 km	MPC · JPL
325574	2009 SL_{131}	—	September 18, 2009	Kitt Peak	Spacewatch	EOS	2.6 km	MPC · JPL
325575	2009 SQ_{132}	—	September 18, 2009	Kitt Peak	Spacewatch	·	2.2 km	MPC · JPL
325576	2009 SV_{135}	—	September 18, 2009	Kitt Peak	Spacewatch	·	2.1 km	MPC · JPL
325577	2009 SY_{135}	—	September 18, 2009	Kitt Peak	Spacewatch	·	4.7 km	MPC · JPL
325578	2009 SV_{136}	—	September 18, 2009	Kitt Peak	Spacewatch	·	3.3 km	MPC · JPL
325579	2009 SX_{136}	—	September 18, 2009	Kitt Peak	Spacewatch	·	2.2 km	MPC · JPL
325580	2009 SE_{137}	—	September 18, 2009	Kitt Peak	Spacewatch	JUN	1.4 km	MPC · JPL
325581	2009 SK_{137}	—	September 18, 2009	Kitt Peak	Spacewatch	·	3.6 km	MPC · JPL
325582	2009 SC_{139}	—	September 18, 2009	Purple Mountain	PMO NEO Survey Program	EOS	2.5 km	MPC · JPL
325583	2009 SH_{140}	—	September 19, 2009	Kitt Peak	Spacewatch	·	4.2 km	MPC · JPL
325584	2009 SW_{140}	—	September 19, 2009	Kitt Peak	Spacewatch	·	2.2 km	MPC · JPL
325585	2009 SH_{143}	—	September 19, 2009	Catalina	CSS	·	4.3 km	MPC · JPL
325586	2009 SL_{144}	—	March 27, 2003	Kitt Peak	Spacewatch	·	2.1 km	MPC · JPL
325587	2009 SB_{145}	—	September 19, 2009	Mount Lemmon	Mount Lemmon Survey	NYS	1.4 km	MPC · JPL
325588 Bridžius	2009 SS_{148}	Bridžius	September 19, 2009	Moletai	K. Černis, Zdanavicius, J.	·	4.0 km	MPC · JPL
325589	2009 SG_{150}	—	September 20, 2009	Kitt Peak	Spacewatch	LIX	5.5 km	MPC · JPL
325590	2009 SQ_{154}	—	September 20, 2009	Kitt Peak	Spacewatch	·	2.0 km	MPC · JPL
325591	2009 SV_{156}	—	September 20, 2009	Kitt Peak	Spacewatch	THM	2.6 km	MPC · JPL
325592	2009 SV_{157}	—	September 20, 2009	Kitt Peak	Spacewatch	·	2.0 km	MPC · JPL
325593	2009 SB_{158}	—	September 20, 2009	Mount Lemmon	Mount Lemmon Survey	EMA	4.8 km	MPC · JPL
325594	2009 SD_{158}	—	September 20, 2009	Kitt Peak	Spacewatch	EOS	2.1 km	MPC · JPL
325595	2009 SB_{159}	—	September 20, 2009	Kitt Peak	Spacewatch	526	3.1 km	MPC · JPL
325596	2009 SV_{160}	—	September 20, 2009	Kitt Peak	Spacewatch	·	3.9 km	MPC · JPL
325597	2009 SM_{162}	—	September 11, 2004	Kitt Peak	Spacewatch	NAE	2.4 km	MPC · JPL
325598	2009 SM_{166}	—	September 17, 2003	Kitt Peak	Spacewatch	·	5.8 km	MPC · JPL
325599	2009 SD_{179}	—	September 20, 2009	Mount Lemmon	Mount Lemmon Survey	·	3.7 km	MPC · JPL
325600	2009 SB_{185}	—	September 21, 2009	Kitt Peak	Spacewatch	MRX	1.2 km	MPC · JPL

== 325601–325700 ==
back to top

Designation			Discovery			Properties		Ref
Permanent	Provisional	Named after	Date	Site	Discoverer(s)	Category	Diam.	Ref
325601	2009 SR_{185}	—	September 21, 2009	Kitt Peak	Spacewatch	·	3.2 km	MPC · JPL
325602	2009 SC_{191}	—	September 22, 2009	Kitt Peak	Spacewatch	·	4.3 km	MPC · JPL
325603	2009 SB_{198}	—	September 22, 2009	Kitt Peak	Spacewatch	·	2.7 km	MPC · JPL
325604	2009 SJ_{204}	—	September 22, 2009	Kitt Peak	Spacewatch	CYB	5.3 km	MPC · JPL
325605	2009 SA_{210}	—	September 23, 2009	Kitt Peak	Spacewatch	·	4.2 km	MPC · JPL
325606	2009 SN_{213}	—	September 23, 2009	Catalina	CSS	·	3.2 km	MPC · JPL
325607	2009 ST_{214}	—	September 23, 2009	Kitt Peak	Spacewatch	·	3.8 km	MPC · JPL
325608	2009 SC_{216}	—	September 24, 2009	Kitt Peak	Spacewatch	EOS	3.0 km	MPC · JPL
325609	2009 SU_{216}	—	September 24, 2009	Kitt Peak	Spacewatch	·	2.1 km	MPC · JPL
325610	2009 SE_{217}	—	November 25, 2005	Kitt Peak	Spacewatch	·	2.3 km	MPC · JPL
325611	2009 SG_{230}	—	September 16, 2009	Catalina	CSS	·	3.4 km	MPC · JPL
325612	2009 SN_{231}	—	September 19, 2009	Kitt Peak	Spacewatch	RAF	1.1 km	MPC · JPL
325613	2009 SL_{232}	—	March 27, 1996	Kitt Peak	Spacewatch	EOS	3.0 km	MPC · JPL
325614	2009 SQ_{232}	—	September 19, 2009	Catalina	CSS	·	2.4 km	MPC · JPL
325615	2009 SL_{234}	—	September 16, 2009	Catalina	CSS	·	4.9 km	MPC · JPL
325616	2009 SO_{235}	—	September 16, 2009	Kitt Peak	Spacewatch	(5)	1.6 km	MPC · JPL
325617	2009 SZ_{237}	—	September 16, 2009	Catalina	CSS	·	3.9 km	MPC · JPL
325618	2009 SX_{239}	—	September 17, 2009	Catalina	CSS	TIR	4.1 km	MPC · JPL
325619	2009 SB_{240}	—	September 17, 2009	Catalina	CSS	·	3.1 km	MPC · JPL
325620	2009 SV_{242}	—	September 29, 2009	Skylive	Tozzi, F.	·	1.8 km	MPC · JPL
325621	2009 SM_{250}	—	February 26, 2007	Mount Lemmon	Mount Lemmon Survey	AGN	1.3 km	MPC · JPL
325622	2009 SH_{254}	—	September 20, 2009	Kitt Peak	Spacewatch	·	1.8 km	MPC · JPL
325623	2009 SM_{256}	—	September 21, 2009	Mount Lemmon	Mount Lemmon Survey	·	3.0 km	MPC · JPL
325624	2009 SZ_{263}	—	September 23, 2009	Mount Lemmon	Mount Lemmon Survey	·	2.8 km	MPC · JPL
325625	2009 SN_{267}	—	September 23, 2009	Mount Lemmon	Mount Lemmon Survey	·	4.8 km	MPC · JPL
325626	2009 SF_{270}	—	September 24, 2009	Kitt Peak	Spacewatch	AGN	1.3 km	MPC · JPL
325627	2009 SO_{270}	—	September 24, 2009	Mount Lemmon	Mount Lemmon Survey	·	2.8 km	MPC · JPL
325628	2009 SA_{273}	—	September 25, 2009	Kitt Peak	Spacewatch	HYG	3.6 km	MPC · JPL
325629	2009 SL_{274}	—	September 25, 2009	Kitt Peak	Spacewatch	·	2.2 km	MPC · JPL
325630	2009 SY_{278}	—	September 25, 2009	Kitt Peak	Spacewatch	·	3.5 km	MPC · JPL
325631	2009 SP_{279}	—	September 25, 2009	Kitt Peak	Spacewatch	·	2.6 km	MPC · JPL
325632	2009 SK_{282}	—	September 25, 2009	Kitt Peak	Spacewatch	·	2.7 km	MPC · JPL
325633	2009 SU_{283}	—	September 25, 2009	Kitt Peak	Spacewatch	·	1.4 km	MPC · JPL
325634	2009 SW_{283}	—	September 25, 2009	Kitt Peak	Spacewatch	·	2.6 km	MPC · JPL
325635	2009 SB_{287}	—	September 25, 2009	Kitt Peak	Spacewatch	·	2.9 km	MPC · JPL
325636	2009 SU_{296}	—	September 28, 2009	Kitt Peak	Spacewatch	·	2.1 km	MPC · JPL
325637	2009 SX_{297}	—	September 28, 2009	Mount Lemmon	Mount Lemmon Survey	·	2.1 km	MPC · JPL
325638	2009 SE_{299}	—	September 29, 2009	Mount Lemmon	Mount Lemmon Survey	·	3.9 km	MPC · JPL
325639	2009 SE_{307}	—	September 17, 2009	Kitt Peak	Spacewatch	·	2.3 km	MPC · JPL
325640	2009 SO_{307}	—	September 17, 2009	Kitt Peak	Spacewatch	·	1.1 km	MPC · JPL
325641	2009 SW_{307}	—	September 29, 2008	Mount Lemmon	Mount Lemmon Survey	L4	8.6 km	MPC · JPL
325642	2009 SY_{315}	—	September 19, 2009	Catalina	CSS	·	3.4 km	MPC · JPL
325643	2009 SA_{318}	—	March 13, 2007	Mount Lemmon	Mount Lemmon Survey	·	2.9 km	MPC · JPL
325644	2009 SJ_{321}	—	January 28, 2006	Kitt Peak	Spacewatch	·	2.5 km	MPC · JPL
325645	2009 SR_{323}	—	September 23, 2009	Kitt Peak	Spacewatch	3:2	5.8 km	MPC · JPL
325646	2009 SL_{324}	—	December 20, 2000	Kitt Peak	Spacewatch	·	2.6 km	MPC · JPL
325647	2009 SL_{326}	—	September 29, 2009	Kitt Peak	Spacewatch	·	2.5 km	MPC · JPL
325648	2009 SM_{328}	—	September 28, 2009	Catalina	CSS	·	3.0 km	MPC · JPL
325649	2009 SL_{330}	—	September 18, 2009	Catalina	CSS	·	3.8 km	MPC · JPL
325650	2009 ST_{330}	—	September 19, 2009	Catalina	CSS	·	3.2 km	MPC · JPL
325651	2009 SV_{330}	—	September 19, 2009	Catalina	CSS	·	1.7 km	MPC · JPL
325652	2009 SM_{332}	—	September 21, 2009	Catalina	CSS	·	1.6 km	MPC · JPL
325653	2009 SN_{334}	—	September 22, 2009	Catalina	CSS	·	4.4 km	MPC · JPL
325654	2009 SM_{335}	—	February 4, 2006	Mount Lemmon	Mount Lemmon Survey	·	2.4 km	MPC · JPL
325655	2009 SB_{337}	—	September 24, 2009	Catalina	CSS	·	3.0 km	MPC · JPL
325656	2009 SX_{341}	—	September 16, 2009	Catalina	CSS	EUN	1.4 km	MPC · JPL
325657	2009 SA_{342}	—	September 16, 2009	Kitt Peak	Spacewatch	EUN	1.6 km	MPC · JPL
325658	2009 SN_{345}	—	March 26, 2007	Mount Lemmon	Mount Lemmon Survey	·	3.4 km	MPC · JPL
325659	2009 SR_{351}	—	September 21, 2009	Mount Lemmon	Mount Lemmon Survey	·	3.7 km	MPC · JPL
325660	2009 SW_{353}	—	September 21, 2009	Mount Lemmon	Mount Lemmon Survey	·	2.9 km	MPC · JPL
325661	2009 SD_{354}	—	September 18, 2009	Kitt Peak	Spacewatch	·	4.7 km	MPC · JPL
325662	2009 SQ_{356}	—	September 18, 2009	Mount Lemmon	Mount Lemmon Survey	AGN	1.3 km	MPC · JPL
325663	2009 SS_{358}	—	September 18, 2009	Catalina	CSS	·	3.3 km	MPC · JPL
325664	2009 SC_{360}	—	September 27, 2009	Socorro	LINEAR	·	5.5 km	MPC · JPL
325665	2009 SJ_{360}	—	September 28, 2009	Mount Lemmon	Mount Lemmon Survey	·	3.5 km	MPC · JPL
325666	2009 SN_{360}	—	September 29, 2009	Catalina	CSS	T_{j} (2.95)	6.4 km	MPC · JPL
325667	2009 SS_{363}	—	September 22, 2009	Kitt Peak	Spacewatch	·	2.1 km	MPC · JPL
325668	2009 SF_{364}	—	September 28, 2009	Mount Lemmon	Mount Lemmon Survey	·	3.9 km	MPC · JPL
325669	2009 TF	—	October 1, 2009	Kitt Peak	Spacewatch	EOS ·	5.1 km	MPC · JPL
325670	2009 TP_{2}	—	October 10, 2009	La Sagra	OAM	·	3.3 km	MPC · JPL
325671	2009 TU_{2}	—	October 11, 2009	Lake Tekapo	Lake Tekapo	·	1.9 km	MPC · JPL
325672	2009 TY_{4}	—	September 22, 2009	Kitt Peak	Spacewatch	·	3.9 km	MPC · JPL
325673	2009 TO_{5}	—	October 11, 2009	Mount Lemmon	Mount Lemmon Survey	(18466)	3.9 km	MPC · JPL
325674	2009 TQ_{6}	—	October 12, 2009	La Sagra	OAM	·	4.1 km	MPC · JPL
325675	2009 TZ_{8}	—	October 12, 2009	La Sagra	OAM	·	5.6 km	MPC · JPL
325676	2009 TL_{13}	—	October 15, 2009	Bisei SG Center	BATTeRS	·	2.3 km	MPC · JPL
325677	2009 TB_{16}	—	August 28, 2003	Palomar	NEAT	·	3.9 km	MPC · JPL
325678	2009 TS_{17}	—	October 2, 2009	Mount Lemmon	Mount Lemmon Survey	·	3.2 km	MPC · JPL
325679	2009 TH_{27}	—	October 1, 2009	Mount Lemmon	Mount Lemmon Survey	L4	14 km	MPC · JPL
325680	2009 TQ_{33}	—	October 9, 2009	Catalina	CSS	·	4.2 km	MPC · JPL
325681	2009 TX_{37}	—	October 13, 2009	La Sagra	OAM	·	3.6 km	MPC · JPL
325682	2009 TE_{38}	—	October 14, 2009	Catalina	CSS	·	4.5 km	MPC · JPL
325683	2009 TQ_{38}	—	October 15, 2009	La Sagra	OAM	·	2.6 km	MPC · JPL
325684	2009 TL_{39}	—	October 15, 2009	La Sagra	OAM	·	3.0 km	MPC · JPL
325685	2009 TV_{40}	—	October 2, 2009	Mount Lemmon	Mount Lemmon Survey	EOS	2.4 km	MPC · JPL
325686	2009 TN_{41}	—	October 15, 2009	Mount Lemmon	Mount Lemmon Survey	EOS	2.3 km	MPC · JPL
325687	2009 TJ_{45}	—	November 11, 2004	Kitt Peak	Spacewatch	·	4.3 km	MPC · JPL
325688	2009 TP_{46}	—	October 13, 2009	Socorro	LINEAR	·	3.9 km	MPC · JPL
325689	2009 UX_{5}	—	October 18, 2009	Catalina	CSS	HYG	3.9 km	MPC · JPL
325690	2009 UN_{13}	—	October 18, 2009	Kitt Peak	Spacewatch	CYB	4.3 km	MPC · JPL
325691	2009 UP_{15}	—	October 17, 2009	La Sagra	OAM	EOS	2.6 km	MPC · JPL
325692	2009 UL_{16}	—	October 16, 2009	Catalina	CSS	·	3.5 km	MPC · JPL
325693	2009 UB_{20}	—	October 23, 2009	Catalina	CSS	·	5.7 km	MPC · JPL
325694	2009 UA_{22}	—	October 16, 2009	Catalina	CSS	·	3.1 km	MPC · JPL
325695	2009 UF_{23}	—	October 17, 2009	La Sagra	OAM	L4	12 km	MPC · JPL
325696	2009 UA_{34}	—	October 18, 2009	Mount Lemmon	Mount Lemmon Survey	EMA	4.9 km	MPC · JPL
325697	2009 UZ_{35}	—	October 22, 2009	Mount Lemmon	Mount Lemmon Survey	·	4.3 km	MPC · JPL
325698	2009 UP_{39}	—	October 22, 2009	Mount Lemmon	Mount Lemmon Survey	·	4.7 km	MPC · JPL
325699	2009 UA_{47}	—	October 18, 2009	Mount Lemmon	Mount Lemmon Survey	·	2.2 km	MPC · JPL
325700	2009 UT_{51}	—	October 11, 2009	Mount Lemmon	Mount Lemmon Survey	3:2	5.8 km	MPC · JPL

== 325701–325800 ==
back to top

Designation			Discovery			Properties		Ref
Permanent	Provisional	Named after	Date	Site	Discoverer(s)	Category	Diam.	Ref
325701	2009 UG_{52}	—	October 22, 2009	Mount Lemmon	Mount Lemmon Survey	·	3.3 km	MPC · JPL
325702	2009 UE_{56}	—	October 23, 2009	Mount Lemmon	Mount Lemmon Survey	EOS	2.9 km	MPC · JPL
325703	2009 UL_{57}	—	October 23, 2009	Mount Lemmon	Mount Lemmon Survey	·	5.1 km	MPC · JPL
325704	2009 UZ_{68}	—	February 14, 2008	Mount Lemmon	Mount Lemmon Survey	·	1.3 km	MPC · JPL
325705	2009 UB_{72}	—	October 23, 2009	Mount Lemmon	Mount Lemmon Survey	CYB	4.9 km	MPC · JPL
325706	2009 UR_{73}	—	October 18, 2009	Mount Lemmon	Mount Lemmon Survey	·	1.9 km	MPC · JPL
325707	2009 UN_{81}	—	October 22, 2009	Mount Lemmon	Mount Lemmon Survey	·	1.6 km	MPC · JPL
325708	2009 UX_{89}	—	October 26, 2009	Bisei SG Center	BATTeRS	·	2.5 km	MPC · JPL
325709	2009 UF_{90}	—	October 22, 2009	Socorro	LINEAR	·	4.4 km	MPC · JPL
325710	2009 UL_{90}	—	October 16, 2009	Catalina	CSS	EOS	2.8 km	MPC · JPL
325711	2009 UY_{92}	—	October 24, 2009	Kitt Peak	Spacewatch	·	4.3 km	MPC · JPL
325712	2009 UK_{96}	—	October 22, 2009	Mount Lemmon	Mount Lemmon Survey	·	2.7 km	MPC · JPL
325713	2009 UO_{96}	—	October 22, 2009	Mount Lemmon	Mount Lemmon Survey	·	2.8 km	MPC · JPL
325714	2009 UQ_{99}	—	April 2, 2002	Kitt Peak	Spacewatch	·	2.6 km	MPC · JPL
325715	2009 UG_{102}	—	September 17, 2009	Kitt Peak	Spacewatch	3:2	5.5 km	MPC · JPL
325716	2009 UZ_{102}	—	October 24, 2009	Catalina	CSS	·	3.8 km	MPC · JPL
325717	2009 UA_{104}	—	October 25, 2009	Mount Lemmon	Mount Lemmon Survey	·	3.8 km	MPC · JPL
325718	2009 UL_{116}	—	October 22, 2009	Mount Lemmon	Mount Lemmon Survey	·	3.4 km	MPC · JPL
325719	2009 UU_{119}	—	October 23, 2009	Mount Lemmon	Mount Lemmon Survey	·	3.1 km	MPC · JPL
325720	2009 UV_{119}	—	October 23, 2009	Mount Lemmon	Mount Lemmon Survey	·	2.4 km	MPC · JPL
325721	2009 UT_{133}	—	October 22, 2009	Mount Lemmon	Mount Lemmon Survey	CYB	4.4 km	MPC · JPL
325722	2009 UQ_{134}	—	October 23, 2009	Mount Lemmon	Mount Lemmon Survey	·	3.0 km	MPC · JPL
325723	2009 UH_{140}	—	October 18, 2009	La Sagra	OAM	·	3.5 km	MPC · JPL
325724	2009 UC_{141}	—	October 27, 2009	Mount Lemmon	Mount Lemmon Survey	·	5.0 km	MPC · JPL
325725	2009 UG_{141}	—	January 23, 2006	Kitt Peak	Spacewatch	EOS	2.4 km	MPC · JPL
325726	2009 UM_{151}	—	October 22, 2009	Catalina	CSS	·	4.2 km	MPC · JPL
325727	2009 UN_{155}	—	March 31, 2003	Kitt Peak	Spacewatch	AGN	1.7 km	MPC · JPL
325728	2009 VS_{18}	—	August 23, 2003	Palomar	NEAT	·	2.5 km	MPC · JPL
325729	2009 VH_{29}	—	November 9, 2009	Kitt Peak	Spacewatch	HYG	3.7 km	MPC · JPL
325730	2009 VD_{40}	—	November 11, 2009	Hibiscus	Teamo, N.	·	3.7 km	MPC · JPL
325731 Maalin	2009 VF_{40}	Maalin	November 8, 2009	Catalina	CSS	·	4.9 km	MPC · JPL
325732	2009 VX_{44}	—	November 14, 2009	Mayhill	Lowe, A.	EOS	2.6 km	MPC · JPL
325733	2009 VK_{47}	—	November 9, 2009	Mount Lemmon	Mount Lemmon Survey	EOS	2.7 km	MPC · JPL
325734	2009 VH_{50}	—	November 12, 2009	La Sagra	OAM	CYB	6.8 km	MPC · JPL
325735	2009 VM_{55}	—	November 11, 2009	Kitt Peak	Spacewatch	·	4.1 km	MPC · JPL
325736	2009 VM_{72}	—	November 14, 2009	Socorro	LINEAR	(31811)	3.4 km	MPC · JPL
325737	2009 VT_{76}	—	March 14, 2007	Kitt Peak	Spacewatch	·	3.6 km	MPC · JPL
325738	2009 VF_{78}	—	November 9, 2009	Catalina	CSS	EMA	5.9 km	MPC · JPL
325739	2009 VK_{79}	—	January 9, 2006	Mount Lemmon	Mount Lemmon Survey	EOS	2.8 km	MPC · JPL
325740	2009 VD_{81}	—	October 11, 2009	Mount Lemmon	Mount Lemmon Survey	L4	10 km	MPC · JPL
325741	2009 VZ_{92}	—	November 9, 2009	Catalina	CSS	·	2.7 km	MPC · JPL
325742	2009 VH_{106}	—	November 9, 2009	Catalina	CSS	·	4.1 km	MPC · JPL
325743	2009 VT_{110}	—	November 10, 2009	Mount Lemmon	Mount Lemmon Survey	·	4.0 km	MPC · JPL
325744	2009 WE_{1}	—	November 17, 2009	Mayhill	Lowe, A.	EOS	2.5 km	MPC · JPL
325745	2009 WG_{4}	—	November 16, 2009	Kitt Peak	Spacewatch	·	4.3 km	MPC · JPL
325746	2009 WV_{12}	—	November 16, 2009	Mount Lemmon	Mount Lemmon Survey	EOS	2.3 km	MPC · JPL
325747	2009 WQ_{47}	—	November 19, 2009	Kitt Peak	Spacewatch	·	2.7 km	MPC · JPL
325748	2009 WV_{47}	—	November 19, 2009	Mount Lemmon	Mount Lemmon Survey	·	2.9 km	MPC · JPL
325749	2009 WC_{53}	—	November 22, 2009	Bisei SG Center	BATTeRS	EMA	4.9 km	MPC · JPL
325750	2009 WN_{55}	—	May 14, 2008	Mount Lemmon	Mount Lemmon Survey	·	1.7 km	MPC · JPL
325751	2009 WB_{74}	—	November 18, 2009	Kitt Peak	Spacewatch	·	4.1 km	MPC · JPL
325752	2009 WW_{87}	—	November 19, 2009	Kitt Peak	Spacewatch	EOS	2.8 km	MPC · JPL
325753	2009 WH_{90}	—	October 7, 2004	Socorro	LINEAR	·	3.4 km	MPC · JPL
325754	2009 WE_{93}	—	November 19, 2009	La Sagra	OAM	·	3.0 km	MPC · JPL
325755	2009 WU_{97}	—	November 20, 2009	La Sagra	OAM	·	4.3 km	MPC · JPL
325756	2009 WN_{114}	—	November 19, 2009	Mount Lemmon	Mount Lemmon Survey	JUN	1.6 km	MPC · JPL
325757	2009 WA_{163}	—	November 21, 2009	Kitt Peak	Spacewatch	·	2.7 km	MPC · JPL
325758	2009 WM_{190}	—	November 24, 2009	Kitt Peak	Spacewatch	·	3.3 km	MPC · JPL
325759	2009 WG_{204}	—	November 16, 2009	La Sagra	OAM	·	3.1 km	MPC · JPL
325760	2009 WN_{248}	—	November 17, 2009	Catalina	CSS	·	5.1 km	MPC · JPL
325761	2009 WH_{249}	—	September 16, 2003	Kitt Peak	Spacewatch	VER	3.0 km	MPC · JPL
325762	2010 AL_{94}	—	April 13, 2004	Kitt Peak	Spacewatch	CYB	6.3 km	MPC · JPL
325763	2010 AU_{97}	—	January 31, 2006	Kitt Peak	Spacewatch	·	6.6 km	MPC · JPL
325764	2010 AF_{105}	—	January 12, 2010	WISE	WISE	·	4.6 km	MPC · JPL
325765	2010 BJ_{7}	—	October 22, 2003	Apache Point	SDSS	·	4.8 km	MPC · JPL
325766	2010 JX_{140}	—	May 15, 2010	WISE	WISE	·	1.1 km	MPC · JPL
325767	2010 KG_{108}	—	May 29, 2010	WISE	WISE	·	1.6 km	MPC · JPL
325768	2010 LV_{14}	—	June 3, 2010	Kitt Peak	Spacewatch	·	1.9 km	MPC · JPL
325769	2010 LY_{63}	—	June 12, 2010	Siding Spring	SSS	AMO +1km	940 m	MPC · JPL
325770	2010 MO_{54}	—	June 16, 2010	WISE	WISE	·	2.6 km	MPC · JPL
325771	2010 MC_{67}	—	December 30, 2007	Kitt Peak	Spacewatch	·	2.3 km	MPC · JPL
325772	2010 NH_{10}	—	October 16, 2001	Palomar	NEAT	·	2.7 km	MPC · JPL
325773	2010 NL_{35}	—	February 9, 2008	Mount Lemmon	Mount Lemmon Survey	·	2.1 km	MPC · JPL
325774	2010 NR_{73}	—	July 15, 2010	WISE	WISE	JUN	1.7 km	MPC · JPL
325775	2010 NE_{76}	—	July 15, 2010	WISE	WISE	CLA	1.9 km	MPC · JPL
325776	2010 OV_{14}	—	January 19, 2008	Mount Lemmon	Mount Lemmon Survey	·	1.3 km	MPC · JPL
325777	2010 OE_{29}	—	January 20, 2008	Kitt Peak	Spacewatch	·	1.9 km	MPC · JPL
325778	2010 OG_{60}	—	March 12, 2008	Kitt Peak	Spacewatch	·	2.9 km	MPC · JPL
325779	2010 OT_{76}	—	October 3, 2006	Mount Lemmon	Mount Lemmon Survey	·	2.4 km	MPC · JPL
325780	2010 OC_{79}	—	February 29, 2008	Kitt Peak	Spacewatch	·	3.1 km	MPC · JPL
325781	2010 OL_{104}	—	September 1, 2005	Kitt Peak	Spacewatch	·	2.7 km	MPC · JPL
325782	2010 OV_{125}	—	January 13, 2003	Kitt Peak	Spacewatch	·	1.7 km	MPC · JPL
325783	2010 PA_{10}	—	August 4, 2010	Socorro	LINEAR	H	780 m	MPC · JPL
325784	2010 PP_{38}	—	August 6, 2010	WISE	WISE	·	1.8 km	MPC · JPL
325785	2010 PU_{46}	—	March 1, 2008	Kitt Peak	Spacewatch	·	2.7 km	MPC · JPL
325786	2010 PC_{58}	—	September 3, 1999	Kitt Peak	Spacewatch	MAS	810 m	MPC · JPL
325787	2010 PS_{58}	—	August 9, 2010	Socorro	LINEAR	·	1.3 km	MPC · JPL
325788	2010 PK_{78}	—	September 26, 2006	Kitt Peak	Spacewatch	·	2.5 km	MPC · JPL
325789	2010 QD_{1}	—	August 16, 2010	La Sagra	OAM	·	810 m	MPC · JPL
325790	2010 QX_{1}	—	July 10, 2001	Palomar	NEAT	·	3.9 km	MPC · JPL
325791	2010 RX_{4}	—	September 1, 2010	ESA OGS	ESA OGS	V	750 m	MPC · JPL
325792	2010 RO_{51}	—	September 4, 2010	Kitt Peak	Spacewatch	·	1.9 km	MPC · JPL
325793	2010 RS_{60}	—	September 6, 2010	Kitt Peak	Spacewatch	JUN	1.2 km	MPC · JPL
325794	2010 RH_{63}	—	February 8, 2008	Kitt Peak	Spacewatch	NYS	1.4 km	MPC · JPL
325795	2010 RJ_{67}	—	March 29, 2008	Catalina	CSS	ADE	2.8 km	MPC · JPL
325796	2010 RY_{68}	—	December 1, 1996	Kitt Peak	Spacewatch	·	1.3 km	MPC · JPL
325797	2010 RQ_{69}	—	September 18, 2007	Mount Lemmon	Mount Lemmon Survey	V	670 m	MPC · JPL
325798	2010 RF_{70}	—	July 16, 2007	Siding Spring	SSS	H	680 m	MPC · JPL
325799	2010 RN_{79}	—	May 22, 2001	Anderson Mesa	LONEOS	H	850 m	MPC · JPL
325800	2010 RC_{81}	—	August 24, 2000	Socorro	LINEAR	·	840 m	MPC · JPL

== 325801–325900 ==
back to top

Designation			Discovery			Properties		Ref
Permanent	Provisional	Named after	Date	Site	Discoverer(s)	Category	Diam.	Ref
325801	2010 RE_{81}	—	September 10, 2010	Catalina	CSS	·	990 m	MPC · JPL
325802	2010 RO_{81}	—	September 22, 2003	Anderson Mesa	LONEOS	·	890 m	MPC · JPL
325803	2010 RH_{93}	—	November 1, 2000	Socorro	LINEAR	·	880 m	MPC · JPL
325804	2010 RS_{100}	—	October 16, 2007	Mount Lemmon	Mount Lemmon Survey	·	650 m	MPC · JPL
325805	2010 RG_{101}	—	September 28, 2003	Kitt Peak	Spacewatch	·	1.2 km	MPC · JPL
325806	2010 RT_{103}	—	November 20, 2003	Kitt Peak	Deep Ecliptic Survey	NYS	1.1 km	MPC · JPL
325807	2010 RE_{105}	—	April 2, 2005	Mount Lemmon	Mount Lemmon Survey	·	1.2 km	MPC · JPL
325808	2010 RZ_{105}	—	November 19, 2003	Anderson Mesa	LONEOS	V	720 m	MPC · JPL
325809	2010 RY_{111}	—	April 4, 2005	Catalina	CSS	V	840 m	MPC · JPL
325810	2010 RE_{112}	—	August 29, 2006	Kitt Peak	Spacewatch	·	1.3 km	MPC · JPL
325811	2010 RG_{115}	—	September 11, 2010	Kitt Peak	Spacewatch	·	660 m	MPC · JPL
325812 Zouchenglu	2010 RT_{115}	Zouchenglu	January 3, 2008	XuYi	PMO NEO Survey Program	·	1.0 km	MPC · JPL
325813	2010 RF_{120}	—	January 7, 2003	Socorro	LINEAR	·	2.0 km	MPC · JPL
325814	2010 RK_{120}	—	February 8, 2008	Mount Lemmon	Mount Lemmon Survey	·	1.5 km	MPC · JPL
325815	2010 RS_{125}	—	September 30, 2006	Catalina	CSS	(5)	1.2 km	MPC · JPL
325816	2010 RH_{130}	—	December 16, 2006	Mount Lemmon	Mount Lemmon Survey	·	1.8 km	MPC · JPL
325817	2010 RX_{143}	—	November 1, 2007	Kitt Peak	Spacewatch	·	760 m	MPC · JPL
325818	2010 RP_{145}	—	March 24, 1998	Kitt Peak	Spacewatch	·	1.0 km	MPC · JPL
325819	2010 RF_{149}	—	March 11, 2005	Mount Lemmon	Mount Lemmon Survey	V	590 m	MPC · JPL
325820	2010 RA_{154}	—	November 18, 2006	Kitt Peak	Spacewatch	·	1.3 km	MPC · JPL
325821	2010 RM_{156}	—	March 3, 2005	Catalina	CSS	·	840 m	MPC · JPL
325822	2010 RM_{164}	—	August 28, 2003	Palomar	NEAT	·	800 m	MPC · JPL
325823	2010 RA_{171}	—	October 20, 2003	Kitt Peak	Spacewatch	·	1.1 km	MPC · JPL
325824	2010 RP_{173}	—	April 7, 2008	Mount Lemmon	Mount Lemmon Survey	·	1.6 km	MPC · JPL
325825	2010 RH_{174}	—	August 29, 2006	Kitt Peak	Spacewatch	·	1.3 km	MPC · JPL
325826	2010 RZ_{174}	—	February 3, 2008	Kitt Peak	Spacewatch	·	1.1 km	MPC · JPL
325827	2010 SL_{3}	—	February 6, 2003	Kitt Peak	Spacewatch	·	1.5 km	MPC · JPL
325828	2010 SY_{9}	—	September 26, 2000	Haleakala	NEAT	·	790 m	MPC · JPL
325829	2010 SM_{10}	—	November 5, 2007	Mount Lemmon	Mount Lemmon Survey	·	1.1 km	MPC · JPL
325830	2010 SN_{15}	—	October 10, 2007	Kitt Peak	Spacewatch	·	880 m	MPC · JPL
325831	2010 SF_{18}	—	December 6, 2007	Kitt Peak	Spacewatch	·	650 m	MPC · JPL
325832	2010 SN_{22}	—	December 3, 2002	Haleakala	NEAT	·	1.4 km	MPC · JPL
325833	2010 SU_{29}	—	August 16, 2006	Palomar	NEAT	·	1.3 km	MPC · JPL
325834	2010 SV_{29}	—	September 29, 2010	La Sagra	OAM	NYS	1.2 km	MPC · JPL
325835	2010 SK_{37}	—	March 9, 2005	Kitt Peak	Spacewatch	·	890 m	MPC · JPL
325836	2010 SP_{38}	—	October 23, 2006	Catalina	CSS	·	2.4 km	MPC · JPL
325837	2010 SC_{39}	—	September 21, 2003	Kitt Peak	Spacewatch	·	870 m	MPC · JPL
325838	2010 SJ_{40}	—	August 28, 2003	Palomar	NEAT	·	840 m	MPC · JPL
325839	2010 TX_{1}	—	May 25, 2006	Kitt Peak	Spacewatch	·	720 m	MPC · JPL
325840	2010 TJ_{14}	—	February 10, 2008	Kitt Peak	Spacewatch	·	1.2 km	MPC · JPL
325841	2010 TO_{24}	—	November 4, 1999	Socorro	LINEAR	·	1.3 km	MPC · JPL
325842	2010 TN_{25}	—	February 24, 2009	Catalina	CSS	·	1.6 km	MPC · JPL
325843	2010 TV_{27}	—	February 2, 2005	Kitt Peak	Spacewatch	·	740 m	MPC · JPL
325844	2010 TN_{30}	—	November 16, 2006	Kitt Peak	Spacewatch	·	1.6 km	MPC · JPL
325845	2010 TL_{31}	—	February 2, 2001	Kitt Peak	Spacewatch	NYS	960 m	MPC · JPL
325846	2010 TW_{32}	—	August 21, 2006	Kitt Peak	Spacewatch	·	1.3 km	MPC · JPL
325847	2010 TQ_{35}	—	March 10, 2004	Palomar	NEAT	·	1.3 km	MPC · JPL
325848	2010 TR_{37}	—	October 24, 2003	Kitt Peak	Spacewatch	V	650 m	MPC · JPL
325849	2010 TC_{38}	—	August 26, 2000	Socorro	LINEAR	·	860 m	MPC · JPL
325850	2010 TA_{50}	—	October 31, 2006	Mount Lemmon	Mount Lemmon Survey	·	1.3 km	MPC · JPL
325851	2010 TU_{52}	—	September 12, 1994	Kitt Peak	Spacewatch	·	2.2 km	MPC · JPL
325852	2010 TO_{53}	—	April 30, 2005	Kitt Peak	Spacewatch	CLA	1.5 km	MPC · JPL
325853	2010 TS_{57}	—	March 30, 2008	Kitt Peak	Spacewatch	·	1.9 km	MPC · JPL
325854	2010 TM_{79}	—	October 11, 1999	Kitt Peak	Spacewatch	V	600 m	MPC · JPL
325855	2010 TP_{82}	—	October 1, 2003	Kitt Peak	Spacewatch	·	900 m	MPC · JPL
325856	2010 TL_{84}	—	December 1, 2003	Kitt Peak	Spacewatch	V	690 m	MPC · JPL
325857	2010 TB_{85}	—	December 6, 2007	Catalina	CSS	·	1.6 km	MPC · JPL
325858	2010 TY_{85}	—	November 16, 2006	Catalina	CSS	·	1.7 km	MPC · JPL
325859	2010 TB_{86}	—	April 11, 2005	Mount Lemmon	Mount Lemmon Survey	·	970 m	MPC · JPL
325860	2010 TR_{94}	—	October 22, 1995	Kitt Peak	Spacewatch	·	1.0 km	MPC · JPL
325861	2010 TQ_{114}	—	November 25, 2005	Catalina	CSS	·	2.1 km	MPC · JPL
325862	2010 TB_{117}	—	December 4, 2007	Kitt Peak	Spacewatch	·	990 m	MPC · JPL
325863	2010 TZ_{118}	—	October 15, 2001	Kitt Peak	Spacewatch	·	2.3 km	MPC · JPL
325864	2010 TA_{119}	—	April 2, 2006	Mount Lemmon	Mount Lemmon Survey	·	750 m	MPC · JPL
325865	2010 TE_{122}	—	April 30, 2008	Mount Lemmon	Mount Lemmon Survey	·	1.6 km	MPC · JPL
325866	2010 TB_{123}	—	December 15, 2004	Kitt Peak	Spacewatch	·	750 m	MPC · JPL
325867	2010 TB_{142}	—	October 5, 2004	Anderson Mesa	LONEOS	·	3.8 km	MPC · JPL
325868	2010 TN_{147}	—	November 22, 2006	Catalina	CSS	·	1.5 km	MPC · JPL
325869	2010 TQ_{149}	—	May 11, 2007	Mount Lemmon	Mount Lemmon Survey	·	4.9 km	MPC · JPL
325870	2010 TR_{149}	—	December 11, 2006	Kitt Peak	Spacewatch	·	1.5 km	MPC · JPL
325871	2010 TA_{150}	—	April 29, 2009	Mount Lemmon	Mount Lemmon Survey	EUN	1.7 km	MPC · JPL
325872	2010 TN_{153}	—	January 5, 2006	Catalina	CSS	·	3.1 km	MPC · JPL
325873	2010 TM_{158}	—	December 13, 2006	Kitt Peak	Spacewatch	·	2.6 km	MPC · JPL
325874	2010 TG_{164}	—	March 17, 2005	Mount Lemmon	Mount Lemmon Survey	·	980 m	MPC · JPL
325875	2010 TJ_{165}	—	May 25, 2006	Mount Lemmon	Mount Lemmon Survey	MAS	780 m	MPC · JPL
325876	2010 TO_{166}	—	March 1, 2008	Kitt Peak	Spacewatch	GEF	1.5 km	MPC · JPL
325877	2010 TJ_{168}	—	September 18, 2010	Mount Lemmon	Mount Lemmon Survey	L4	10 km	MPC · JPL
325878	2010 TF_{169}	—	December 19, 2007	Mount Lemmon	Mount Lemmon Survey	(2076)	750 m	MPC · JPL
325879	2010 TK_{171}	—	March 19, 2007	Mount Lemmon	Mount Lemmon Survey	·	5.9 km	MPC · JPL
325880	2010 TT_{172}	—	December 18, 2004	Kitt Peak	Spacewatch	·	720 m	MPC · JPL
325881	2010 TZ_{175}	—	July 23, 2010	WISE	WISE	BRA	1.9 km	MPC · JPL
325882	2010 TT_{176}	—	January 10, 2003	Socorro	LINEAR	·	2.2 km	MPC · JPL
325883	2010 TO_{178}	—	November 17, 2006	Mount Lemmon	Mount Lemmon Survey	·	1.4 km	MPC · JPL
325884	2010 TA_{182}	—	October 2, 2000	Socorro	LINEAR	·	850 m	MPC · JPL
325885	2010 UO_{9}	—	November 10, 2006	Kitt Peak	Spacewatch	·	1.3 km	MPC · JPL
325886	2010 UA_{10}	—	November 1, 2006	Mount Lemmon	Mount Lemmon Survey	·	2.0 km	MPC · JPL
325887	2010 UK_{12}	—	February 21, 2003	Palomar	NEAT	·	1.9 km	MPC · JPL
325888	2010 UC_{13}	—	April 2, 2002	Kitt Peak	Spacewatch	·	990 m	MPC · JPL
325889	2010 UL_{13}	—	September 12, 2001	Socorro	LINEAR	·	1.7 km	MPC · JPL
325890	2010 UP_{14}	—	June 4, 2006	Mount Lemmon	Mount Lemmon Survey	·	740 m	MPC · JPL
325891	2010 UC_{15}	—	September 15, 2006	Kitt Peak	Spacewatch	·	1.4 km	MPC · JPL
325892	2010 UD_{16}	—	September 27, 2003	Anderson Mesa	LONEOS	·	860 m	MPC · JPL
325893	2010 UL_{26}	—	November 22, 2006	Mount Lemmon	Mount Lemmon Survey	·	2.2 km	MPC · JPL
325894	2010 UO_{27}	—	November 12, 1999	Kitt Peak	Spacewatch	·	1.2 km	MPC · JPL
325895	2010 UD_{29}	—	January 2, 2000	Kitt Peak	Spacewatch	MAS	830 m	MPC · JPL
325896	2010 UF_{29}	—	October 19, 2006	Catalina	CSS	·	1.3 km	MPC · JPL
325897	2010 UX_{30}	—	January 18, 2001	Haleakala	NEAT	·	2.2 km	MPC · JPL
325898	2010 UK_{33}	—	August 28, 2005	Kitt Peak	Spacewatch	·	1.8 km	MPC · JPL
325899	2010 UZ_{45}	—	January 28, 2007	Kitt Peak	Spacewatch	·	4.0 km	MPC · JPL
325900	2010 UJ_{54}	—	March 19, 2009	Kitt Peak	Spacewatch	·	930 m	MPC · JPL

== 325901–326000 ==
back to top

Designation			Discovery			Properties		Ref
Permanent	Provisional	Named after	Date	Site	Discoverer(s)	Category	Diam.	Ref
325901	2010 UG_{55}	—	December 18, 2001	Socorro	LINEAR	·	2.6 km	MPC · JPL
325902	2010 UU_{55}	—	September 18, 2001	Apache Point	SDSS	·	2.2 km	MPC · JPL
325903	2010 UB_{56}	—	November 14, 2007	Mount Lemmon	Mount Lemmon Survey	·	880 m	MPC · JPL
325904	2010 UG_{56}	—	October 13, 1993	Kitt Peak	Spacewatch	·	1.5 km	MPC · JPL
325905	2010 UP_{57}	—	February 21, 2007	Catalina	CSS	·	2.5 km	MPC · JPL
325906	2010 UR_{59}	—	January 27, 2007	Mount Lemmon	Mount Lemmon Survey	·	1.9 km	MPC · JPL
325907	2010 UX_{61}	—	October 22, 2006	Mount Lemmon	Mount Lemmon Survey	·	2.9 km	MPC · JPL
325908	2010 UE_{67}	—	March 26, 2007	Mount Lemmon	Mount Lemmon Survey	·	3.1 km	MPC · JPL
325909	2010 US_{73}	—	February 28, 2008	Kitt Peak	Spacewatch	(5)	1.9 km	MPC · JPL
325910	2010 UL_{74}	—	August 29, 2006	Kitt Peak	Spacewatch	·	1.6 km	MPC · JPL
325911	2010 UE_{76}	—	November 1, 2005	Kitt Peak	Spacewatch	·	3.7 km	MPC · JPL
325912	2010 UD_{77}	—	August 31, 2005	Kitt Peak	Spacewatch	·	1.9 km	MPC · JPL
325913	2010 UW_{77}	—	March 18, 2007	Kitt Peak	Spacewatch	·	1.9 km	MPC · JPL
325914	2010 UD_{80}	—	January 21, 2004	Socorro	LINEAR	·	1.6 km	MPC · JPL
325915	2010 UT_{84}	—	July 17, 2001	Haleakala	NEAT	·	1.8 km	MPC · JPL
325916	2010 UK_{90}	—	March 28, 2008	Kitt Peak	Spacewatch	WIT	1.2 km	MPC · JPL
325917	2010 UC_{94}	—	November 15, 2006	Catalina	CSS	·	1.9 km	MPC · JPL
325918	2010 UF_{94}	—	February 22, 2006	Anderson Mesa	LONEOS	·	3.3 km	MPC · JPL
325919	2010 UL_{94}	—	October 24, 2001	Palomar	NEAT	·	2.9 km	MPC · JPL
325920	2010 UM_{94}	—	March 15, 2008	Kitt Peak	Spacewatch	·	1.5 km	MPC · JPL
325921	2010 UP_{96}	—	December 13, 2006	Kitt Peak	Spacewatch	EUN	1.7 km	MPC · JPL
325922	2010 UT_{99}	—	March 11, 2005	Kitt Peak	Spacewatch	V	810 m	MPC · JPL
325923	2010 UR_{100}	—	November 10, 2005	Kitt Peak	Spacewatch	·	2.5 km	MPC · JPL
325924	2010 UE_{102}	—	November 12, 1999	Socorro	LINEAR	·	1.7 km	MPC · JPL
325925	2010 UU_{103}	—	April 22, 2009	Kitt Peak	Spacewatch	·	700 m	MPC · JPL
325926	2010 VE_{6}	—	July 27, 1995	Kitt Peak	Spacewatch	V	620 m	MPC · JPL
325927	2010 VB_{13}	—	March 29, 2008	Kitt Peak	Spacewatch	EUN	1.7 km	MPC · JPL
325928	2010 VQ_{13}	—	March 16, 2004	Palomar	NEAT	·	2.3 km	MPC · JPL
325929	2010 VB_{17}	—	December 18, 2007	Kitt Peak	Spacewatch	slow	830 m	MPC · JPL
325930	2010 VM_{17}	—	October 24, 2007	Mount Lemmon	Mount Lemmon Survey	·	1.2 km	MPC · JPL
325931	2010 VD_{18}	—	September 25, 2000	Kitt Peak	Spacewatch	·	940 m	MPC · JPL
325932	2010 VK_{20}	—	August 1, 2009	Kitt Peak	Spacewatch	·	2.2 km	MPC · JPL
325933	2010 VJ_{25}	—	October 2, 2005	Mount Lemmon	Mount Lemmon Survey	·	2.0 km	MPC · JPL
325934	2010 VE_{29}	—	September 21, 2003	Kitt Peak	Spacewatch	·	860 m	MPC · JPL
325935	2010 VJ_{29}	—	October 14, 1999	Kitt Peak	Spacewatch	TIR	2.6 km	MPC · JPL
325936	2010 VL_{31}	—	September 19, 2009	Catalina	CSS	L4	10 km	MPC · JPL
325937	2010 VF_{33}	—	September 12, 2001	Socorro	LINEAR	·	1.8 km	MPC · JPL
325938	2010 VG_{33}	—	February 11, 2002	Socorro	LINEAR	·	660 m	MPC · JPL
325939	2010 VV_{38}	—	November 26, 2003	Kitt Peak	Spacewatch	·	1.1 km	MPC · JPL
325940	2010 VF_{45}	—	August 23, 2001	Haleakala	NEAT	·	2.6 km	MPC · JPL
325941	2010 VX_{48}	—	January 2, 2006	Socorro	LINEAR	·	3.7 km	MPC · JPL
325942	2010 VK_{54}	—	February 26, 2008	Mount Lemmon	Mount Lemmon Survey	(5)	1.8 km	MPC · JPL
325943	2010 VZ_{54}	—	February 10, 2008	Mount Lemmon	Mount Lemmon Survey	·	1.5 km	MPC · JPL
325944	2010 VT_{56}	—	March 15, 2007	Mount Lemmon	Mount Lemmon Survey	·	3.1 km	MPC · JPL
325945	2010 VR_{57}	—	September 24, 2009	Mount Lemmon	Mount Lemmon Survey	L4	10 km	MPC · JPL
325946	2010 VB_{63}	—	August 20, 2006	Palomar	NEAT	ERI	1.7 km	MPC · JPL
325947	2010 VS_{67}	—	August 31, 2005	Kitt Peak	Spacewatch	·	2.2 km	MPC · JPL
325948	2010 VO_{69}	—	November 17, 2006	Kitt Peak	Spacewatch	·	1.9 km	MPC · JPL
325949	2010 VP_{79}	—	March 10, 2005	Mount Lemmon	Mount Lemmon Survey	·	980 m	MPC · JPL
325950	2010 VB_{80}	—	August 23, 2006	Palomar	NEAT	·	1.3 km	MPC · JPL
325951	2010 VC_{83}	—	December 9, 2006	Kitt Peak	Spacewatch	·	1.5 km	MPC · JPL
325952	2010 VM_{86}	—	August 17, 2009	Kitt Peak	Spacewatch	·	2.4 km	MPC · JPL
325953	2010 VJ_{90}	—	October 7, 1999	Socorro	LINEAR	·	1.1 km	MPC · JPL
325954	2010 VS_{92}	—	January 7, 2005	Kitt Peak	Spacewatch	·	720 m	MPC · JPL
325955	2010 VE_{93}	—	September 19, 2006	Catalina	CSS	PHO	1.3 km	MPC · JPL
325956	2010 VJ_{95}	—	September 1, 2005	Kitt Peak	Spacewatch	·	1.4 km	MPC · JPL
325957	2010 VO_{97}	—	April 5, 2003	Kitt Peak	Spacewatch	·	1.3 km	MPC · JPL
325958	2010 VJ_{99}	—	March 19, 2006	Siding Spring	SSS	·	5.0 km	MPC · JPL
325959	2010 VX_{101}	—	October 4, 2000	Kitt Peak	Spacewatch	·	1.8 km	MPC · JPL
325960	2010 VX_{103}	—	January 26, 2003	Haleakala	NEAT	·	2.7 km	MPC · JPL
325961	2010 VS_{105}	—	October 20, 2001	Socorro	LINEAR	·	1.7 km	MPC · JPL
325962	2010 VU_{105}	—	October 15, 2001	Kitt Peak	Spacewatch	·	1.7 km	MPC · JPL
325963	2010 VL_{108}	—	March 28, 2008	Kitt Peak	Spacewatch	·	2.1 km	MPC · JPL
325964	2010 VN_{109}	—	October 22, 2003	Apache Point	SDSS	·	860 m	MPC · JPL
325965	2010 VK_{120}	—	January 6, 2006	Catalina	CSS	·	3.9 km	MPC · JPL
325966	2010 VE_{126}	—	January 7, 2006	Kitt Peak	Spacewatch	·	3.6 km	MPC · JPL
325967	2010 VT_{126}	—	September 21, 2001	Socorro	LINEAR	·	1.5 km	MPC · JPL
325968	2010 VO_{128}	—	August 22, 2003	Campo Imperatore	CINEOS	·	940 m	MPC · JPL
325969	2010 VN_{133}	—	April 7, 2005	Kitt Peak	Spacewatch	V	850 m	MPC · JPL
325970	2010 VN_{135}	—	January 4, 2006	Kitt Peak	Spacewatch	·	2.5 km	MPC · JPL
325971	2010 VX_{143}	—	September 28, 2006	Kitt Peak	Spacewatch	·	1.1 km	MPC · JPL
325972	2010 VX_{157}	—	November 5, 2007	Kitt Peak	Spacewatch	·	1.0 km	MPC · JPL
325973 Cardinal	2010 VJ_{159}	Cardinal	August 29, 2005	Palomar	NEAT	·	2.3 km	MPC · JPL
325974	2010 VS_{160}	—	November 10, 2006	Kitt Peak	Spacewatch	(5)	1.4 km	MPC · JPL
325975	2010 VC_{162}	—	September 1, 2005	Kitt Peak	Spacewatch	HOF	2.5 km	MPC · JPL
325976	2010 VF_{162}	—	October 24, 2003	Kitt Peak	Spacewatch	·	950 m	MPC · JPL
325977	2010 VP_{162}	—	August 28, 2001	Kitt Peak	Spacewatch	·	1.4 km	MPC · JPL
325978	2010 VR_{162}	—	November 11, 2007	Mount Lemmon	Mount Lemmon Survey	·	1.3 km	MPC · JPL
325979	2010 VY_{162}	—	November 25, 2006	Kitt Peak	Spacewatch	(5)	1.4 km	MPC · JPL
325980	2010 VK_{166}	—	December 24, 2005	Kitt Peak	Spacewatch	THM	2.3 km	MPC · JPL
325981	2010 VX_{168}	—	October 6, 2005	Mount Lemmon	Mount Lemmon Survey	MRX	1.1 km	MPC · JPL
325982	2010 VX_{172}	—	March 16, 2007	Mount Lemmon	Mount Lemmon Survey	·	1.5 km	MPC · JPL
325983	2010 VF_{174}	—	April 6, 2008	Kitt Peak	Spacewatch	EUN	1.3 km	MPC · JPL
325984	2010 VB_{177}	—	April 14, 2008	Mount Lemmon	Mount Lemmon Survey	·	1.2 km	MPC · JPL
325985	2010 VK_{177}	—	May 7, 2002	Palomar	NEAT	·	860 m	MPC · JPL
325986	2010 VL_{178}	—	October 21, 2001	Kitt Peak	Spacewatch	·	1.5 km	MPC · JPL
325987	2010 VY_{178}	—	February 11, 2004	Palomar	NEAT	·	1.5 km	MPC · JPL
325988	2010 VU_{181}	—	October 22, 2005	Kitt Peak	Spacewatch	·	2.3 km	MPC · JPL
325989	2010 VE_{186}	—	July 28, 2005	Palomar	NEAT	·	2.1 km	MPC · JPL
325990	2010 VQ_{188}	—	October 7, 2004	Anderson Mesa	LONEOS	HYG	3.2 km	MPC · JPL
325991	2010 VM_{191}	—	October 5, 2004	Three Buttes	Jones, G. R.	EOS	2.5 km	MPC · JPL
325992	2010 VX_{192}	—	November 3, 2004	Palomar	NEAT	T_{j} (2.98) · EUP	4.0 km	MPC · JPL
325993	2010 VJ_{195}	—	January 19, 2008	Mount Lemmon	Mount Lemmon Survey	HNS	1.5 km	MPC · JPL
325994	2010 VT_{195}	—	October 4, 1996	Kitt Peak	Spacewatch	·	2.5 km	MPC · JPL
325995	2010 VO_{200}	—	January 5, 2003	Socorro	LINEAR	·	2.3 km	MPC · JPL
325996	2010 WH_{2}	—	October 17, 2006	Mount Lemmon	Mount Lemmon Survey	·	1.7 km	MPC · JPL
325997	2010 WK_{3}	—	April 6, 2008	Catalina	CSS	EUN	1.3 km	MPC · JPL
325998	2010 WE_{5}	—	August 30, 2000	Kitt Peak	Spacewatch	HOF	2.8 km	MPC · JPL
325999	2010 WN_{7}	—	November 18, 2006	Kitt Peak	Spacewatch	·	2.3 km	MPC · JPL
326000	2010 WN_{8}	—	July 24, 2003	Palomar	NEAT	·	2.9 km	MPC · JPL

back to top

== See also ==
- Meanings of minor-planet names: 325001–326000
