= Meanings of minor-planet names: 325001–326000 =

As minor planet discoveries are confirmed, they are given a permanent number by the IAU's Minor Planet Center (MPC), and the discoverers can then submit names for them, following the IAU's naming conventions. The list below concerns those minor planets in the specified number-range that have received names, and explains the meanings of those names.

Official naming citations of newly named small Solar System bodies are approved and published in a bulletin by IAU's Working Group for Small Bodies Nomenclature (WGSBN). Before May 2021, citations were published in MPC's Minor Planet Circulars for many decades. Recent citations can also be found on the JPL Small-Body Database (SBDB). Until his death in 2016, German astronomer Lutz D. Schmadel compiled these citations into the Dictionary of Minor Planet Names (DMP) and regularly updated the collection.

Based on Paul Herget's The Names of the Minor Planets, Schmadel also researched the unclear origin of numerous asteroids, most of which had been named prior to World War II. This article incorporates text from this source, which is in the public domain: SBDB New namings may only be added to this list below after official publication as the preannouncement of names is condemned. The WGSBN publishes a comprehensive guideline for the naming rules of non-cometary small Solar System bodies.

== 325001–325100 ==
Named minor planet	Provisional	This minor planet was named for...	Ref · Catalog
There are no named minor planets in this number range

== 325101–325200 ==
back to top

Named minor planet	Provisional	This minor planet was named for...	Ref · Catalog
325136 Zhongnanshan	2008 ED_{149}	Zhong Nanshan (born 1936), an academician of the Chinese Academy of Engineering, is both the main advocate of early prevention, diagnosis and management of chronic airway diseases, and an important contributor in combating major public health emergencies (such as SARS and COVID-19) in China.	IAU · 325136

== 325201–325300 ==
back to top

Named minor planet	Provisional	This minor planet was named for...	Ref · Catalog
There are no named minor planets in this number range

== 325301–325400 ==
back to top

Named minor planet	Provisional	This minor planet was named for...	Ref · Catalog
325366 Asturias	2008 QN_{16}	The Principality of Asturias, an autonomous community located in the north-western part of Spain	JPL · 325366
325368 Ihorhuk	2008 QK_{24}	Ihor Huk (born 1952), a professor of surgery at the Medical University of Vienna, and a foreign member of the National Academy of Sciences of Ukraine.	JPL · 325368
325369 Shishilov	2008 QJ_{29}	Shishilov Viktor Fedorovich (born 1939), who developed tourism in Russia, specifically in Suzdal, Vladimir Oblas.	JPL · 325369
325372 Irynadyachuk	2008 RS_{22}	Iryna Dmytrivna Dyachuk (b. 1964) is a Ukrainian philosopher, museum specialist, and science popularizer.	IAU · 325372

== 325401–325500 ==
back to top

Named minor planet	Provisional	This minor planet was named for...	Ref · Catalog
325436 Khlebov	2009 OJ_{23}	Khlebov Aleksandr Veniaminovich (born 1966), head of the Observatory and the astronomical club DD(U)T (Izhevsk, Russia) between 1987 and 2003	JPL · 325436
325455 Della Valle	2009 QJ_{26}	Massimo Della Valle (born 1957), an Italian astronomer	JPL · 325455
325462 Felanitx	2009 QR_{47}	Felanitx is a town in the east of Mallorca.	JPL · 325462
325476 Carlomarchioro	2009 RY	Carlo Marchioro, Italian mathematical physicist.	IAU · 325476

== 325501–325600 ==
back to top

Named minor planet	Provisional	This minor planet was named for...	Ref · Catalog
325558 Guyane	2009 SP_{101}	Guyane, the official name for French Guiana, an overseas region of France on the North Atlantic coast of South America.	JPL · 325558
325588 Bridzius	2009 SS_{148}	Audrius Bridzius (born 1966), President of Lithuanian Astronomical Union (2007–2011), is Senior Researcher at the Astronomical Observatory of Vilnius University. He is an expert in stellar photometry and extragalactic astronomy. He is an organizer of the National and International Astronomy Olympiads for school students	JPL · 325588

== 325601–325700 ==
back to top

Named minor planet	Provisional	This minor planet was named for...	Ref · Catalog
There are no named minor planets in this number range

== 325701–325800 ==
back to top

Named minor planet	Provisional	This minor planet was named for...	Ref · Catalog
325731 Maalin	2009 VF_{40}	Description available (see ref). Please summarize in your own words.	IAU · 325731

== 325801–325900 ==
back to top

Named minor planet	Provisional	This minor planet was named for...	Ref · Catalog
325812 Zouchenglu	2010 RT_{115}	Chen-Lu Tsou (1923–2006), an academician of the Chinese Academy of Sciences, was a founder and pioneer of biochemistry in China. He made significant contributions to the development of biochemistry research. (Alternative spellings of his name include Zou Chenglu and Chenglu Zou.)	JPL · 325812

== 325901–326000 ==
back to top

Named minor planet	Provisional	This minor planet was named for...	Ref · Catalog
325973 Cardinal	2010 VJ_{159}	Robert Damian Cardinal (born 1969), a research associate at the University of Calgary	JPL · 325973

back to top

Preceded by 324,001–325,000	Meanings of minor-planet names List of minor planets: 325,001–326,000	Succeeded by 326,001–327,000
