= List of minor planets: 324001–325000 =

The following is a partial list of minor planets, running from minor-planet number 324001 through 325000, inclusive. The primary data for this and other partial lists is based on JPL's "Small-Body Orbital Elements" and data available from the Minor Planet Center. Critical list information is also provided by the MPC, unless otherwise specified from Lowell Observatory. A detailed description of the table's columns and additional sources are given on the main page including a complete list of every page in this series, and a statistical break-up on the dynamical classification of minor planets.

Also see the summary list of all named bodies in numerical and alphabetical order, and the corresponding naming citations for the number range of this particular list. New namings may only be added to this list after official publication, as the preannouncement of names is condemned by the Working Group for Small Bodies Nomenclature of the International Astronomical Union.

Near-Earth obj.	MBA (inner)	MBA (outer)	Centaur
Mars-crosser	MBA (middle)	Jupiter trojan	Trans-Neptunian obj.
Unclassified

== 324001–324100 ==
Designation			Discovery			Properties		Ref
Permanent	Provisional	Named after	Date	Site	Discoverer(s)	Category	Diam.	Ref
324001	2005 UB_{274}	—	October 24, 2005	Palomar	NEAT	·	2.4 km	MPC · JPL
324002	2005 UL_{288}	—	October 26, 2005	Kitt Peak	Spacewatch	·	2.2 km	MPC · JPL
324003	2005 UV_{288}	—	October 26, 2005	Kitt Peak	Spacewatch	·	2.2 km	MPC · JPL
324004	2005 UL_{290}	—	October 26, 2005	Kitt Peak	Spacewatch	·	2.2 km	MPC · JPL
324005	2005 UU_{291}	—	October 26, 2005	Kitt Peak	Spacewatch	·	2.0 km	MPC · JPL
324006	2005 UK_{296}	—	October 26, 2005	Kitt Peak	Spacewatch	·	2.8 km	MPC · JPL
324007	2005 UL_{299}	—	October 26, 2005	Kitt Peak	Spacewatch	·	2.2 km	MPC · JPL
324008	2005 UG_{302}	—	October 26, 2005	Kitt Peak	Spacewatch	·	5.4 km	MPC · JPL
324009	2005 UO_{303}	—	October 26, 2005	Kitt Peak	Spacewatch	·	1.5 km	MPC · JPL
324010	2005 UB_{309}	—	October 28, 2005	Mount Lemmon	Mount Lemmon Survey	·	2.5 km	MPC · JPL
324011	2005 UV_{309}	—	October 28, 2005	Mount Lemmon	Mount Lemmon Survey	·	2.9 km	MPC · JPL
324012	2005 UO_{312}	—	October 29, 2005	Catalina	CSS	ADE	2.1 km	MPC · JPL
324013	2005 UO_{313}	—	October 27, 2005	Socorro	LINEAR	·	2.0 km	MPC · JPL
324014	2005 UZ_{324}	—	October 29, 2005	Mount Lemmon	Mount Lemmon Survey	GEF	1.3 km	MPC · JPL
324015	2005 UW_{330}	—	October 28, 2005	Mount Lemmon	Mount Lemmon Survey	KOR	1.5 km	MPC · JPL
324016	2005 UV_{348}	—	October 23, 2005	Palomar	NEAT	MAR	1.8 km	MPC · JPL
324017	2005 UT_{349}	—	October 27, 2005	Socorro	LINEAR	·	2.7 km	MPC · JPL
324018	2005 UE_{352}	—	October 29, 2005	Catalina	CSS	ADE	2.6 km	MPC · JPL
324019	2005 UW_{368}	—	October 27, 2005	Kitt Peak	Spacewatch	KOR	1.4 km	MPC · JPL
324020	2005 UF_{376}	—	October 27, 2005	Kitt Peak	Spacewatch	·	2.2 km	MPC · JPL
324021	2005 UB_{378}	—	October 28, 2005	Mount Lemmon	Mount Lemmon Survey	·	1.7 km	MPC · JPL
324022	2005 UH_{381}	—	October 29, 2005	Mount Lemmon	Mount Lemmon Survey	·	2.1 km	MPC · JPL
324023	2005 UO_{383}	—	October 27, 2005	Kitt Peak	Spacewatch	·	1.6 km	MPC · JPL
324024	2005 UV_{389}	—	October 29, 2005	Mount Lemmon	Mount Lemmon Survey	·	2.3 km	MPC · JPL
324025	2005 UB_{402}	—	October 27, 2005	Mount Lemmon	Mount Lemmon Survey	KOR	1.5 km	MPC · JPL
324026	2005 UB_{405}	—	October 29, 2005	Mount Lemmon	Mount Lemmon Survey	THM	1.9 km	MPC · JPL
324027	2005 UF_{414}	—	October 25, 2005	Kitt Peak	Spacewatch	KOR	1.3 km	MPC · JPL
324028	2005 UM_{422}	—	October 27, 2005	Mount Lemmon	Mount Lemmon Survey	·	2.9 km	MPC · JPL
324029	2005 UY_{428}	—	October 28, 2005	Mount Lemmon	Mount Lemmon Survey	EUN	930 m	MPC · JPL
324030	2005 UJ_{432}	—	October 28, 2005	Kitt Peak	Spacewatch	KOR	1.4 km	MPC · JPL
324031	2005 UN_{436}	—	October 31, 2005	Kitt Peak	Spacewatch	·	2.0 km	MPC · JPL
324032	2005 UW_{438}	—	October 28, 2005	Socorro	LINEAR	·	2.2 km	MPC · JPL
324033	2005 UD_{440}	—	October 29, 2005	Catalina	CSS	·	2.4 km	MPC · JPL
324034	2005 UA_{442}	—	October 29, 2005	Catalina	CSS	·	2.2 km	MPC · JPL
324035	2005 US_{442}	—	October 30, 2005	Kitt Peak	Spacewatch	AGN	1.4 km	MPC · JPL
324036	2005 UZ_{446}	—	October 29, 2005	Catalina	CSS	·	2.2 km	MPC · JPL
324037	2005 UN_{455}	—	October 29, 2005	Catalina	CSS	·	2.7 km	MPC · JPL
324038	2005 UM_{479}	—	October 29, 2005	Mount Lemmon	Mount Lemmon Survey	HOF	2.5 km	MPC · JPL
324039	2005 UE_{480}	—	October 30, 2005	Catalina	CSS	H	600 m	MPC · JPL
324040	2005 UX_{481}	—	October 20, 2005	Palomar	NEAT	·	2.8 km	MPC · JPL
324041	2005 UK_{495}	—	October 26, 2005	Anderson Mesa	LONEOS	ADE	2.7 km	MPC · JPL
324042	2005 UZ_{495}	—	October 26, 2005	Anderson Mesa	LONEOS	·	3.0 km	MPC · JPL
324043	2005 UZ_{511}	—	October 28, 2005	Mount Lemmon	Mount Lemmon Survey	·	1.7 km	MPC · JPL
324044	2005 US_{516}	—	October 25, 2005	Apache Point	A. C. Becker	·	1.3 km	MPC · JPL
324045	2005 UO_{525}	—	October 25, 2005	Kitt Peak	Spacewatch	AGN	1.5 km	MPC · JPL
324046	2005 UJ_{527}	—	October 27, 2005	Mount Lemmon	Mount Lemmon Survey	·	3.0 km	MPC · JPL
324047	2005 VZ	—	November 3, 2005	Socorro	LINEAR	H	720 m	MPC · JPL
324048	2005 VR_{2}	—	November 1, 2005	Kitt Peak	Spacewatch	BRA	1.8 km	MPC · JPL
324049	2005 VA_{26}	—	November 3, 2005	Kitt Peak	Spacewatch	·	2.0 km	MPC · JPL
324050	2005 VB_{28}	—	November 4, 2005	Kitt Peak	Spacewatch	AGN	1.2 km	MPC · JPL
324051	2005 VZ_{29}	—	November 4, 2005	Kitt Peak	Spacewatch	KOR	1.5 km	MPC · JPL
324052	2005 VD_{31}	—	November 4, 2005	Kitt Peak	Spacewatch	HOF	3.4 km	MPC · JPL
324053	2005 VS_{42}	—	November 4, 2005	Catalina	CSS	·	2.2 km	MPC · JPL
324054	2005 VA_{53}	—	November 3, 2005	Mount Lemmon	Mount Lemmon Survey	MRX	1.3 km	MPC · JPL
324055	2005 VZ_{53}	—	October 25, 2005	Kitt Peak	Spacewatch	·	2.0 km	MPC · JPL
324056	2005 VU_{56}	—	November 4, 2005	Kitt Peak	Spacewatch	MAR	1.5 km	MPC · JPL
324057	2005 VG_{58}	—	November 5, 2005	Kitt Peak	Spacewatch	·	2.3 km	MPC · JPL
324058	2005 VH_{59}	—	November 5, 2005	Kitt Peak	Spacewatch	HNS	1.6 km	MPC · JPL
324059	2005 VX_{60}	—	November 5, 2005	Kitt Peak	Spacewatch	·	1.6 km	MPC · JPL
324060	2005 VC_{61}	—	November 5, 2005	Catalina	CSS	·	1.8 km	MPC · JPL
324061	2005 VM_{61}	—	November 5, 2005	Catalina	CSS	H	700 m	MPC · JPL
324062	2005 VF_{63}	—	November 1, 2005	Mount Lemmon	Mount Lemmon Survey	·	1.8 km	MPC · JPL
324063	2005 VK_{66}	—	November 1, 2005	Mount Lemmon	Mount Lemmon Survey	EUN	1.3 km	MPC · JPL
324064	2005 VT_{77}	—	November 6, 2005	Kitt Peak	Spacewatch	·	2.2 km	MPC · JPL
324065	2005 VB_{87}	—	November 6, 2005	Kitt Peak	Spacewatch	·	2.3 km	MPC · JPL
324066	2005 VL_{97}	—	November 5, 2005	Kitt Peak	Spacewatch	·	2.0 km	MPC · JPL
324067	2005 VM_{97}	—	November 5, 2005	Kitt Peak	Spacewatch	·	2.2 km	MPC · JPL
324068	2005 VY_{123}	—	November 12, 2005	Kitt Peak	Spacewatch	·	2.3 km	MPC · JPL
324069	2005 VC_{124}	—	November 5, 2005	Catalina	CSS	·	3.4 km	MPC · JPL
324070	2005 WK_{1}	—	November 21, 2005	Socorro	LINEAR	T_{j} (2.99)	3.8 km	MPC · JPL
324071	2005 WA_{26}	—	October 30, 2005	Mount Lemmon	Mount Lemmon Survey	·	2.1 km	MPC · JPL
324072	2005 WL_{26}	—	November 21, 2005	Kitt Peak	Spacewatch	·	1.9 km	MPC · JPL
324073	2005 WA_{27}	—	November 21, 2005	Kitt Peak	Spacewatch	·	2.1 km	MPC · JPL
324074	2005 WX_{30}	—	November 21, 2005	Kitt Peak	Spacewatch	MRX	1.4 km	MPC · JPL
324075	2005 WH_{43}	—	November 21, 2005	Kitt Peak	Spacewatch	EOS	2.9 km	MPC · JPL
324076	2005 WR_{49}	—	November 25, 2005	Mount Lemmon	Mount Lemmon Survey	KOR	1.2 km	MPC · JPL
324077	2005 WU_{58}	—	November 30, 2005	Socorro	LINEAR	·	3.8 km	MPC · JPL
324078	2005 WZ_{67}	—	November 22, 2005	Kitt Peak	Spacewatch	·	2.4 km	MPC · JPL
324079	2005 WD_{75}	—	November 25, 2005	Kitt Peak	Spacewatch	AGN	1.3 km	MPC · JPL
324080	2005 WP_{75}	—	November 25, 2005	Kitt Peak	Spacewatch	·	1.8 km	MPC · JPL
324081	2005 WL_{87}	—	November 28, 2005	Mount Lemmon	Mount Lemmon Survey	·	2.8 km	MPC · JPL
324082	2005 WJ_{90}	—	November 28, 2005	Socorro	LINEAR	BRA	2.3 km	MPC · JPL
324083	2005 WW_{94}	—	November 26, 2005	Kitt Peak	Spacewatch	·	2.6 km	MPC · JPL
324084	2005 WY_{100}	—	November 22, 2005	Kitt Peak	Spacewatch	·	1.9 km	MPC · JPL
324085	2005 WJ_{102}	—	November 29, 2005	Mount Lemmon	Mount Lemmon Survey	KOR	1.7 km	MPC · JPL
324086	2005 WU_{102}	—	November 25, 2005	Catalina	CSS	·	2.8 km	MPC · JPL
324087	2005 WS_{114}	—	November 28, 2005	Catalina	CSS	·	2.0 km	MPC · JPL
324088	2005 WJ_{121}	—	November 30, 2005	Mount Lemmon	Mount Lemmon Survey	·	2.6 km	MPC · JPL
324089	2005 WC_{122}	—	November 30, 2005	Mount Lemmon	Mount Lemmon Survey	(5)	1.9 km	MPC · JPL
324090	2005 WR_{123}	—	November 25, 2005	Mount Lemmon	Mount Lemmon Survey	·	1.8 km	MPC · JPL
324091	2005 WQ_{125}	—	November 25, 2005	Mount Lemmon	Mount Lemmon Survey	·	1.6 km	MPC · JPL
324092	2005 WX_{140}	—	November 26, 2005	Mount Lemmon	Mount Lemmon Survey	·	3.2 km	MPC · JPL
324093	2005 WB_{142}	—	November 29, 2005	Kitt Peak	Spacewatch	·	2.0 km	MPC · JPL
324094	2005 WY_{144}	—	November 25, 2005	Kitt Peak	Spacewatch	·	1.3 km	MPC · JPL
324095	2005 WB_{153}	—	November 29, 2005	Kitt Peak	Spacewatch	·	2.6 km	MPC · JPL
324096	2005 WT_{153}	—	November 29, 2005	Palomar	NEAT	·	2.7 km	MPC · JPL
324097	2005 WX_{162}	—	November 28, 2005	Mount Lemmon	Mount Lemmon Survey	·	4.1 km	MPC · JPL
324098	2005 WJ_{164}	—	November 29, 2005	Mount Lemmon	Mount Lemmon Survey	KOR	1.2 km	MPC · JPL
324099	2005 WR_{187}	—	November 29, 2005	Catalina	CSS	·	2.5 km	MPC · JPL
324100	2005 WD_{195}	—	November 30, 2005	Socorro	LINEAR	·	3.2 km	MPC · JPL

== 324101–324200 ==
back to top

Designation			Discovery			Properties		Ref
Permanent	Provisional	Named after	Date	Site	Discoverer(s)	Category	Diam.	Ref
324101	2005 WA_{203}	—	November 30, 2005	Kitt Peak	Spacewatch	·	3.0 km	MPC · JPL
324102	2005 XJ_{12}	—	December 1, 2005	Kitt Peak	Spacewatch	·	2.2 km	MPC · JPL
324103	2005 XK_{20}	—	December 2, 2005	Kitt Peak	Spacewatch	·	2.3 km	MPC · JPL
324104	2005 XD_{23}	—	December 2, 2005	Mount Lemmon	Mount Lemmon Survey	·	2.0 km	MPC · JPL
324105	2005 XE_{30}	—	December 1, 2005	Mount Lemmon	Mount Lemmon Survey	·	2.9 km	MPC · JPL
324106	2005 XB_{51}	—	December 2, 2005	Kitt Peak	Spacewatch	·	3.4 km	MPC · JPL
324107	2005 XE_{52}	—	December 2, 2005	Kitt Peak	Spacewatch	·	2.4 km	MPC · JPL
324108	2005 XS_{57}	—	December 1, 2005	Mount Lemmon	Mount Lemmon Survey	KOR	1.4 km	MPC · JPL
324109	2005 XL_{68}	—	December 6, 2005	Kitt Peak	Spacewatch	·	2.1 km	MPC · JPL
324110	2005 XX_{73}	—	December 6, 2005	Kitt Peak	Spacewatch	·	4.2 km	MPC · JPL
324111	2005 XO_{77}	—	December 2, 2005	Mount Lemmon	Mount Lemmon Survey	·	2.5 km	MPC · JPL
324112	2005 XF_{84}	—	December 7, 2005	Catalina	CSS	AEG	4.0 km	MPC · JPL
324113	2005 XX_{89}	—	December 8, 2005	Kitt Peak	Spacewatch	·	1.7 km	MPC · JPL
324114	2005 XU_{109}	—	December 1, 2005	Kitt Peak	M. W. Buie	EOS	3.0 km	MPC · JPL
324115	2005 XL_{116}	—	December 5, 2005	Kitt Peak	Spacewatch	·	2.8 km	MPC · JPL
324116	2005 YU_{7}	—	December 22, 2005	Kitt Peak	Spacewatch	·	2.1 km	MPC · JPL
324117	2005 YN_{14}	—	December 22, 2005	Kitt Peak	Spacewatch	·	3.5 km	MPC · JPL
324118	2005 YO_{16}	—	December 22, 2005	Kitt Peak	Spacewatch	·	2.8 km	MPC · JPL
324119	2005 YG_{17}	—	December 23, 2005	Kitt Peak	Spacewatch	KOR	1.3 km	MPC · JPL
324120	2005 YP_{18}	—	December 23, 2005	Kitt Peak	Spacewatch	·	1.5 km	MPC · JPL
324121	2005 YT_{18}	—	December 23, 2005	Kitt Peak	Spacewatch	KOR	1.3 km	MPC · JPL
324122	2005 YE_{30}	—	December 25, 2005	Kitt Peak	Spacewatch	·	2.2 km	MPC · JPL
324123	2005 YF_{31}	—	December 22, 2005	Kitt Peak	Spacewatch	·	3.6 km	MPC · JPL
324124	2005 YC_{32}	—	December 22, 2005	Kitt Peak	Spacewatch	·	2.7 km	MPC · JPL
324125	2005 YD_{33}	—	November 1, 2005	Mount Lemmon	Mount Lemmon Survey	·	3.2 km	MPC · JPL
324126	2005 YR_{38}	—	December 22, 2005	Catalina	CSS	·	2.5 km	MPC · JPL
324127	2005 YY_{39}	—	December 22, 2005	Kitt Peak	Spacewatch	·	1.9 km	MPC · JPL
324128	2005 YY_{46}	—	December 25, 2005	Kitt Peak	Spacewatch	·	2.6 km	MPC · JPL
324129	2005 YX_{52}	—	September 30, 2005	Mount Lemmon	Mount Lemmon Survey	EOS	2.6 km	MPC · JPL
324130	2005 YL_{54}	—	December 25, 2005	Kitt Peak	Spacewatch	EOS	2.5 km	MPC · JPL
324131	2005 YA_{55}	—	December 25, 2005	Kitt Peak	Spacewatch	·	2.7 km	MPC · JPL
324132	2005 YY_{55}	—	December 21, 2005	Kitt Peak	Spacewatch	·	2.1 km	MPC · JPL
324133	2005 YA_{60}	—	December 22, 2005	Kitt Peak	Spacewatch	EUP	4.7 km	MPC · JPL
324134	2005 YQ_{65}	—	December 25, 2005	Kitt Peak	Spacewatch	·	2.1 km	MPC · JPL
324135	2005 YZ_{66}	—	December 25, 2005	Kitt Peak	Spacewatch	·	3.2 km	MPC · JPL
324136	2005 YD_{85}	—	December 25, 2005	Mount Lemmon	Mount Lemmon Survey	·	2.0 km	MPC · JPL
324137	2005 YH_{86}	—	December 2, 2005	Mount Lemmon	Mount Lemmon Survey	·	2.8 km	MPC · JPL
324138	2005 YM_{86}	—	November 1, 2005	Mount Lemmon	Mount Lemmon Survey	·	2.7 km	MPC · JPL
324139	2005 YY_{87}	—	December 25, 2005	Mount Lemmon	Mount Lemmon Survey	·	2.4 km	MPC · JPL
324140	2005 YX_{89}	—	December 26, 2005	Mount Lemmon	Mount Lemmon Survey	·	2.0 km	MPC · JPL
324141	2005 YR_{91}	—	December 26, 2005	Mount Lemmon	Mount Lemmon Survey	·	2.9 km	MPC · JPL
324142	2005 YF_{92}	—	December 27, 2005	Mount Lemmon	Mount Lemmon Survey	·	2.0 km	MPC · JPL
324143	2005 YE_{112}	—	December 25, 2005	Mount Lemmon	Mount Lemmon Survey	·	2.6 km	MPC · JPL
324144	2005 YH_{117}	—	December 25, 2005	Kitt Peak	Spacewatch	·	4.1 km	MPC · JPL
324145	2005 YZ_{123}	—	December 25, 2005	Kitt Peak	Spacewatch	·	3.6 km	MPC · JPL
324146	2005 YP_{125}	—	December 26, 2005	Kitt Peak	Spacewatch	TEL	1.4 km	MPC · JPL
324147	2005 YP_{142}	—	December 28, 2005	Mount Lemmon	Mount Lemmon Survey	·	1.9 km	MPC · JPL
324148	2005 YY_{152}	—	October 27, 2005	Mount Lemmon	Mount Lemmon Survey	NAE	3.4 km	MPC · JPL
324149	2005 YL_{153}	—	December 29, 2005	Catalina	CSS	·	3.9 km	MPC · JPL
324150	2005 YU_{162}	—	December 27, 2005	Mount Lemmon	Mount Lemmon Survey	EOS	2.3 km	MPC · JPL
324151	2005 YG_{167}	—	December 27, 2005	Kitt Peak	Spacewatch	EOS	2.4 km	MPC · JPL
324152	2005 YH_{168}	—	December 29, 2005	Kitt Peak	Spacewatch	H	800 m	MPC · JPL
324153	2005 YV_{168}	—	December 29, 2005	Palomar	NEAT	·	4.4 km	MPC · JPL
324154	2005 YN_{176}	—	December 22, 2005	Kitt Peak	Spacewatch	·	2.5 km	MPC · JPL
324155	2005 YE_{177}	—	December 22, 2005	Kitt Peak	Spacewatch	·	3.5 km	MPC · JPL
324156	2005 YZ_{178}	—	December 25, 2005	Mount Lemmon	Mount Lemmon Survey	EOS	1.8 km	MPC · JPL
324157	2005 YC_{190}	—	December 30, 2005	Kitt Peak	Spacewatch	EOS	2.1 km	MPC · JPL
324158	2005 YY_{192}	—	December 30, 2005	Kitt Peak	Spacewatch	·	2.9 km	MPC · JPL
324159	2005 YF_{199}	—	December 25, 2005	Mount Lemmon	Mount Lemmon Survey	EOS	3.0 km	MPC · JPL
324160	2005 YO_{201}	—	December 24, 2005	Kitt Peak	Spacewatch	·	3.0 km	MPC · JPL
324161	2005 YH_{205}	—	November 30, 2005	Mount Lemmon	Mount Lemmon Survey	EOS	2.4 km	MPC · JPL
324162	2005 YV_{210}	—	December 24, 2005	Catalina	CSS	·	4.1 km	MPC · JPL
324163	2005 YP_{251}	—	December 28, 2005	Kitt Peak	Spacewatch	·	4.0 km	MPC · JPL
324164	2005 YZ_{255}	—	December 30, 2005	Kitt Peak	Spacewatch	KOR	1.7 km	MPC · JPL
324165	2005 YT_{264}	—	December 25, 2005	Kitt Peak	Spacewatch	·	2.1 km	MPC · JPL
324166	2005 YS_{268}	—	December 25, 2005	Kitt Peak	Spacewatch	·	2.1 km	MPC · JPL
324167	2005 YM_{270}	—	December 27, 2005	Mount Lemmon	Mount Lemmon Survey	·	2.3 km	MPC · JPL
324168	2005 YD_{278}	—	December 25, 2005	Mount Lemmon	Mount Lemmon Survey	·	2.6 km	MPC · JPL
324169	2005 YK_{283}	—	December 27, 2005	Kitt Peak	Spacewatch	·	2.9 km	MPC · JPL
324170	2005 YS_{284}	—	December 28, 2005	Kitt Peak	Spacewatch	·	1.9 km	MPC · JPL
324171	2006 AJ	—	January 2, 2006	Socorro	LINEAR	·	3.4 km	MPC · JPL
324172	2006 AC_{4}	—	December 29, 2005	Palomar	NEAT	·	3.1 km	MPC · JPL
324173	2006 AM_{7}	—	January 5, 2006	Catalina	CSS	·	4.0 km	MPC · JPL
324174	2006 AX_{10}	—	December 28, 2005	Kitt Peak	Spacewatch	·	2.6 km	MPC · JPL
324175	2006 AU_{14}	—	January 5, 2006	Mount Lemmon	Mount Lemmon Survey	EOS	2.3 km	MPC · JPL
324176	2006 AN_{20}	—	January 5, 2006	Catalina	CSS	EUP	4.8 km	MPC · JPL
324177	2006 AV_{25}	—	January 5, 2006	Kitt Peak	Spacewatch	·	2.7 km	MPC · JPL
324178	2006 AD_{26}	—	December 1, 2005	Mount Lemmon	Mount Lemmon Survey	HYG	2.6 km	MPC · JPL
324179	2006 AA_{27}	—	January 5, 2006	Kitt Peak	Spacewatch	THM	1.9 km	MPC · JPL
324180	2006 AX_{34}	—	January 4, 2006	Mount Lemmon	Mount Lemmon Survey	·	2.8 km	MPC · JPL
324181	2006 AC_{35}	—	January 4, 2006	Kitt Peak	Spacewatch	·	2.8 km	MPC · JPL
324182	2006 AX_{36}	—	January 4, 2006	Kitt Peak	Spacewatch	·	3.7 km	MPC · JPL
324183	2006 AU_{37}	—	January 4, 2006	Kitt Peak	Spacewatch	·	3.3 km	MPC · JPL
324184	2006 AT_{41}	—	January 5, 2006	Kitt Peak	Spacewatch	·	3.4 km	MPC · JPL
324185	2006 AT_{48}	—	December 24, 2005	Kitt Peak	Spacewatch	·	2.6 km	MPC · JPL
324186	2006 AS_{49}	—	January 5, 2006	Kitt Peak	Spacewatch	·	2.4 km	MPC · JPL
324187	2006 AU_{58}	—	January 4, 2006	Kitt Peak	Spacewatch	KOR	1.6 km	MPC · JPL
324188	2006 AJ_{61}	—	January 5, 2006	Kitt Peak	Spacewatch	·	2.9 km	MPC · JPL
324189	2006 AV_{62}	—	December 25, 2005	Kitt Peak	Spacewatch	·	2.5 km	MPC · JPL
324190	2006 AN_{63}	—	January 6, 2006	Mount Lemmon	Mount Lemmon Survey	·	2.3 km	MPC · JPL
324191	2006 AX_{65}	—	January 8, 2006	Kitt Peak	Spacewatch	·	3.0 km	MPC · JPL
324192	2006 AZ_{66}	—	January 9, 2006	Kitt Peak	Spacewatch	·	3.0 km	MPC · JPL
324193	2006 AJ_{67}	—	January 9, 2006	Kitt Peak	Spacewatch	·	1.8 km	MPC · JPL
324194	2006 AN_{68}	—	January 5, 2006	Mount Lemmon	Mount Lemmon Survey	·	2.4 km	MPC · JPL
324195	2006 AW_{68}	—	October 25, 1995	Kitt Peak	Spacewatch	·	2.2 km	MPC · JPL
324196	2006 AN_{70}	—	January 6, 2006	Kitt Peak	Spacewatch	·	3.5 km	MPC · JPL
324197	2006 AG_{72}	—	January 6, 2006	Mount Lemmon	Mount Lemmon Survey	·	2.6 km	MPC · JPL
324198	2006 AL_{73}	—	January 8, 2006	Mount Lemmon	Mount Lemmon Survey	·	2.0 km	MPC · JPL
324199	2006 AE_{78}	—	January 8, 2006	Mount Lemmon	Mount Lemmon Survey	·	3.8 km	MPC · JPL
324200	2006 AV_{79}	—	January 6, 2006	Anderson Mesa	LONEOS	T_{j} (2.99) · EUP	5.0 km	MPC · JPL

== 324201–324300 ==
back to top

Designation			Discovery			Properties		Ref
Permanent	Provisional	Named after	Date	Site	Discoverer(s)	Category	Diam.	Ref
324201	2006 AB_{81}	—	January 9, 2006	Kitt Peak	Spacewatch	EOS	2.1 km	MPC · JPL
324202	2006 AF_{85}	—	January 6, 2006	Catalina	CSS	·	4.6 km	MPC · JPL
324203	2006 AE_{89}	—	January 5, 2006	Mount Lemmon	Mount Lemmon Survey	·	3.3 km	MPC · JPL
324204	2006 AT_{91}	—	January 7, 2006	Mount Lemmon	Mount Lemmon Survey	·	2.6 km	MPC · JPL
324205	2006 AC_{96}	—	January 12, 2006	Palomar	NEAT	·	4.5 km	MPC · JPL
324206	2006 AW_{97}	—	January 6, 2006	Catalina	CSS	·	4.7 km	MPC · JPL
324207	2006 AO_{102}	—	January 7, 2006	Mount Lemmon	Mount Lemmon Survey	·	3.2 km	MPC · JPL
324208	2006 AS_{103}	—	January 7, 2006	Mauna Kea	P. A. Wiegert	EOS	1.7 km	MPC · JPL
324209	2006 BQ_{2}	—	January 20, 2006	Catalina	CSS	·	5.6 km	MPC · JPL
324210	2006 BN_{10}	—	January 20, 2006	Kitt Peak	Spacewatch	EOS	2.6 km	MPC · JPL
324211	2006 BJ_{19}	—	January 22, 2006	Mount Lemmon	Mount Lemmon Survey	THM	2.1 km	MPC · JPL
324212	2006 BY_{23}	—	January 23, 2006	Catalina	CSS	LIX	4.8 km	MPC · JPL
324213	2006 BR_{27}	—	January 22, 2006	Mount Lemmon	Mount Lemmon Survey	KOR	1.8 km	MPC · JPL
324214	2006 BC_{31}	—	January 20, 2006	Kitt Peak	Spacewatch	HYG	3.5 km	MPC · JPL
324215	2006 BH_{33}	—	January 21, 2006	Kitt Peak	Spacewatch	·	5.1 km	MPC · JPL
324216	2006 BM_{33}	—	January 21, 2006	Kitt Peak	Spacewatch	·	3.8 km	MPC · JPL
324217	2006 BF_{39}	—	January 24, 2006	Mount Nyukasa	Japan Aerospace Exploration Agency	·	3.7 km	MPC · JPL
324218	2006 BO_{41}	—	January 22, 2006	Mount Lemmon	Mount Lemmon Survey	·	5.1 km	MPC · JPL
324219	2006 BA_{44}	—	January 23, 2006	Kitt Peak	Spacewatch	·	5.2 km	MPC · JPL
324220	2006 BP_{51}	—	January 25, 2006	Kitt Peak	Spacewatch	·	2.4 km	MPC · JPL
324221	2006 BM_{56}	—	January 22, 2006	Catalina	CSS	·	3.1 km	MPC · JPL
324222	2006 BK_{60}	—	January 26, 2006	Kitt Peak	Spacewatch	·	3.1 km	MPC · JPL
324223	2006 BG_{61}	—	January 22, 2006	Catalina	CSS	·	4.9 km	MPC · JPL
324224	2006 BV_{68}	—	January 23, 2006	Kitt Peak	Spacewatch	·	3.4 km	MPC · JPL
324225	2006 BB_{71}	—	January 23, 2006	Kitt Peak	Spacewatch	·	4.2 km	MPC · JPL
324226	2006 BW_{78}	—	January 23, 2006	Kitt Peak	Spacewatch	THM	2.6 km	MPC · JPL
324227	2006 BE_{93}	—	January 26, 2006	Kitt Peak	Spacewatch	·	2.9 km	MPC · JPL
324228	2006 BR_{100}	—	January 29, 2006	Marly	Observatoire Naef	·	5.0 km	MPC · JPL
324229	2006 BY_{100}	—	January 23, 2006	Kitt Peak	Spacewatch	·	3.2 km	MPC · JPL
324230	2006 BH_{108}	—	January 25, 2006	Kitt Peak	Spacewatch	THM	2.5 km	MPC · JPL
324231	2006 BA_{111}	—	January 25, 2006	Kitt Peak	Spacewatch	EOS	2.6 km	MPC · JPL
324232	2006 BO_{113}	—	January 25, 2006	Kitt Peak	Spacewatch	·	2.7 km	MPC · JPL
324233	2006 BQ_{115}	—	January 26, 2006	Kitt Peak	Spacewatch	·	3.6 km	MPC · JPL
324234	2006 BH_{119}	—	January 26, 2006	Kitt Peak	Spacewatch	·	2.6 km	MPC · JPL
324235	2006 BH_{121}	—	January 26, 2006	Kitt Peak	Spacewatch	·	3.2 km	MPC · JPL
324236	2006 BP_{121}	—	January 26, 2006	Mount Lemmon	Mount Lemmon Survey	·	3.4 km	MPC · JPL
324237	2006 BJ_{128}	—	January 26, 2006	Kitt Peak	Spacewatch	L5	9.1 km	MPC · JPL
324238	2006 BG_{131}	—	January 26, 2006	Kitt Peak	Spacewatch	·	3.8 km	MPC · JPL
324239	2006 BB_{135}	—	January 27, 2006	Mount Lemmon	Mount Lemmon Survey	·	3.8 km	MPC · JPL
324240	2006 BZ_{153}	—	January 25, 2006	Anderson Mesa	LONEOS	·	3.6 km	MPC · JPL
324241	2006 BJ_{155}	—	January 25, 2006	Kitt Peak	Spacewatch	·	4.0 km	MPC · JPL
324242	2006 BA_{161}	—	January 26, 2006	Kitt Peak	Spacewatch	·	3.8 km	MPC · JPL
324243	2006 BC_{162}	—	January 26, 2006	Catalina	CSS	EUP	6.0 km	MPC · JPL
324244	2006 BJ_{162}	—	October 7, 2005	Mauna Kea	A. Boattini	·	2.8 km	MPC · JPL
324245	2006 BR_{164}	—	January 26, 2006	Kitt Peak	Spacewatch	·	3.8 km	MPC · JPL
324246	2006 BJ_{169}	—	January 26, 2006	Mount Lemmon	Mount Lemmon Survey	·	3.9 km	MPC · JPL
324247	2006 BW_{169}	—	January 26, 2006	Kitt Peak	Spacewatch	·	3.2 km	MPC · JPL
324248	2006 BD_{172}	—	January 27, 2006	Kitt Peak	Spacewatch	·	2.5 km	MPC · JPL
324249	2006 BG_{177}	—	January 27, 2006	Kitt Peak	Spacewatch	·	3.3 km	MPC · JPL
324250	2006 BX_{181}	—	January 27, 2006	Mount Lemmon	Mount Lemmon Survey	·	2.8 km	MPC · JPL
324251	2006 BC_{184}	—	January 28, 2006	Mount Lemmon	Mount Lemmon Survey	·	2.7 km	MPC · JPL
324252	2006 BT_{184}	—	January 28, 2006	Mount Lemmon	Mount Lemmon Survey	·	4.8 km	MPC · JPL
324253	2006 BM_{185}	—	January 28, 2006	Mount Lemmon	Mount Lemmon Survey	EOS	2.3 km	MPC · JPL
324254	2006 BE_{189}	—	January 28, 2006	Kitt Peak	Spacewatch	HYG	3.2 km	MPC · JPL
324255	2006 BQ_{203}	—	January 31, 2006	Kitt Peak	Spacewatch	·	4.0 km	MPC · JPL
324256	2006 BZ_{210}	—	January 31, 2006	Catalina	CSS	·	3.8 km	MPC · JPL
324257	2006 BH_{211}	—	January 31, 2006	Kitt Peak	Spacewatch	·	3.1 km	MPC · JPL
324258	2006 BH_{212}	—	January 31, 2006	Kitt Peak	Spacewatch	·	3.3 km	MPC · JPL
324259	2006 BZ_{214}	—	January 24, 2006	Anderson Mesa	LONEOS	·	4.1 km	MPC · JPL
324260	2006 BT_{217}	—	January 29, 2006	Catalina	CSS	·	4.5 km	MPC · JPL
324261	2006 BQ_{226}	—	January 30, 2006	Catalina	CSS	·	4.3 km	MPC · JPL
324262	2006 BV_{226}	—	January 30, 2006	Kitt Peak	Spacewatch	LIX	3.2 km	MPC · JPL
324263	2006 BN_{232}	—	January 31, 2006	Kitt Peak	Spacewatch	EOS	2.5 km	MPC · JPL
324264	2006 BN_{239}	—	February 4, 1995	Kitt Peak	Spacewatch	·	2.5 km	MPC · JPL
324265	2006 BO_{243}	—	March 29, 2001	Kitt Peak	Spacewatch	·	2.6 km	MPC · JPL
324266	2006 BR_{262}	—	January 31, 2006	Kitt Peak	Spacewatch	·	2.7 km	MPC · JPL
324267	2006 BC_{265}	—	January 31, 2006	Kitt Peak	Spacewatch	HYG	2.5 km	MPC · JPL
324268	2006 BM_{274}	—	January 30, 2006	Kitt Peak	Spacewatch	·	3.8 km	MPC · JPL
324269	2006 BT_{274}	—	January 23, 2006	Kitt Peak	Spacewatch	THM	2.1 km	MPC · JPL
324270	2006 BB_{275}	—	January 26, 2006	Mount Lemmon	Mount Lemmon Survey	HYG	2.8 km	MPC · JPL
324271	2006 BG_{278}	—	January 22, 2006	Mount Lemmon	Mount Lemmon Survey	·	2.5 km	MPC · JPL
324272	2006 BV_{278}	—	January 25, 2006	Kitt Peak	Spacewatch	VER	2.9 km	MPC · JPL
324273	2006 BS_{283}	—	January 22, 2006	Mount Lemmon	Mount Lemmon Survey	EOS	2.4 km	MPC · JPL
324274	2006 CT_{2}	—	January 23, 2006	Mount Lemmon	Mount Lemmon Survey	THM	2.6 km	MPC · JPL
324275	2006 CH_{10}	—	February 4, 2006	Wrightwood	J. W. Young	TEL	2.1 km	MPC · JPL
324276	2006 CF_{12}	—	February 1, 2006	Kitt Peak	Spacewatch	·	3.0 km	MPC · JPL
324277	2006 CA_{26}	—	February 2, 2006	Kitt Peak	Spacewatch	(31811)	4.0 km	MPC · JPL
324278	2006 CQ_{37}	—	February 2, 2006	Mount Lemmon	Mount Lemmon Survey	·	3.9 km	MPC · JPL
324279	2006 CE_{39}	—	February 2, 2006	Kitt Peak	Spacewatch	·	4.0 km	MPC · JPL
324280	2006 CE_{45}	—	February 3, 2006	Kitt Peak	Spacewatch	·	2.3 km	MPC · JPL
324281	2006 CV_{48}	—	February 3, 2006	Kitt Peak	Spacewatch	VER	3.3 km	MPC · JPL
324282	2006 CU_{49}	—	February 3, 2006	Socorro	LINEAR	·	4.6 km	MPC · JPL
324283	2006 CM_{54}	—	February 4, 2006	Mount Lemmon	Mount Lemmon Survey	THM	2.4 km	MPC · JPL
324284	2006 CJ_{59}	—	February 6, 2006	Kitt Peak	Spacewatch	EMA	4.1 km	MPC · JPL
324285	2006 CG_{61}	—	March 21, 2001	Anderson Mesa	LONEOS	·	4.0 km	MPC · JPL
324286	2006 CA_{62}	—	December 7, 2005	Catalina	CSS	·	4.6 km	MPC · JPL
324287	2006 DO	—	February 20, 2006	Vicques	M. Ory	EOS	2.4 km	MPC · JPL
324288	2006 DV_{9}	—	February 21, 2006	Catalina	CSS	TIR	4.5 km	MPC · JPL
324289	2006 DE_{15}	—	February 20, 2006	Kitt Peak	Spacewatch	·	3.0 km	MPC · JPL
324290	2006 DG_{15}	—	February 20, 2006	Kitt Peak	Spacewatch	·	3.7 km	MPC · JPL
324291	2006 DV_{26}	—	February 20, 2006	Kitt Peak	Spacewatch	·	3.6 km	MPC · JPL
324292	2006 DK_{41}	—	February 23, 2006	Anderson Mesa	LONEOS	·	4.9 km	MPC · JPL
324293	2006 DV_{45}	—	February 20, 2006	Kitt Peak	Spacewatch	VER	3.0 km	MPC · JPL
324294	2006 DY_{46}	—	February 20, 2006	Mount Lemmon	Mount Lemmon Survey	·	3.5 km	MPC · JPL
324295	2006 DT_{55}	—	February 24, 2006	Mount Lemmon	Mount Lemmon Survey	·	5.4 km	MPC · JPL
324296	2006 DL_{56}	—	February 24, 2006	Mount Lemmon	Mount Lemmon Survey	·	3.7 km	MPC · JPL
324297	2006 DA_{57}	—	February 24, 2006	Mount Lemmon	Mount Lemmon Survey	·	3.9 km	MPC · JPL
324298	2006 DC_{71}	—	February 21, 2006	Kitt Peak	Spacewatch	·	3.5 km	MPC · JPL
324299	2006 DC_{77}	—	February 24, 2006	Kitt Peak	Spacewatch	·	5.3 km	MPC · JPL
324300	2006 DR_{84}	—	February 24, 2006	Kitt Peak	Spacewatch	·	3.2 km	MPC · JPL

== 324301–324400 ==
back to top

Designation			Discovery			Properties		Ref
Permanent	Provisional	Named after	Date	Site	Discoverer(s)	Category	Diam.	Ref
324301	2006 DG_{98}	—	February 25, 2006	Kitt Peak	Spacewatch	·	3.0 km	MPC · JPL
324302	2006 DT_{101}	—	February 25, 2006	Kitt Peak	Spacewatch	·	3.4 km	MPC · JPL
324303	2006 DK_{111}	—	February 27, 2006	Kitt Peak	Spacewatch	·	3.5 km	MPC · JPL
324304	2006 DP_{118}	—	February 28, 2006	Mount Lemmon	Mount Lemmon Survey	·	3.9 km	MPC · JPL
324305	2006 DL_{123}	—	February 24, 2006	Mount Lemmon	Mount Lemmon Survey	·	3.8 km	MPC · JPL
324306	2006 DD_{132}	—	February 25, 2006	Kitt Peak	Spacewatch	·	3.1 km	MPC · JPL
324307	2006 DR_{141}	—	March 26, 1995	Kitt Peak	Spacewatch	·	3.2 km	MPC · JPL
324308	2006 DG_{153}	—	February 25, 2006	Mount Lemmon	Mount Lemmon Survey	·	3.8 km	MPC · JPL
324309	2006 DV_{181}	—	February 27, 2006	Kitt Peak	Spacewatch	TIR	4.0 km	MPC · JPL
324310	2006 DQ_{184}	—	February 27, 2006	Mount Lemmon	Mount Lemmon Survey	·	4.3 km	MPC · JPL
324311	2006 DR_{187}	—	February 27, 2006	Kitt Peak	Spacewatch	·	3.3 km	MPC · JPL
324312	2006 DZ_{190}	—	February 27, 2006	Kitt Peak	Spacewatch	·	3.4 km	MPC · JPL
324313	2006 DA_{195}	—	February 28, 2006	Mount Lemmon	Mount Lemmon Survey	·	2.4 km	MPC · JPL
324314	2006 DF_{196}	—	February 22, 2006	Catalina	CSS	·	3.1 km	MPC · JPL
324315	2006 DR_{198}	—	February 27, 2006	Catalina	CSS	·	4.6 km	MPC · JPL
324316	2006 DZ_{199}	—	February 24, 2006	Anderson Mesa	LONEOS	EUP	4.6 km	MPC · JPL
324317	2006 EP_{52}	—	March 5, 2006	Kitt Peak	Spacewatch	·	4.0 km	MPC · JPL
324318	2006 FY_{11}	—	March 23, 2006	Kitt Peak	Spacewatch	·	3.5 km	MPC · JPL
324319	2006 GG_{20}	—	April 2, 2006	Kitt Peak	Spacewatch	·	570 m	MPC · JPL
324320	2006 GS_{48}	—	April 9, 2006	Kitt Peak	Spacewatch	·	5.0 km	MPC · JPL
324321	2006 HS_{50}	—	April 26, 2006	Mount Lemmon	Mount Lemmon Survey	·	4.7 km	MPC · JPL
324322	2006 HB_{62}	—	April 24, 2006	Kitt Peak	Spacewatch	·	1.1 km	MPC · JPL
324323	2006 HL_{90}	—	April 26, 2006	Kitt Peak	Spacewatch	·	920 m	MPC · JPL
324324	2006 HP_{92}	—	April 29, 2006	Kitt Peak	Spacewatch	·	850 m	MPC · JPL
324325	2006 HZ_{144}	—	April 27, 2006	Cerro Tololo	M. W. Buie	·	1.0 km	MPC · JPL
324326	2006 HL_{147}	—	April 27, 2006	Cerro Tololo	M. W. Buie	·	720 m	MPC · JPL
324327	2006 JB_{72}	—	May 1, 2006	Mauna Kea	P. A. Wiegert	CYB	4.3 km	MPC · JPL
324328	2006 KM_{61}	—	May 22, 2006	Kitt Peak	Spacewatch	·	810 m	MPC · JPL
324329	2006 KU_{71}	—	May 22, 2006	Kitt Peak	Spacewatch	·	770 m	MPC · JPL
324330	2006 OG_{1}	—	July 18, 2006	Lulin	LUSS	·	810 m	MPC · JPL
324331	2006 OE_{12}	—	July 21, 2006	Catalina	CSS	·	730 m	MPC · JPL
324332	2006 OR_{12}	—	July 18, 2006	Siding Spring	SSS	·	1.2 km	MPC · JPL
324333	2006 OW_{16}	—	July 21, 2006	Mount Lemmon	Mount Lemmon Survey	·	1.2 km	MPC · JPL
324334	2006 PO	—	August 5, 2006	Pla D'Arguines	R. Ferrando	·	660 m	MPC · JPL
324335	2006 PG_{5}	—	August 12, 2006	Palomar	NEAT	·	860 m	MPC · JPL
324336	2006 PC_{11}	—	August 13, 2006	Palomar	NEAT	·	860 m	MPC · JPL
324337	2006 PV_{13}	—	August 14, 2006	Siding Spring	SSS	·	970 m	MPC · JPL
324338	2006 PZ_{14}	—	August 15, 2006	Palomar	NEAT	NYS	1.4 km	MPC · JPL
324339	2006 PO_{16}	—	August 19, 2006	Kitt Peak	Spacewatch	V	780 m	MPC · JPL
324340	2006 PB_{21}	—	August 15, 2006	Palomar	NEAT	·	660 m	MPC · JPL
324341	2006 PN_{26}	—	August 15, 2006	Palomar	NEAT	·	960 m	MPC · JPL
324342	2006 PB_{27}	—	August 15, 2006	Palomar	NEAT	·	1.5 km	MPC · JPL
324343	2006 QV_{2}	—	August 17, 2006	Palomar	NEAT	V	630 m	MPC · JPL
324344	2006 QH_{10}	—	August 19, 2006	Reedy Creek	J. Broughton	·	1.2 km	MPC · JPL
324345	2006 QZ_{11}	—	August 16, 2006	Siding Spring	SSS	·	860 m	MPC · JPL
324346	2006 QQ_{16}	—	August 17, 2006	Palomar	NEAT	V	670 m	MPC · JPL
324347	2006 QR_{18}	—	August 17, 2006	Palomar	NEAT	(2076)	880 m	MPC · JPL
324348	2006 QW_{24}	—	August 17, 2006	Palomar	NEAT	·	1.2 km	MPC · JPL
324349	2006 QQ_{31}	—	August 17, 2006	Palomar	NEAT	V	760 m	MPC · JPL
324350	2006 QZ_{33}	—	August 24, 2006	Pla D'Arguines	R. Ferrando	·	870 m	MPC · JPL
324351	2006 QY_{35}	—	August 17, 2006	Palomar	NEAT	·	960 m	MPC · JPL
324352	2006 QC_{38}	—	August 16, 2006	Siding Spring	SSS	·	1.1 km	MPC · JPL
324353	2006 QR_{55}	—	August 22, 2006	Palomar	NEAT	NYS	990 m	MPC · JPL
324354	2006 QJ_{57}	—	August 25, 2006	Mayhill	Lowe, A.	V	870 m	MPC · JPL
324355	2006 QA_{61}	—	August 21, 2006	Socorro	LINEAR	·	900 m	MPC · JPL
324356	2006 QU_{80}	—	August 24, 2006	Socorro	LINEAR	·	1.7 km	MPC · JPL
324357	2006 QB_{81}	—	August 24, 2006	Palomar	NEAT	·	740 m	MPC · JPL
324358	2006 QB_{100}	—	August 24, 2006	Socorro	LINEAR	·	920 m	MPC · JPL
324359	2006 QL_{106}	—	August 28, 2006	Catalina	CSS	V	750 m	MPC · JPL
324360	2006 QG_{108}	—	August 28, 2006	Catalina	CSS	·	1.3 km	MPC · JPL
324361	2006 QV_{114}	—	August 27, 2006	Anderson Mesa	LONEOS	·	1.8 km	MPC · JPL
324362	2006 QE_{116}	—	August 27, 2006	Anderson Mesa	LONEOS	·	1.1 km	MPC · JPL
324363	2006 QF_{116}	—	August 27, 2006	Anderson Mesa	LONEOS	·	810 m	MPC · JPL
324364	2006 QO_{121}	—	August 29, 2006	Catalina	CSS	·	990 m	MPC · JPL
324365	2006 QD_{129}	—	August 17, 2006	Palomar	NEAT	·	1.2 km	MPC · JPL
324366	2006 QC_{134}	—	August 24, 2006	Socorro	LINEAR	·	1.4 km	MPC · JPL
324367	2006 QY_{139}	—	August 18, 2006	Palomar	NEAT	·	830 m	MPC · JPL
324368	2006 QZ_{165}	—	August 29, 2006	Catalina	CSS	·	1.0 km	MPC · JPL
324369	2006 QF_{166}	—	August 29, 2006	Catalina	CSS	·	1.0 km	MPC · JPL
324370	2006 QV_{167}	—	August 30, 2006	Anderson Mesa	LONEOS	·	780 m	MPC · JPL
324371	2006 QH_{183}	—	August 28, 2006	Anderson Mesa	LONEOS	·	850 m	MPC · JPL
324372	2006 RW_{2}	—	September 12, 2006	Socorro	LINEAR	·	740 m	MPC · JPL
324373	2006 RA_{4}	—	September 12, 2006	Catalina	CSS	·	1.3 km	MPC · JPL
324374	2006 RE_{9}	—	September 12, 2006	Catalina	CSS	·	1.2 km	MPC · JPL
324375	2006 RN_{11}	—	September 12, 2006	Catalina	CSS	NYS	1.3 km	MPC · JPL
324376	2006 RY_{17}	—	September 14, 2006	Palomar	NEAT	·	1.5 km	MPC · JPL
324377	2006 RZ_{27}	—	September 14, 2006	Catalina	CSS	·	4.0 km	MPC · JPL
324378	2006 RO_{33}	—	September 11, 2006	Catalina	CSS	·	740 m	MPC · JPL
324379	2006 RY_{35}	—	September 14, 2006	Catalina	CSS	·	1.7 km	MPC · JPL
324380	2006 RW_{37}	—	September 12, 2006	Catalina	CSS	·	1.7 km	MPC · JPL
324381	2006 RB_{53}	—	September 14, 2006	Kitt Peak	Spacewatch	·	1.7 km	MPC · JPL
324382	2006 RH_{59}	—	September 15, 2006	Kitt Peak	Spacewatch	·	1.3 km	MPC · JPL
324383	2006 RS_{78}	—	September 15, 2006	Kitt Peak	Spacewatch	·	750 m	MPC · JPL
324384	2006 RJ_{88}	—	September 15, 2006	Kitt Peak	Spacewatch	·	830 m	MPC · JPL
324385	2006 RN_{90}	—	September 15, 2006	Kitt Peak	Spacewatch	V	710 m	MPC · JPL
324386	2006 RL_{95}	—	September 15, 2006	Kitt Peak	Spacewatch	(2076)	1.1 km	MPC · JPL
324387	2006 RR_{96}	—	September 15, 2006	Kitt Peak	Spacewatch	·	2.0 km	MPC · JPL
324388	2006 RH_{112}	—	September 14, 2006	Mauna Kea	Masiero, J.	NYS	1.0 km	MPC · JPL
324389	2006 SV_{3}	—	September 16, 2006	Catalina	CSS	·	1.7 km	MPC · JPL
324390	2006 SM_{18}	—	September 17, 2006	Kitt Peak	Spacewatch	NYS	1.3 km	MPC · JPL
324391	2006 SD_{21}	—	September 16, 2006	Anderson Mesa	LONEOS	·	990 m	MPC · JPL
324392	2006 SO_{22}	—	September 17, 2006	Anderson Mesa	LONEOS	·	820 m	MPC · JPL
324393	2006 SD_{31}	—	September 17, 2006	Kitt Peak	Spacewatch	·	840 m	MPC · JPL
324394	2006 SH_{36}	—	September 17, 2006	Anderson Mesa	LONEOS	·	1.5 km	MPC · JPL
324395	2006 SB_{43}	—	September 18, 2006	Kitt Peak	Spacewatch	ERI	1.8 km	MPC · JPL
324396	2006 SR_{53}	—	September 16, 2006	Catalina	CSS	·	1.7 km	MPC · JPL
324397	2006 SP_{55}	—	September 18, 2006	Catalina	CSS	·	1.7 km	MPC · JPL
324398	2006 SX_{88}	—	September 18, 2006	Kitt Peak	Spacewatch	·	870 m	MPC · JPL
324399	2006 SU_{91}	—	September 18, 2006	Kitt Peak	Spacewatch	·	1.3 km	MPC · JPL
324400	2006 SQ_{108}	—	September 19, 2006	Kitt Peak	Spacewatch	CLA	1.8 km	MPC · JPL

== 324401–324500 ==
back to top

Designation			Discovery			Properties		Ref
Permanent	Provisional	Named after	Date	Site	Discoverer(s)	Category	Diam.	Ref
324401	2006 SZ_{122}	—	September 19, 2006	Catalina	CSS	V	840 m	MPC · JPL
324402	2006 SM_{150}	—	September 19, 2006	Kitt Peak	Spacewatch	·	1.1 km	MPC · JPL
324403	2006 SM_{151}	—	September 19, 2006	Kitt Peak	Spacewatch	·	1.0 km	MPC · JPL
324404	2006 SE_{155}	—	September 22, 2006	Socorro	LINEAR	·	1.5 km	MPC · JPL
324405	2006 ST_{160}	—	September 23, 2006	Kitt Peak	Spacewatch	PHO	2.7 km	MPC · JPL
324406	2006 SP_{185}	—	September 25, 2006	Kitt Peak	Spacewatch	·	1.4 km	MPC · JPL
324407	2006 SB_{197}	—	September 26, 2006	Mount Lemmon	Mount Lemmon Survey	MAR	1.1 km	MPC · JPL
324408	2006 SH_{200}	—	September 24, 2006	Kitt Peak	Spacewatch	·	1.0 km	MPC · JPL
324409	2006 SE_{202}	—	September 24, 2006	Kitt Peak	Spacewatch	V	840 m	MPC · JPL
324410	2006 SY_{216}	—	September 27, 2006	Kitt Peak	Spacewatch	·	1.4 km	MPC · JPL
324411	2006 SE_{217}	—	September 28, 2006	Vail-Jarnac	Jarnac	·	1.2 km	MPC · JPL
324412	2006 SL_{219}	—	March 8, 2005	Mount Lemmon	Mount Lemmon Survey	·	850 m	MPC · JPL
324413	2006 SH_{242}	—	September 26, 2006	Kitt Peak	Spacewatch	MAS	880 m	MPC · JPL
324414	2006 SM_{247}	—	September 26, 2006	Mount Lemmon	Mount Lemmon Survey	·	810 m	MPC · JPL
324415	2006 ST_{265}	—	September 26, 2006	Kitt Peak	Spacewatch	·	1.2 km	MPC · JPL
324416	2006 SN_{280}	—	September 29, 2006	Anderson Mesa	LONEOS	·	1.3 km	MPC · JPL
324417 Kaišiadorys	2006 SS_{290}	Kaišiadorys	September 27, 2006	Moletai	K. Černis, J. Zdanavičius	NYS	1.6 km	MPC · JPL
324418	2006 SX_{305}	—	September 27, 2006	Kitt Peak	Spacewatch	·	950 m	MPC · JPL
324419	2006 SE_{307}	—	September 27, 2006	Kitt Peak	Spacewatch	PHO	1.2 km	MPC · JPL
324420	2006 SD_{315}	—	September 27, 2006	Kitt Peak	Spacewatch	V	870 m	MPC · JPL
324421	2006 SM_{320}	—	September 27, 2006	Kitt Peak	Spacewatch	BRG	1.5 km	MPC · JPL
324422	2006 SN_{320}	—	September 27, 2006	Kitt Peak	Spacewatch	·	1.5 km	MPC · JPL
324423	2006 SD_{323}	—	September 27, 2006	Kitt Peak	Spacewatch	CLA	1.5 km	MPC · JPL
324424	2006 SC_{325}	—	September 27, 2006	Kitt Peak	Spacewatch	·	870 m	MPC · JPL
324425	2006 SZ_{350}	—	September 30, 2006	Catalina	CSS	·	1.3 km	MPC · JPL
324426	2006 SX_{354}	—	September 30, 2006	Mount Lemmon	Mount Lemmon Survey	·	1.2 km	MPC · JPL
324427	2006 SR_{358}	—	September 30, 2006	Catalina	CSS	·	1.2 km	MPC · JPL
324428	2006 SD_{360}	—	September 30, 2006	Mount Lemmon	Mount Lemmon Survey	·	1.5 km	MPC · JPL
324429	2006 SF_{372}	—	September 18, 2006	Catalina	CSS	EUN	1.4 km	MPC · JPL
324430	2006 SL_{393}	—	September 28, 2006	Mount Lemmon	Mount Lemmon Survey	V	780 m	MPC · JPL
324431	2006 SY_{403}	—	September 30, 2006	Mount Lemmon	Mount Lemmon Survey	·	1.1 km	MPC · JPL
324432	2006 SL_{408}	—	September 30, 2006	Mount Lemmon	Mount Lemmon Survey	·	1.2 km	MPC · JPL
324433	2006 SP_{408}	—	September 30, 2006	Mount Lemmon	Mount Lemmon Survey	·	1.3 km	MPC · JPL
324434	2006 ST_{409}	—	September 19, 2006	Kitt Peak	Spacewatch	V	680 m	MPC · JPL
324435	2006 TA_{2}	—	October 1, 2006	Kitt Peak	Spacewatch	NYS	1.2 km	MPC · JPL
324436	2006 TO_{8}	—	October 4, 2006	Mount Lemmon	Mount Lemmon Survey	·	900 m	MPC · JPL
324437	2006 TX_{21}	—	October 11, 2006	Kitt Peak	Spacewatch	·	1.8 km	MPC · JPL
324438	2006 TP_{29}	—	October 12, 2006	Kitt Peak	Spacewatch	·	1.3 km	MPC · JPL
324439	2006 TU_{30}	—	October 12, 2006	Kitt Peak	Spacewatch	·	940 m	MPC · JPL
324440	2006 TU_{33}	—	September 26, 2006	Mount Lemmon	Mount Lemmon Survey	·	1.4 km	MPC · JPL
324441	2006 TB_{38}	—	October 12, 2006	Kitt Peak	Spacewatch	·	1.1 km	MPC · JPL
324442	2006 TY_{50}	—	October 12, 2006	Kitt Peak	Spacewatch	(5)	1.3 km	MPC · JPL
324443	2006 TJ_{54}	—	October 12, 2006	Palomar	NEAT	(5)	1.3 km	MPC · JPL
324444	2006 TS_{69}	—	October 11, 2006	Palomar	NEAT	·	1.7 km	MPC · JPL
324445	2006 TW_{75}	—	October 11, 2006	Palomar	NEAT	·	1.6 km	MPC · JPL
324446	2006 TK_{79}	—	October 12, 2006	Kitt Peak	Spacewatch	·	1.4 km	MPC · JPL
324447	2006 TR_{82}	—	October 13, 2006	Kitt Peak	Spacewatch	(5)	1.1 km	MPC · JPL
324448	2006 TU_{93}	—	October 15, 2006	Kitt Peak	Spacewatch	(5)	1.3 km	MPC · JPL
324449	2006 TR_{101}	—	October 15, 2006	Kitt Peak	Spacewatch	·	1.4 km	MPC · JPL
324450	2006 TR_{102}	—	October 15, 2006	Kitt Peak	Spacewatch	·	1.1 km	MPC · JPL
324451	2006 TA_{107}	—	October 11, 2006	Palomar	NEAT	·	2.0 km	MPC · JPL
324452	2006 TE_{124}	—	October 2, 2006	Mount Lemmon	Mount Lemmon Survey	·	1.4 km	MPC · JPL
324453	2006 TH_{124}	—	October 2, 2006	Mount Lemmon	Mount Lemmon Survey	·	1.3 km	MPC · JPL
324454	2006 TV_{124}	—	October 4, 2006	Mount Lemmon	Mount Lemmon Survey	·	1.7 km	MPC · JPL
324455	2006 UH_{1}	—	October 16, 2006	Piszkéstető	K. Sárneczky, Kuli, Z.	·	1.2 km	MPC · JPL
324456	2006 UE_{8}	—	October 16, 2006	Catalina	CSS	·	1.5 km	MPC · JPL
324457	2006 UH_{8}	—	October 16, 2006	Catalina	CSS	ERI	1.9 km	MPC · JPL
324458	2006 UR_{8}	—	October 16, 2006	Catalina	CSS	JUN	1.2 km	MPC · JPL
324459	2006 UZ_{9}	—	October 16, 2006	Kitt Peak	Spacewatch	·	1.1 km	MPC · JPL
324460	2006 UJ_{16}	—	October 17, 2006	Mount Lemmon	Mount Lemmon Survey	·	1.6 km	MPC · JPL
324461	2006 UP_{16}	—	October 17, 2006	Mount Lemmon	Mount Lemmon Survey	·	1.9 km	MPC · JPL
324462	2006 UJ_{20}	—	October 16, 2006	Kitt Peak	Spacewatch	·	840 m	MPC · JPL
324463	2006 UR_{26}	—	October 16, 2006	Kitt Peak	Spacewatch	·	1.6 km	MPC · JPL
324464	2006 UW_{26}	—	October 16, 2006	Kitt Peak	Spacewatch	·	1.2 km	MPC · JPL
324465	2006 UB_{33}	—	October 16, 2006	Kitt Peak	Spacewatch	·	1.0 km	MPC · JPL
324466	2006 UT_{42}	—	October 16, 2006	Kitt Peak	Spacewatch	·	1.7 km	MPC · JPL
324467	2006 UP_{43}	—	October 16, 2006	Kitt Peak	Spacewatch	·	2.1 km	MPC · JPL
324468	2006 UU_{53}	—	October 17, 2006	Mount Lemmon	Mount Lemmon Survey	(5)	2.1 km	MPC · JPL
324469	2006 UC_{55}	—	October 17, 2006	Mount Lemmon	Mount Lemmon Survey	·	3.7 km	MPC · JPL
324470	2006 UU_{69}	—	October 16, 2006	Catalina	CSS	·	1.4 km	MPC · JPL
324471	2006 UN_{73}	—	October 17, 2006	Kitt Peak	Spacewatch	·	1.2 km	MPC · JPL
324472	2006 UZ_{82}	—	October 17, 2006	Kitt Peak	Spacewatch	·	1.1 km	MPC · JPL
324473	2006 UC_{88}	—	October 17, 2006	Kitt Peak	Spacewatch	·	1.2 km	MPC · JPL
324474	2006 UZ_{89}	—	October 17, 2006	Kitt Peak	Spacewatch	·	1.7 km	MPC · JPL
324475	2006 UB_{92}	—	October 18, 2006	Kitt Peak	Spacewatch	·	1.4 km	MPC · JPL
324476	2006 US_{95}	—	October 18, 2006	Kitt Peak	Spacewatch	·	1.6 km	MPC · JPL
324477	2006 UU_{99}	—	October 18, 2006	Kitt Peak	Spacewatch	·	1.4 km	MPC · JPL
324478	2006 UQ_{100}	—	October 18, 2006	Kitt Peak	Spacewatch	·	1.2 km	MPC · JPL
324479	2006 UJ_{104}	—	October 18, 2006	Kitt Peak	Spacewatch	·	1.4 km	MPC · JPL
324480	2006 UN_{104}	—	October 18, 2006	Kitt Peak	Spacewatch	·	1.5 km	MPC · JPL
324481	2006 US_{108}	—	October 18, 2006	Kitt Peak	Spacewatch	·	1.4 km	MPC · JPL
324482	2006 UK_{133}	—	October 19, 2006	Kitt Peak	Spacewatch	·	1.2 km	MPC · JPL
324483	2006 UL_{135}	—	October 19, 2006	Kitt Peak	Spacewatch	·	1.4 km	MPC · JPL
324484	2006 UO_{136}	—	October 19, 2006	Mount Lemmon	Mount Lemmon Survey	(5)	1.3 km	MPC · JPL
324485	2006 UA_{142}	—	October 19, 2006	Kitt Peak	Spacewatch	·	1.5 km	MPC · JPL
324486	2006 UY_{142}	—	October 19, 2006	Kitt Peak	Spacewatch	KON	2.8 km	MPC · JPL
324487	2006 UL_{156}	—	October 21, 2006	Catalina	CSS	·	950 m	MPC · JPL
324488	2006 UD_{179}	—	October 16, 2006	Socorro	LINEAR	·	2.0 km	MPC · JPL
324489	2006 UD_{202}	—	October 22, 2006	Kitt Peak	Spacewatch	(5)	1.2 km	MPC · JPL
324490	2006 UH_{208}	—	October 23, 2006	Kitt Peak	Spacewatch	·	1.0 km	MPC · JPL
324491	2006 UK_{210}	—	October 23, 2006	Kitt Peak	Spacewatch	·	910 m	MPC · JPL
324492	2006 US_{232}	—	October 21, 2006	Palomar	NEAT	·	1.6 km	MPC · JPL
324493	2006 UO_{233}	—	October 22, 2006	Kitt Peak	Spacewatch	·	1.3 km	MPC · JPL
324494	2006 UA_{235}	—	October 22, 2006	Mount Lemmon	Mount Lemmon Survey	·	1.8 km	MPC · JPL
324495	2006 UD_{248}	—	October 27, 2006	Mount Lemmon	Mount Lemmon Survey	·	1.4 km	MPC · JPL
324496	2006 UV_{260}	—	October 20, 2006	Kitt Peak	Spacewatch	·	1.2 km	MPC · JPL
324497	2006 UN_{271}	—	October 27, 2006	Mount Lemmon	Mount Lemmon Survey	·	930 m	MPC · JPL
324498	2006 UM_{279}	—	October 28, 2006	Mount Lemmon	Mount Lemmon Survey	·	1.1 km	MPC · JPL
324499	2006 UG_{285}	—	October 28, 2006	Mount Lemmon	Mount Lemmon Survey	·	1.9 km	MPC · JPL
324500	2006 UJ_{285}	—	October 28, 2006	Mount Lemmon	Mount Lemmon Survey	·	1.0 km	MPC · JPL

== 324501–324600 ==
back to top

Designation			Discovery			Properties		Ref
Permanent	Provisional	Named after	Date	Site	Discoverer(s)	Category	Diam.	Ref
324501	2006 UQ_{286}	—	October 28, 2006	Kitt Peak	Spacewatch	·	1.1 km	MPC · JPL
324502	2006 UO_{288}	—	October 21, 2006	Kitt Peak	Spacewatch	·	1.3 km	MPC · JPL
324503	2006 UY_{328}	—	October 21, 2006	Mount Lemmon	Mount Lemmon Survey	·	1.6 km	MPC · JPL
324504	2006 UQ_{334}	—	October 20, 2006	Kitt Peak	Spacewatch	·	1.3 km	MPC · JPL
324505	2006 UC_{346}	—	October 17, 2006	Catalina	CSS	·	1.4 km	MPC · JPL
324506	2006 VZ_{5}	—	November 10, 2006	Kitt Peak	Spacewatch	·	1.3 km	MPC · JPL
324507	2006 VV_{20}	—	November 9, 2006	Kitt Peak	Spacewatch	(5)	2.3 km	MPC · JPL
324508	2006 VN_{29}	—	November 10, 2006	Kitt Peak	Spacewatch	·	1.9 km	MPC · JPL
324509	2006 VZ_{32}	—	November 11, 2006	Catalina	CSS	NYS	1.4 km	MPC · JPL
324510	2006 VG_{37}	—	November 11, 2006	Catalina	CSS	·	1.3 km	MPC · JPL
324511	2006 VH_{45}	—	November 10, 2006	Kitt Peak	Spacewatch	·	1.3 km	MPC · JPL
324512	2006 VD_{46}	—	November 9, 2006	Kitt Peak	Spacewatch	V	990 m	MPC · JPL
324513	2006 VD_{51}	—	November 10, 2006	Kitt Peak	Spacewatch	·	1.5 km	MPC · JPL
324514	2006 VH_{55}	—	November 11, 2006	Kitt Peak	Spacewatch	·	980 m	MPC · JPL
324515	2006 VS_{55}	—	November 11, 2006	Kitt Peak	Spacewatch	·	1.1 km	MPC · JPL
324516	2006 VV_{55}	—	November 11, 2006	Kitt Peak	Spacewatch	·	1.1 km	MPC · JPL
324517	2006 VV_{72}	—	November 11, 2006	Mount Lemmon	Mount Lemmon Survey	·	1.1 km	MPC · JPL
324518	2006 VW_{72}	—	November 11, 2006	Mount Lemmon	Mount Lemmon Survey	·	1.1 km	MPC · JPL
324519	2006 VC_{85}	—	November 13, 2006	Kitt Peak	Spacewatch	·	1.3 km	MPC · JPL
324520	2006 VS_{87}	—	November 14, 2006	Catalina	CSS	(5)	1.4 km	MPC · JPL
324521	2006 VS_{92}	—	November 15, 2006	Kitt Peak	Spacewatch	·	1.6 km	MPC · JPL
324522	2006 VJ_{101}	—	November 11, 2006	Kitt Peak	Spacewatch	·	2.4 km	MPC · JPL
324523	2006 VU_{106}	—	November 13, 2006	Catalina	CSS	·	2.5 km	MPC · JPL
324524	2006 VZ_{108}	—	October 20, 2006	Mount Lemmon	Mount Lemmon Survey	·	990 m	MPC · JPL
324525	2006 VZ_{111}	—	November 13, 2006	Palomar	NEAT	(5)	1.3 km	MPC · JPL
324526	2006 VX_{113}	—	November 13, 2006	Kitt Peak	Spacewatch	·	1.6 km	MPC · JPL
324527	2006 VN_{119}	—	November 14, 2006	Kitt Peak	Spacewatch	·	1.1 km	MPC · JPL
324528	2006 VA_{128}	—	November 15, 2006	Kitt Peak	Spacewatch	·	2.1 km	MPC · JPL
324529	2006 VW_{135}	—	November 15, 2006	Kitt Peak	Spacewatch	·	1.2 km	MPC · JPL
324530	2006 VJ_{138}	—	November 15, 2006	Kitt Peak	Spacewatch	JUN	970 m	MPC · JPL
324531	2006 VD_{139}	—	October 28, 2006	Mount Lemmon	Mount Lemmon Survey	·	1.2 km	MPC · JPL
324532	2006 VR_{144}	—	November 15, 2006	Catalina	CSS	·	1.2 km	MPC · JPL
324533	2006 VF_{146}	—	November 15, 2006	Catalina	CSS	·	1.6 km	MPC · JPL
324534	2006 VW_{168}	—	November 11, 2006	Kitt Peak	Spacewatch	·	1.7 km	MPC · JPL
324535	2006 VZ_{173}	—	November 15, 2006	Catalina	CSS	·	1.7 km	MPC · JPL
324536	2006 WW_{9}	—	November 16, 2006	Mount Lemmon	Mount Lemmon Survey	·	2.2 km	MPC · JPL
324537	2006 WL_{11}	—	November 16, 2006	Socorro	LINEAR	(5)	1.7 km	MPC · JPL
324538	2006 WG_{12}	—	November 16, 2006	Mount Lemmon	Mount Lemmon Survey	·	1.6 km	MPC · JPL
324539	2006 WA_{17}	—	November 17, 2006	Socorro	LINEAR	·	1.2 km	MPC · JPL
324540	2006 WT_{27}	—	November 22, 2006	7300	W. K. Y. Yeung	NYS	1.4 km	MPC · JPL
324541	2006 WM_{30}	—	November 18, 2006	Mount Lemmon	Mount Lemmon Survey	·	1.3 km	MPC · JPL
324542	2006 WZ_{34}	—	November 16, 2006	Kitt Peak	Spacewatch	V	890 m	MPC · JPL
324543	2006 WW_{41}	—	November 16, 2006	Mount Lemmon	Mount Lemmon Survey	·	1.2 km	MPC · JPL
324544	2006 WH_{42}	—	November 16, 2006	Mount Lemmon	Mount Lemmon Survey	·	1.4 km	MPC · JPL
324545	2006 WK_{44}	—	November 16, 2006	Kitt Peak	Spacewatch	(5)	1.4 km	MPC · JPL
324546	2006 WO_{48}	—	November 16, 2006	Kitt Peak	Spacewatch	(5)	1.6 km	MPC · JPL
324547	2006 WC_{50}	—	November 16, 2006	Mount Lemmon	Mount Lemmon Survey	EUN	1.5 km	MPC · JPL
324548	2006 WD_{57}	—	November 16, 2006	Kitt Peak	Spacewatch	·	1.6 km	MPC · JPL
324549	2006 WN_{64}	—	November 17, 2006	Mount Lemmon	Mount Lemmon Survey	·	1.4 km	MPC · JPL
324550	2006 WB_{68}	—	November 17, 2006	Mount Lemmon	Mount Lemmon Survey	·	1.5 km	MPC · JPL
324551	2006 WA_{69}	—	November 17, 2006	Mount Lemmon	Mount Lemmon Survey	·	1.6 km	MPC · JPL
324552	2006 WG_{78}	—	November 18, 2006	Kitt Peak	Spacewatch	·	1.1 km	MPC · JPL
324553	2006 WL_{80}	—	November 18, 2006	Kitt Peak	Spacewatch	·	1.3 km	MPC · JPL
324554	2006 WM_{82}	—	November 18, 2006	Kitt Peak	Spacewatch	·	1.1 km	MPC · JPL
324555	2006 WJ_{83}	—	November 18, 2006	Socorro	LINEAR	·	1.8 km	MPC · JPL
324556	2006 WP_{92}	—	November 19, 2006	Kitt Peak	Spacewatch	·	980 m	MPC · JPL
324557	2006 WZ_{97}	—	November 19, 2006	Kitt Peak	Spacewatch	·	1.4 km	MPC · JPL
324558	2006 WR_{98}	—	November 19, 2006	Kitt Peak	Spacewatch	·	1.4 km	MPC · JPL
324559	2006 WG_{102}	—	November 19, 2006	Kitt Peak	Spacewatch	MIS	2.3 km	MPC · JPL
324560	2006 WR_{109}	—	November 19, 2006	Kitt Peak	Spacewatch	·	1.6 km	MPC · JPL
324561	2006 WM_{111}	—	November 19, 2006	Kitt Peak	Spacewatch	·	1.7 km	MPC · JPL
324562	2006 WZ_{116}	—	November 20, 2006	Mount Lemmon	Mount Lemmon Survey	·	1.3 km	MPC · JPL
324563	2006 WC_{120}	—	November 21, 2006	Mount Lemmon	Mount Lemmon Survey	·	1.4 km	MPC · JPL
324564	2006 WP_{130}	—	November 17, 2006	Catalina	CSS	PHO	1.9 km	MPC · JPL
324565	2006 WD_{136}	—	November 19, 2006	Kitt Peak	Spacewatch	·	780 m	MPC · JPL
324566	2006 WX_{136}	—	November 19, 2006	Catalina	CSS	·	1.5 km	MPC · JPL
324567	2006 WP_{140}	—	November 20, 2006	Kitt Peak	Spacewatch	·	1.1 km	MPC · JPL
324568	2006 WF_{149}	—	November 20, 2006	Kitt Peak	Spacewatch	ADE	2.3 km	MPC · JPL
324569	2006 WM_{152}	—	November 21, 2006	Mount Lemmon	Mount Lemmon Survey	·	1.1 km	MPC · JPL
324570	2006 WW_{155}	—	November 22, 2006	Kitt Peak	Spacewatch	·	1.2 km	MPC · JPL
324571	2006 WX_{170}	—	November 11, 2006	Kitt Peak	Spacewatch	·	1.5 km	MPC · JPL
324572	2006 WN_{171}	—	November 23, 2006	Kitt Peak	Spacewatch	·	1.3 km	MPC · JPL
324573	2006 WR_{179}	—	November 24, 2006	Mount Lemmon	Mount Lemmon Survey	·	1.2 km	MPC · JPL
324574	2006 WX_{190}	—	November 25, 2006	Kitt Peak	Spacewatch	·	2.2 km	MPC · JPL
324575	2006 WO_{193}	—	November 27, 2006	Mount Lemmon	Mount Lemmon Survey	·	1.7 km	MPC · JPL
324576	2006 WH_{194}	—	November 27, 2006	Kitt Peak	Spacewatch	·	2.1 km	MPC · JPL
324577	2006 WZ_{197}	—	November 16, 2006	Mount Lemmon	Mount Lemmon Survey	·	2.9 km	MPC · JPL
324578	2006 WE_{198}	—	November 27, 2006	Mount Lemmon	Mount Lemmon Survey	·	1.8 km	MPC · JPL
324579	2006 WQ_{198}	—	November 18, 2006	Mount Lemmon	Mount Lemmon Survey	·	2.1 km	MPC · JPL
324580	2006 WT_{204}	—	November 22, 2006	Mount Lemmon	Mount Lemmon Survey	·	2.2 km	MPC · JPL
324581	2006 XC	—	December 8, 2006	Sandlot	Sandlot	·	1.6 km	MPC · JPL
324582	2006 XK	—	December 9, 2006	Socorro	LINEAR	·	2.9 km	MPC · JPL
324583	2006 XZ	—	December 9, 2006	7300	W. K. Y. Yeung	·	2.0 km	MPC · JPL
324584	2006 XZ_{11}	—	December 10, 2006	Kitt Peak	Spacewatch	·	2.1 km	MPC · JPL
324585	2006 XA_{12}	—	November 16, 2006	Kitt Peak	Spacewatch	(5)	1.4 km	MPC · JPL
324586	2006 XB_{12}	—	November 18, 2006	Socorro	LINEAR	·	1.5 km	MPC · JPL
324587	2006 XU_{15}	—	December 10, 2006	Kitt Peak	Spacewatch	(5)	1.5 km	MPC · JPL
324588	2006 XH_{17}	—	December 10, 2006	Kitt Peak	Spacewatch	·	1.5 km	MPC · JPL
324589	2006 XZ_{19}	—	December 11, 2006	Kitt Peak	Spacewatch	·	1.5 km	MPC · JPL
324590	2006 XN_{20}	—	December 11, 2006	Kitt Peak	Spacewatch	·	1.7 km	MPC · JPL
324591	2006 XF_{22}	—	December 12, 2006	Kitt Peak	Spacewatch	·	2.1 km	MPC · JPL
324592	2006 XN_{34}	—	December 11, 2006	Kitt Peak	Spacewatch	·	1.5 km	MPC · JPL
324593	2006 XJ_{46}	—	December 13, 2006	Socorro	LINEAR	JUN	1.2 km	MPC · JPL
324594	2006 XX_{47}	—	December 13, 2006	Kitt Peak	Spacewatch	EUN	1.7 km	MPC · JPL
324595	2006 XG_{53}	—	December 14, 2006	Socorro	LINEAR	·	3.6 km	MPC · JPL
324596	2006 XF_{55}	—	December 15, 2006	Socorro	LINEAR	·	2.9 km	MPC · JPL
324597	2006 XP_{55}	—	December 1, 2006	Mount Lemmon	Mount Lemmon Survey	·	1.6 km	MPC · JPL
324598	2006 XD_{59}	—	December 14, 2006	Kitt Peak	Spacewatch	·	1.7 km	MPC · JPL
324599	2006 XF_{62}	—	December 15, 2006	Mount Lemmon	Mount Lemmon Survey	·	2.9 km	MPC · JPL
324600	2006 XJ_{65}	—	December 12, 2006	Palomar	NEAT	·	2.3 km	MPC · JPL

== 324601–324700 ==
back to top

Designation			Discovery			Properties		Ref
Permanent	Provisional	Named after	Date	Site	Discoverer(s)	Category	Diam.	Ref
324601	2006 XL_{68}	—	December 13, 2006	Socorro	LINEAR	·	1.4 km	MPC · JPL
324602	2006 YF_{2}	—	December 17, 2006	7300	W. K. Y. Yeung	·	1.4 km	MPC · JPL
324603	2006 YB_{8}	—	December 20, 2006	Mount Lemmon	Mount Lemmon Survey	·	1.4 km	MPC · JPL
324604	2006 YJ_{8}	—	December 20, 2006	Mount Lemmon	Mount Lemmon Survey	·	3.0 km	MPC · JPL
324605	2006 YE_{9}	—	December 20, 2006	Mount Lemmon	Mount Lemmon Survey	·	2.0 km	MPC · JPL
324606	2006 YA_{10}	—	August 30, 2005	Kitt Peak	Spacewatch	KOR	1.7 km	MPC · JPL
324607	2006 YF_{16}	—	December 21, 2006	Palomar	NEAT	·	1.8 km	MPC · JPL
324608	2006 YP_{16}	—	December 11, 2006	Kitt Peak	Spacewatch	·	1.6 km	MPC · JPL
324609	2006 YT_{19}	—	November 21, 2006	Mount Lemmon	Mount Lemmon Survey	·	2.0 km	MPC · JPL
324610	2006 YF_{20}	—	December 21, 2006	Kitt Peak	Spacewatch	·	1.3 km	MPC · JPL
324611	2006 YV_{22}	—	December 21, 2006	Kitt Peak	Spacewatch	·	2.1 km	MPC · JPL
324612	2006 YO_{24}	—	August 4, 2005	Palomar	NEAT	·	1.8 km	MPC · JPL
324613	2006 YR_{25}	—	December 21, 2006	Kitt Peak	Spacewatch	·	2.1 km	MPC · JPL
324614	2006 YE_{33}	—	December 21, 2006	Kitt Peak	Spacewatch	·	2.8 km	MPC · JPL
324615	2006 YV_{33}	—	December 21, 2006	Kitt Peak	Spacewatch	·	1.7 km	MPC · JPL
324616	2006 YO_{37}	—	December 21, 2006	Kitt Peak	Spacewatch	·	1.5 km	MPC · JPL
324617	2006 YZ_{38}	—	December 21, 2006	Kitt Peak	Spacewatch	·	1.9 km	MPC · JPL
324618	2006 YJ_{53}	—	December 21, 2006	Kitt Peak	Spacewatch	·	2.4 km	MPC · JPL
324619	2006 YF_{55}	—	December 17, 2006	Mount Lemmon	Mount Lemmon Survey	·	1.6 km	MPC · JPL
324620	2007 AG_{1}	—	January 8, 2007	Mount Lemmon	Mount Lemmon Survey	·	2.2 km	MPC · JPL
324621	2007 AE_{10}	—	January 9, 2007	Mount Lemmon	Mount Lemmon Survey	·	2.0 km	MPC · JPL
324622	2007 AQ_{10}	—	January 10, 2007	Socorro	LINEAR	·	1.8 km	MPC · JPL
324623	2007 AQ_{21}	—	January 15, 2007	Catalina	CSS	·	1.7 km	MPC · JPL
324624	2007 AQ_{23}	—	November 15, 2006	Mount Lemmon	Mount Lemmon Survey	(18466)	3.5 km	MPC · JPL
324625	2007 AV_{29}	—	January 10, 2007	Mount Lemmon	Mount Lemmon Survey	AGN	1.5 km	MPC · JPL
324626	2007 BT_{5}	—	January 17, 2007	Palomar	NEAT	·	2.7 km	MPC · JPL
324627	2007 BW_{5}	—	January 17, 2007	Palomar	NEAT	·	4.0 km	MPC · JPL
324628	2007 BY_{6}	—	January 17, 2007	Mount Lemmon	Mount Lemmon Survey	·	3.0 km	MPC · JPL
324629	2007 BJ_{13}	—	January 17, 2007	Kitt Peak	Spacewatch	·	2.2 km	MPC · JPL
324630	2007 BK_{14}	—	January 17, 2007	Kitt Peak	Spacewatch	NEM	2.6 km	MPC · JPL
324631	2007 BR_{14}	—	January 17, 2007	Kitt Peak	Spacewatch	·	2.0 km	MPC · JPL
324632	2007 BP_{27}	—	January 24, 2007	Catalina	CSS	·	3.3 km	MPC · JPL
324633	2007 BT_{27}	—	January 24, 2007	Catalina	CSS	·	2.7 km	MPC · JPL
324634	2007 BW_{38}	—	January 24, 2007	Catalina	CSS	NEM	2.6 km	MPC · JPL
324635	2007 BT_{39}	—	January 24, 2007	Mount Lemmon	Mount Lemmon Survey	MIS	2.6 km	MPC · JPL
324636	2007 BA_{41}	—	January 24, 2007	Mount Lemmon	Mount Lemmon Survey	·	2.1 km	MPC · JPL
324637	2007 BU_{42}	—	January 24, 2007	Mount Lemmon	Mount Lemmon Survey	GEF	1.1 km	MPC · JPL
324638	2007 BT_{47}	—	January 26, 2007	Kitt Peak	Spacewatch	AEO	1.2 km	MPC · JPL
324639	2007 BA_{67}	—	January 27, 2007	Mount Lemmon	Mount Lemmon Survey	·	2.2 km	MPC · JPL
324640	2007 BP_{71}	—	November 3, 2005	Kitt Peak	Spacewatch	·	2.3 km	MPC · JPL
324641	2007 BP_{74}	—	January 17, 2007	Kitt Peak	Spacewatch	EUN	1.4 km	MPC · JPL
324642	2007 BB_{76}	—	January 28, 2007	Mount Lemmon	Mount Lemmon Survey	·	2.3 km	MPC · JPL
324643	2007 BG_{76}	—	January 17, 2007	Catalina	CSS	·	2.4 km	MPC · JPL
324644	2007 CV	—	February 6, 2007	Kitt Peak	Spacewatch	·	2.9 km	MPC · JPL
324645	2007 CU_{4}	—	February 6, 2007	Mount Lemmon	Mount Lemmon Survey	NEM	2.5 km	MPC · JPL
324646	2007 CU_{5}	—	February 5, 2007	Palomar	NEAT	MAR	1.8 km	MPC · JPL
324647	2007 CE_{11}	—	February 6, 2007	Mount Lemmon	Mount Lemmon Survey	·	2.0 km	MPC · JPL
324648	2007 CE_{13}	—	April 4, 2003	Kitt Peak	Spacewatch	AGN	1.6 km	MPC · JPL
324649	2007 CK_{18}	—	February 8, 2007	Mount Lemmon	Mount Lemmon Survey	GEF	1.8 km	MPC · JPL
324650	2007 CQ_{19}	—	February 6, 2007	Kitt Peak	Spacewatch	·	2.1 km	MPC · JPL
324651	2007 CL_{24}	—	April 5, 2003	Kitt Peak	Spacewatch	HOF	2.6 km	MPC · JPL
324652	2007 CZ_{28}	—	February 6, 2007	Mount Lemmon	Mount Lemmon Survey	HOF	2.6 km	MPC · JPL
324653	2007 CA_{32}	—	November 22, 2006	Mount Lemmon	Mount Lemmon Survey	DOR	2.6 km	MPC · JPL
324654	2007 CP_{37}	—	February 6, 2007	Kitt Peak	Spacewatch	·	3.0 km	MPC · JPL
324655	2007 CK_{50}	—	February 8, 2007	Palomar	NEAT	·	2.8 km	MPC · JPL
324656	2007 CJ_{52}	—	February 10, 2007	Catalina	CSS	·	2.4 km	MPC · JPL
324657	2007 CV_{52}	—	November 28, 2006	Mount Lemmon	Mount Lemmon Survey	·	1.8 km	MPC · JPL
324658	2007 CL_{61}	—	February 15, 2007	Palomar	NEAT	·	2.9 km	MPC · JPL
324659	2007 CC_{65}	—	February 6, 2007	Kitt Peak	Spacewatch	·	2.3 km	MPC · JPL
324660	2007 DR	—	February 18, 2007	Mayhill	Lowe, A.	·	2.9 km	MPC · JPL
324661	2007 DA_{5}	—	January 25, 2007	Kitt Peak	Spacewatch	EUN	1.5 km	MPC · JPL
324662	2007 DK_{9}	—	December 24, 2006	Mount Lemmon	Mount Lemmon Survey	·	2.2 km	MPC · JPL
324663	2007 DZ_{17}	—	February 17, 2007	Kitt Peak	Spacewatch	·	1.5 km	MPC · JPL
324664	2007 DP_{19}	—	February 17, 2007	Kitt Peak	Spacewatch	·	2.3 km	MPC · JPL
324665	2007 DG_{20}	—	February 17, 2007	Kitt Peak	Spacewatch	·	2.3 km	MPC · JPL
324666	2007 DU_{28}	—	August 15, 2004	Cerro Tololo	Deep Ecliptic Survey	·	2.2 km	MPC · JPL
324667	2007 DW_{31}	—	February 17, 2007	Kitt Peak	Spacewatch	·	2.1 km	MPC · JPL
324668	2007 DO_{34}	—	February 17, 2007	Kitt Peak	Spacewatch	·	1.9 km	MPC · JPL
324669	2007 DG_{40}	—	February 19, 2007	Kitt Peak	Spacewatch	·	1.8 km	MPC · JPL
324670	2007 DX_{48}	—	February 21, 2007	Mount Lemmon	Mount Lemmon Survey	·	2.5 km	MPC · JPL
324671	2007 DH_{58}	—	November 22, 2005	Kitt Peak	Spacewatch	KOR	1.4 km	MPC · JPL
324672	2007 DE_{61}	—	February 22, 2007	Kitt Peak	Spacewatch	·	1.9 km	MPC · JPL
324673	2007 DR_{62}	—	January 26, 2007	Kitt Peak	Spacewatch	·	2.0 km	MPC · JPL
324674	2007 DX_{63}	—	February 21, 2007	Kitt Peak	Spacewatch	KOR	1.2 km	MPC · JPL
324675	2007 DY_{72}	—	February 21, 2007	Kitt Peak	Spacewatch	AGN	1.2 km	MPC · JPL
324676	2007 DC_{79}	—	February 23, 2007	Kitt Peak	Spacewatch	·	1.9 km	MPC · JPL
324677	2007 DM_{84}	—	February 25, 2007	Mount Lemmon	Mount Lemmon Survey	·	4.1 km	MPC · JPL
324678	2007 DB_{93}	—	February 23, 2007	Socorro	LINEAR	·	2.3 km	MPC · JPL
324679	2007 DN_{93}	—	February 23, 2007	Kitt Peak	Spacewatch	·	2.2 km	MPC · JPL
324680	2007 DB_{103}	—	January 27, 2007	Kitt Peak	Spacewatch	·	1.9 km	MPC · JPL
324681	2007 DL_{105}	—	February 16, 2007	Mount Lemmon	Mount Lemmon Survey	·	2.1 km	MPC · JPL
324682	2007 DE_{106}	—	February 23, 2007	Kitt Peak	Spacewatch	KOR	1.6 km	MPC · JPL
324683	2007 DR_{113}	—	February 21, 2007	Mount Lemmon	Mount Lemmon Survey	·	2.7 km	MPC · JPL
324684	2007 EC_{2}	—	March 9, 2007	Kitt Peak	Spacewatch	KOR	1.3 km	MPC · JPL
324685	2007 ED_{2}	—	March 9, 2007	Kitt Peak	Spacewatch	KOR	1.5 km	MPC · JPL
324686	2007 ED_{7}	—	March 9, 2007	Mount Lemmon	Mount Lemmon Survey	KOR	1.5 km	MPC · JPL
324687	2007 ED_{9}	—	December 25, 2005	Kitt Peak	Spacewatch	THM	2.3 km	MPC · JPL
324688	2007 EJ_{10}	—	March 6, 2007	Palomar	NEAT	·	2.3 km	MPC · JPL
324689	2007 EP_{16}	—	March 9, 2007	Kitt Peak	Spacewatch	·	2.8 km	MPC · JPL
324690	2007 EB_{17}	—	March 9, 2007	Kitt Peak	Spacewatch	·	2.4 km	MPC · JPL
324691	2007 EC_{19}	—	February 21, 2007	Mount Lemmon	Mount Lemmon Survey	·	1.6 km	MPC · JPL
324692	2007 EF_{29}	—	March 9, 2007	Mount Lemmon	Mount Lemmon Survey	·	2.4 km	MPC · JPL
324693	2007 EN_{38}	—	March 11, 2007	Kitt Peak	Spacewatch	·	2.3 km	MPC · JPL
324694	2007 EC_{42}	—	March 9, 2007	Kitt Peak	Spacewatch	·	2.3 km	MPC · JPL
324695	2007 EM_{42}	—	March 9, 2007	Kitt Peak	Spacewatch	·	2.6 km	MPC · JPL
324696	2007 EH_{46}	—	March 9, 2007	Mount Lemmon	Mount Lemmon Survey	·	2.5 km	MPC · JPL
324697	2007 EP_{46}	—	March 9, 2007	Kitt Peak	Spacewatch	·	2.9 km	MPC · JPL
324698	2007 EL_{56}	—	March 12, 2007	Kitt Peak	Spacewatch	EOS	1.6 km	MPC · JPL
324699	2007 ED_{75}	—	March 10, 2007	Kitt Peak	Spacewatch	·	2.9 km	MPC · JPL
324700	2007 EN_{92}	—	March 10, 2007	Palomar	NEAT	GEF	1.9 km	MPC · JPL

== 324701–324800 ==
back to top

Designation			Discovery			Properties		Ref
Permanent	Provisional	Named after	Date	Site	Discoverer(s)	Category	Diam.	Ref
324701	2007 EQ_{93}	—	March 10, 2007	Kitt Peak	Spacewatch	·	3.4 km	MPC · JPL
324702	2007 EL_{97}	—	March 11, 2007	Kitt Peak	Spacewatch	·	2.6 km	MPC · JPL
324703	2007 EQ_{100}	—	March 11, 2007	Catalina	CSS	·	3.1 km	MPC · JPL
324704	2007 EX_{101}	—	March 11, 2007	Kitt Peak	Spacewatch	·	3.1 km	MPC · JPL
324705	2007 EV_{109}	—	March 11, 2007	Kitt Peak	Spacewatch	KOR	1.7 km	MPC · JPL
324706	2007 EJ_{111}	—	February 26, 2007	Mount Lemmon	Mount Lemmon Survey	·	1.8 km	MPC · JPL
324707	2007 EH_{112}	—	March 11, 2007	Kitt Peak	Spacewatch	·	3.1 km	MPC · JPL
324708	2007 EJ_{117}	—	March 13, 2007	Mount Lemmon	Mount Lemmon Survey	VER	3.4 km	MPC · JPL
324709	2007 EZ_{117}	—	March 13, 2007	Mount Lemmon	Mount Lemmon Survey	·	2.1 km	MPC · JPL
324710	2007 EN_{126}	—	March 9, 2007	Kitt Peak	Spacewatch	MRX	950 m	MPC · JPL
324711	2007 EA_{131}	—	March 9, 2007	Mount Lemmon	Mount Lemmon Survey	KOR	1.4 km	MPC · JPL
324712	2007 EQ_{131}	—	March 9, 2007	Mount Lemmon	Mount Lemmon Survey	·	1.6 km	MPC · JPL
324713	2007 EU_{133}	—	March 9, 2007	Mount Lemmon	Mount Lemmon Survey	MRX	1.5 km	MPC · JPL
324714	2007 EA_{134}	—	March 9, 2007	Mount Lemmon	Mount Lemmon Survey	·	2.1 km	MPC · JPL
324715	2007 EG_{134}	—	March 9, 2007	Mount Lemmon	Mount Lemmon Survey	·	2.3 km	MPC · JPL
324716	2007 EF_{135}	—	March 10, 2007	Mount Lemmon	Mount Lemmon Survey	KOR	1.3 km	MPC · JPL
324717	2007 EK_{135}	—	March 10, 2007	Mount Lemmon	Mount Lemmon Survey	KOR	1.3 km	MPC · JPL
324718	2007 EB_{139}	—	March 12, 2007	Kitt Peak	Spacewatch	·	2.2 km	MPC · JPL
324719	2007 EW_{139}	—	March 12, 2007	Kitt Peak	Spacewatch	·	2.3 km	MPC · JPL
324720	2007 ER_{144}	—	March 12, 2007	Mount Lemmon	Mount Lemmon Survey	KOR	1.5 km	MPC · JPL
324721	2007 ES_{144}	—	February 26, 2007	Mount Lemmon	Mount Lemmon Survey	EOS	1.8 km	MPC · JPL
324722	2007 EO_{145}	—	March 12, 2007	Mount Lemmon	Mount Lemmon Survey	·	1.6 km	MPC · JPL
324723	2007 EY_{146}	—	March 12, 2007	Mount Lemmon	Mount Lemmon Survey	·	3.1 km	MPC · JPL
324724	2007 ES_{147}	—	March 12, 2007	Mount Lemmon	Mount Lemmon Survey	KOR	1.7 km	MPC · JPL
324725	2007 EA_{151}	—	March 12, 2007	Mount Lemmon	Mount Lemmon Survey	KOR	1.6 km	MPC · JPL
324726	2007 EG_{165}	—	March 15, 2007	Mount Lemmon	Mount Lemmon Survey	·	3.0 km	MPC · JPL
324727	2007 EO_{166}	—	March 11, 2007	Mount Lemmon	Mount Lemmon Survey	·	2.3 km	MPC · JPL
324728	2007 EC_{168}	—	March 13, 2007	Kitt Peak	Spacewatch	·	3.0 km	MPC · JPL
324729	2007 EH_{170}	—	March 15, 2007	Kitt Peak	Spacewatch	·	2.2 km	MPC · JPL
324730	2007 EZ_{170}	—	March 15, 2007	Catalina	CSS	·	2.9 km	MPC · JPL
324731	2007 ES_{171}	—	March 11, 2007	Mount Lemmon	Mount Lemmon Survey	EOS	2.6 km	MPC · JPL
324732	2007 EY_{174}	—	March 14, 2007	Kitt Peak	Spacewatch	EUP	4.7 km	MPC · JPL
324733	2007 EX_{179}	—	March 14, 2007	Mount Lemmon	Mount Lemmon Survey	·	2.8 km	MPC · JPL
324734	2007 EO_{181}	—	March 14, 2007	Kitt Peak	Spacewatch	·	4.2 km	MPC · JPL
324735	2007 EY_{182}	—	March 15, 2007	Mount Lemmon	Mount Lemmon Survey	·	5.0 km	MPC · JPL
324736	2007 EX_{190}	—	February 25, 2007	Mount Lemmon	Mount Lemmon Survey	EOS	2.1 km	MPC · JPL
324737	2007 EA_{191}	—	March 13, 2007	Kitt Peak	Spacewatch	·	3.2 km	MPC · JPL
324738	2007 EF_{192}	—	March 10, 2007	Kitt Peak	Spacewatch	·	2.7 km	MPC · JPL
324739	2007 EF_{197}	—	March 15, 2007	Kitt Peak	Spacewatch	·	2.1 km	MPC · JPL
324740	2007 EU_{202}	—	March 9, 2007	Mount Lemmon	Mount Lemmon Survey	EOS	1.5 km	MPC · JPL
324741	2007 ET_{210}	—	March 8, 2007	Palomar	NEAT	GAL	2.0 km	MPC · JPL
324742	2007 EJ_{217}	—	March 10, 2007	Kitt Peak	Spacewatch	·	2.8 km	MPC · JPL
324743	2007 EC_{222}	—	March 11, 2007	Mount Lemmon	Mount Lemmon Survey	·	3.5 km	MPC · JPL
324744	2007 ES_{222}	—	March 15, 2007	Mount Lemmon	Mount Lemmon Survey	·	2.5 km	MPC · JPL
324745	2007 EH_{223}	—	March 14, 2007	Siding Spring	SSS	·	3.2 km	MPC · JPL
324746	2007 EH_{224}	—	March 14, 2007	Kitt Peak	Spacewatch	·	2.0 km	MPC · JPL
324747	2007 FO_{6}	—	March 16, 2007	Mount Lemmon	Mount Lemmon Survey	·	1.7 km	MPC · JPL
324748	2007 FQ_{25}	—	March 20, 2007	Kitt Peak	Spacewatch	·	1.6 km	MPC · JPL
324749	2007 FW_{30}	—	March 20, 2007	Mount Lemmon	Mount Lemmon Survey	·	2.6 km	MPC · JPL
324750	2007 FR_{32}	—	March 20, 2007	Kitt Peak	Spacewatch	·	2.6 km	MPC · JPL
324751	2007 FF_{33}	—	March 21, 2007	Socorro	LINEAR	·	2.8 km	MPC · JPL
324752	2007 FS_{40}	—	March 9, 2007	Kitt Peak	Spacewatch	·	3.3 km	MPC · JPL
324753	2007 FQ_{44}	—	March 20, 2007	Mount Lemmon	Mount Lemmon Survey	·	1.9 km	MPC · JPL
324754	2007 FQ_{45}	—	March 26, 2007	Mount Lemmon	Mount Lemmon Survey	VER	3.1 km	MPC · JPL
324755	2007 FN_{46}	—	March 26, 2007	Mount Lemmon	Mount Lemmon Survey	EOS	2.3 km	MPC · JPL
324756	2007 FQ_{49}	—	March 26, 2007	Catalina	CSS	·	2.6 km	MPC · JPL
324757	2007 GB_{4}	—	April 6, 2007	Charleston	Astronomical Research Observatory	TEL	1.7 km	MPC · JPL
324758	2007 GC_{5}	—	April 11, 2007	Bergisch Gladbach	W. Bickel	·	2.9 km	MPC · JPL
324759	2007 GL_{15}	—	April 11, 2007	Mount Lemmon	Mount Lemmon Survey	·	2.0 km	MPC · JPL
324760	2007 GV_{16}	—	April 11, 2007	Kitt Peak	Spacewatch	THM	2.6 km	MPC · JPL
324761	2007 GC_{18}	—	April 11, 2007	Kitt Peak	Spacewatch	·	2.6 km	MPC · JPL
324762	2007 GS_{19}	—	April 11, 2007	Kitt Peak	Spacewatch	·	2.7 km	MPC · JPL
324763	2007 GB_{25}	—	March 28, 2007	Siding Spring	SSS	·	4.8 km	MPC · JPL
324764	2007 GH_{29}	—	April 11, 2007	Mount Lemmon	Mount Lemmon Survey	·	2.2 km	MPC · JPL
324765	2007 GK_{33}	—	April 11, 2007	Mount Lemmon	Mount Lemmon Survey	·	2.8 km	MPC · JPL
324766	2007 GS_{33}	—	April 11, 2007	Mount Lemmon	Mount Lemmon Survey	·	3.5 km	MPC · JPL
324767	2007 GJ_{37}	—	April 14, 2007	Kitt Peak	Spacewatch	·	2.6 km	MPC · JPL
324768	2007 GA_{38}	—	April 14, 2007	Kitt Peak	Spacewatch	·	2.7 km	MPC · JPL
324769	2007 GW_{39}	—	April 14, 2007	Kitt Peak	Spacewatch	·	2.2 km	MPC · JPL
324770	2007 GR_{40}	—	April 14, 2007	Kitt Peak	Spacewatch	EOS	2.0 km	MPC · JPL
324771	2007 GC_{42}	—	April 14, 2007	Kitt Peak	Spacewatch	·	2.6 km	MPC · JPL
324772	2007 GD_{45}	—	April 14, 2007	Kitt Peak	Spacewatch	(1298)	3.0 km	MPC · JPL
324773	2007 GF_{46}	—	April 14, 2007	Kitt Peak	Spacewatch	URS	4.0 km	MPC · JPL
324774	2007 GX_{46}	—	April 14, 2007	Kitt Peak	Spacewatch	EOS	2.4 km	MPC · JPL
324775	2007 GM_{48}	—	April 14, 2007	Kitt Peak	Spacewatch	·	4.9 km	MPC · JPL
324776	2007 GE_{49}	—	April 14, 2007	Mount Lemmon	Mount Lemmon Survey	·	4.0 km	MPC · JPL
324777	2007 GZ_{51}	—	April 15, 2007	Kitt Peak	Spacewatch	EOS	2.3 km	MPC · JPL
324778	2007 GF_{53}	—	April 14, 2007	Mount Lemmon	Mount Lemmon Survey	EOS	2.2 km	MPC · JPL
324779	2007 GJ_{57}	—	April 15, 2007	Kitt Peak	Spacewatch	·	2.0 km	MPC · JPL
324780	2007 GK_{58}	—	April 15, 2007	Kitt Peak	Spacewatch	·	2.9 km	MPC · JPL
324781	2007 GW_{58}	—	April 15, 2007	Mount Lemmon	Mount Lemmon Survey	·	2.0 km	MPC · JPL
324782	2007 GQ_{61}	—	April 15, 2007	Kitt Peak	Spacewatch	·	3.6 km	MPC · JPL
324783	2007 GH_{66}	—	October 7, 2004	Kitt Peak	Spacewatch	·	4.2 km	MPC · JPL
324784	2007 GN_{66}	—	April 15, 2007	Kitt Peak	Spacewatch	EOS	2.5 km	MPC · JPL
324785	2007 GS_{66}	—	April 15, 2007	Kitt Peak	Spacewatch	·	2.9 km	MPC · JPL
324786	2007 GC_{73}	—	April 15, 2007	Catalina	CSS	615	1.5 km	MPC · JPL
324787 Włodarczyk	2007 GR_{75}	Włodarczyk	April 15, 2007	Moletai	K. Černis	·	4.3 km	MPC · JPL
324788	2007 GU_{75}	—	April 15, 2007	Kitt Peak	Spacewatch	VER	4.3 km	MPC · JPL
324789	2007 GA_{76}	—	April 14, 2007	Kitt Peak	Spacewatch	·	2.5 km	MPC · JPL
324790	2007 HJ_{7}	—	April 16, 2007	Catalina	CSS	·	4.6 km	MPC · JPL
324791	2007 HT_{10}	—	April 18, 2007	Mount Lemmon	Mount Lemmon Survey	EOS	2.1 km	MPC · JPL
324792	2007 HV_{12}	—	April 16, 2007	Catalina	CSS	EMA	3.8 km	MPC · JPL
324793	2007 HH_{13}	—	April 18, 2007	Kitt Peak	Spacewatch	·	3.5 km	MPC · JPL
324794	2007 HZ_{15}	—	April 18, 2007	Kitt Peak	Spacewatch	·	4.0 km	MPC · JPL
324795	2007 HW_{19}	—	April 18, 2007	Kitt Peak	Spacewatch	·	2.4 km	MPC · JPL
324796	2007 HZ_{19}	—	April 18, 2007	Kitt Peak	Spacewatch	·	3.3 km	MPC · JPL
324797	2007 HG_{20}	—	April 18, 2007	Kitt Peak	Spacewatch	EOS	2.0 km	MPC · JPL
324798	2007 HO_{20}	—	April 18, 2007	Kitt Peak	Spacewatch	EOS	2.4 km	MPC · JPL
324799	2007 HD_{29}	—	April 19, 2007	Anderson Mesa	LONEOS	·	4.3 km	MPC · JPL
324800	2007 HP_{44}	—	April 18, 2007	Mount Lemmon	Mount Lemmon Survey	·	2.4 km	MPC · JPL

== 324801–324900 ==
back to top

Designation			Discovery			Properties		Ref
Permanent	Provisional	Named after	Date	Site	Discoverer(s)	Category	Diam.	Ref
324801	2007 HO_{45}	—	April 18, 2007	Kitt Peak	Spacewatch	·	2.7 km	MPC · JPL
324802	2007 HW_{45}	—	April 18, 2007	Mount Lemmon	Mount Lemmon Survey	·	4.1 km	MPC · JPL
324803	2007 HY_{46}	—	April 20, 2007	Mount Lemmon	Mount Lemmon Survey	VER	2.9 km	MPC · JPL
324804	2007 HL_{48}	—	April 20, 2007	Kitt Peak	Spacewatch	·	4.4 km	MPC · JPL
324805	2007 HH_{49}	—	April 20, 2007	Kitt Peak	Spacewatch	·	3.1 km	MPC · JPL
324806	2007 HN_{49}	—	April 20, 2007	Kitt Peak	Spacewatch	·	4.4 km	MPC · JPL
324807	2007 HL_{50}	—	April 20, 2007	Kitt Peak	Spacewatch	·	3.8 km	MPC · JPL
324808	2007 HE_{53}	—	April 20, 2007	Kitt Peak	Spacewatch	T_{j} (2.98) · EUP	6.2 km	MPC · JPL
324809	2007 HB_{57}	—	April 22, 2007	Mount Lemmon	Mount Lemmon Survey	·	2.9 km	MPC · JPL
324810	2007 HT_{59}	—	April 18, 2007	Mount Lemmon	Mount Lemmon Survey	·	1.8 km	MPC · JPL
324811	2007 HW_{59}	—	April 18, 2007	Mount Lemmon	Mount Lemmon Survey	EOS	2.3 km	MPC · JPL
324812	2007 HY_{59}	—	April 18, 2007	Mount Lemmon	Mount Lemmon Survey	·	3.3 km	MPC · JPL
324813	2007 HY_{64}	—	April 22, 2007	Mount Lemmon	Mount Lemmon Survey	EOS	2.8 km	MPC · JPL
324814	2007 HO_{66}	—	April 22, 2007	Mount Lemmon	Mount Lemmon Survey	·	6.5 km	MPC · JPL
324815	2007 HU_{67}	—	April 23, 2007	Kitt Peak	Spacewatch	·	3.3 km	MPC · JPL
324816	2007 HD_{71}	—	April 20, 2007	Lulin	LUSS	·	4.1 km	MPC · JPL
324817	2007 HZ_{75}	—	April 22, 2007	Kitt Peak	Spacewatch	·	3.8 km	MPC · JPL
324818	2007 HU_{80}	—	April 25, 2007	Mount Lemmon	Mount Lemmon Survey	·	2.2 km	MPC · JPL
324819	2007 HZ_{80}	—	April 25, 2007	Mount Lemmon	Mount Lemmon Survey	·	1.9 km	MPC · JPL
324820	2007 HB_{81}	—	April 25, 2007	Mount Lemmon	Mount Lemmon Survey	·	4.6 km	MPC · JPL
324821	2007 HR_{81}	—	April 25, 2007	Mount Lemmon	Mount Lemmon Survey	·	3.4 km	MPC · JPL
324822	2007 HQ_{84}	—	April 22, 2007	Kitt Peak	Spacewatch	·	2.9 km	MPC · JPL
324823	2007 HL_{86}	—	April 24, 2007	Kitt Peak	Spacewatch	·	4.9 km	MPC · JPL
324824	2007 HE_{87}	—	April 24, 2007	Kitt Peak	Spacewatch	·	3.1 km	MPC · JPL
324825	2007 HY_{90}	—	April 16, 2007	Mount Lemmon	Mount Lemmon Survey	·	2.4 km	MPC · JPL
324826	2007 HV_{91}	—	April 20, 2007	Mount Lemmon	Mount Lemmon Survey	KOR	1.5 km	MPC · JPL
324827	2007 HL_{96}	—	April 18, 2007	Kitt Peak	Spacewatch	·	4.0 km	MPC · JPL
324828	2007 HM_{96}	—	April 18, 2007	Kitt Peak	Spacewatch	·	4.1 km	MPC · JPL
324829	2007 HC_{97}	—	March 25, 2007	Mount Lemmon	Mount Lemmon Survey	·	2.7 km	MPC · JPL
324830	2007 HU_{97}	—	April 22, 2007	Mount Lemmon	Mount Lemmon Survey	·	3.4 km	MPC · JPL
324831	2007 JU_{1}	—	May 7, 2007	Catalina	CSS	·	3.7 km	MPC · JPL
324832	2007 JG_{3}	—	January 5, 2006	Catalina	CSS	·	4.6 km	MPC · JPL
324833	2007 JQ_{3}	—	May 6, 2007	Kitt Peak	Spacewatch	EOS	2.1 km	MPC · JPL
324834	2007 JN_{9}	—	May 9, 2007	Catalina	CSS	THB	3.4 km	MPC · JPL
324835	2007 JB_{10}	—	May 11, 2007	Catalina	CSS	H	760 m	MPC · JPL
324836	2007 JD_{12}	—	May 7, 2007	Kitt Peak	Spacewatch	·	3.5 km	MPC · JPL
324837	2007 JP_{12}	—	May 7, 2007	Kitt Peak	Spacewatch	·	5.8 km	MPC · JPL
324838	2007 JB_{13}	—	May 7, 2007	Kitt Peak	Spacewatch	·	4.1 km	MPC · JPL
324839	2007 JZ_{36}	—	May 9, 2007	Catalina	CSS	VER	4.0 km	MPC · JPL
324840	2007 JZ_{42}	—	May 15, 2007	Mount Lemmon	Mount Lemmon Survey	H	620 m	MPC · JPL
324841	2007 JC_{43}	—	May 10, 2007	Anderson Mesa	LONEOS	EOS	3.0 km	MPC · JPL
324842	2007 JG_{44}	—	May 12, 2007	Purple Mountain	PMO NEO Survey Program	·	4.7 km	MPC · JPL
324843	2007 KM	—	May 16, 2007	Kitt Peak	Spacewatch	·	1.8 km	MPC · JPL
324844	2007 KW_{3}	—	May 23, 2007	Mount Lemmon	Mount Lemmon Survey	·	5.0 km	MPC · JPL
324845	2007 KD_{4}	—	May 23, 2007	7300	W. K. Y. Yeung	·	3.3 km	MPC · JPL
324846	2007 KY_{5}	—	May 24, 2007	Mount Lemmon	Mount Lemmon Survey	·	2.9 km	MPC · JPL
324847	2007 LS_{1}	—	June 7, 2007	Kitt Peak	Spacewatch	·	3.3 km	MPC · JPL
324848	2007 LW_{5}	—	May 13, 2007	Kitt Peak	Spacewatch	·	3.7 km	MPC · JPL
324849	2007 LN_{6}	—	June 8, 2007	Kitt Peak	Spacewatch	EOS	2.9 km	MPC · JPL
324850	2007 LS_{6}	—	June 8, 2007	Kitt Peak	Spacewatch	·	3.1 km	MPC · JPL
324851	2007 LU_{7}	—	June 8, 2007	Kitt Peak	Spacewatch	·	5.1 km	MPC · JPL
324852	2007 LZ_{7}	—	April 25, 2007	Kitt Peak	Spacewatch	·	3.7 km	MPC · JPL
324853	2007 LO_{8}	—	June 9, 2007	Kitt Peak	Spacewatch	·	4.3 km	MPC · JPL
324854	2007 LD_{27}	—	June 12, 2007	Kitt Peak	Spacewatch	URS	2.9 km	MPC · JPL
324855	2007 LH_{28}	—	June 15, 2007	Kitt Peak	Spacewatch	·	3.2 km	MPC · JPL
324856	2007 LL_{33}	—	June 6, 2007	Catalina	CSS	T_{j} (2.96)	3.5 km	MPC · JPL
324857	2007 LG_{34}	—	June 8, 2007	Kitt Peak	Spacewatch	EMA	3.2 km	MPC · JPL
324858	2007 LB_{37}	—	June 12, 2007	Kitt Peak	Spacewatch	·	4.8 km	MPC · JPL
324859	2007 MS_{4}	—	June 17, 2007	Kitt Peak	Spacewatch	EOS	2.4 km	MPC · JPL
324860	2007 RO_{227}	—	September 10, 2007	Mount Lemmon	Mount Lemmon Survey	·	720 m	MPC · JPL
324861	2007 RM_{290}	—	September 10, 2007	Mount Lemmon	Mount Lemmon Survey	PHO	1.2 km	MPC · JPL
324862	2007 RU_{301}	—	September 14, 2007	Mount Lemmon	Mount Lemmon Survey	·	650 m	MPC · JPL
324863	2007 TC_{6}	—	October 6, 2007	Pla D'Arguines	R. Ferrando	(883)	820 m	MPC · JPL
324864	2007 TW_{66}	—	October 12, 2007	7300	W. K. Y. Yeung	·	550 m	MPC · JPL
324865	2007 TQ_{119}	—	October 9, 2007	Mount Lemmon	Mount Lemmon Survey	·	540 m	MPC · JPL
324866	2007 TZ_{125}	—	October 6, 2007	Kitt Peak	Spacewatch	·	650 m	MPC · JPL
324867	2007 TX_{142}	—	October 15, 2007	Dauban	Chante-Perdrix	·	840 m	MPC · JPL
324868	2007 TX_{171}	—	October 13, 2007	Socorro	LINEAR	·	720 m	MPC · JPL
324869	2007 TN_{211}	—	October 7, 2007	Kitt Peak	Spacewatch	·	1 km	MPC · JPL
324870	2007 TU_{218}	—	October 7, 2007	Kitt Peak	Spacewatch	·	620 m	MPC · JPL
324871	2007 TT_{231}	—	October 8, 2007	Kitt Peak	Spacewatch	·	830 m	MPC · JPL
324872	2007 TT_{232}	—	October 8, 2007	Kitt Peak	Spacewatch	·	680 m	MPC · JPL
324873	2007 TV_{272}	—	October 9, 2007	Kitt Peak	Spacewatch	·	790 m	MPC · JPL
324874	2007 TD_{275}	—	October 11, 2007	Catalina	CSS	·	840 m	MPC · JPL
324875	2007 TW_{293}	—	October 9, 2007	Mount Lemmon	Mount Lemmon Survey	·	780 m	MPC · JPL
324876	2007 TK_{318}	—	September 10, 2007	Mount Lemmon	Mount Lemmon Survey	·	560 m	MPC · JPL
324877	2007 TZ_{362}	—	October 14, 2007	Mount Lemmon	Mount Lemmon Survey	·	740 m	MPC · JPL
324878	2007 TU_{373}	—	October 14, 2007	Kitt Peak	Spacewatch	·	810 m	MPC · JPL
324879	2007 TN_{380}	—	October 14, 2007	Kitt Peak	Spacewatch	·	640 m	MPC · JPL
324880	2007 TT_{392}	—	October 15, 2007	Catalina	CSS	·	830 m	MPC · JPL
324881	2007 TP_{398}	—	October 15, 2007	Kitt Peak	Spacewatch	·	700 m	MPC · JPL
324882	2007 TG_{442}	—	October 11, 2007	Catalina	CSS	·	820 m	MPC · JPL
324883	2007 UH_{14}	—	October 16, 2007	Kitt Peak	Spacewatch	·	870 m	MPC · JPL
324884	2007 UG_{25}	—	October 16, 2007	Kitt Peak	Spacewatch	·	610 m	MPC · JPL
324885	2007 UD_{38}	—	October 19, 2007	Kitt Peak	Spacewatch	·	760 m	MPC · JPL
324886	2007 UE_{44}	—	April 4, 2002	Kitt Peak	Spacewatch	·	620 m	MPC · JPL
324887	2007 UN_{65}	—	October 31, 2007	Catalina	CSS	·	1.6 km	MPC · JPL
324888	2007 UN_{71}	—	October 30, 2007	Catalina	CSS	·	950 m	MPC · JPL
324889	2007 UN_{101}	—	October 30, 2007	Kitt Peak	Spacewatch	·	650 m	MPC · JPL
324890	2007 UK_{132}	—	October 19, 2007	Mount Lemmon	Mount Lemmon Survey	·	940 m	MPC · JPL
324891	2007 UP_{139}	—	October 24, 2007	Mount Lemmon	Mount Lemmon Survey	·	840 m	MPC · JPL
324892	2007 VD_{15}	—	November 1, 2007	Kitt Peak	Spacewatch	·	700 m	MPC · JPL
324893	2007 VJ_{52}	—	November 1, 2007	Kitt Peak	Spacewatch	·	860 m	MPC · JPL
324894	2007 VP_{54}	—	November 1, 2007	Kitt Peak	Spacewatch	·	800 m	MPC · JPL
324895	2007 VW_{95}	—	November 7, 2007	La Sagra	OAM	·	920 m	MPC · JPL
324896	2007 VL_{103}	—	November 3, 2007	Kitt Peak	Spacewatch	·	660 m	MPC · JPL
324897	2007 VO_{110}	—	November 3, 2007	Kitt Peak	Spacewatch	·	600 m	MPC · JPL
324898	2007 VJ_{122}	—	November 5, 2007	Kitt Peak	Spacewatch	·	1.3 km	MPC · JPL
324899	2007 VU_{126}	—	November 11, 2007	Bisei SG Center	BATTeRS	·	1.1 km	MPC · JPL
324900	2007 VG_{141}	—	November 4, 2007	Kitt Peak	Spacewatch	·	540 m	MPC · JPL

== 324901–325000 ==
back to top

Designation			Discovery			Properties		Ref
Permanent	Provisional	Named after	Date	Site	Discoverer(s)	Category	Diam.	Ref
324901	2007 VJ_{145}	—	November 4, 2007	Kitt Peak	Spacewatch	·	750 m	MPC · JPL
324902	2007 VS_{157}	—	November 5, 2007	Kitt Peak	Spacewatch	·	600 m	MPC · JPL
324903	2007 VU_{183}	—	November 8, 2007	Mount Lemmon	Mount Lemmon Survey	·	1.2 km	MPC · JPL
324904	2007 VU_{192}	—	November 4, 2007	Mount Lemmon	Mount Lemmon Survey	NYS	920 m	MPC · JPL
324905	2007 VD_{207}	—	November 9, 2007	Catalina	CSS	·	730 m	MPC · JPL
324906	2007 VP_{211}	—	November 9, 2007	Kitt Peak	Spacewatch	·	790 m	MPC · JPL
324907	2007 VV_{216}	—	November 9, 2007	Kitt Peak	Spacewatch	·	1.1 km	MPC · JPL
324908	2007 VL_{231}	—	November 7, 2007	Kitt Peak	Spacewatch	·	1.5 km	MPC · JPL
324909	2007 VP_{236}	—	November 11, 2007	Mount Lemmon	Mount Lemmon Survey	·	990 m	MPC · JPL
324910	2007 VX_{237}	—	November 12, 2007	Catalina	CSS	·	920 m	MPC · JPL
324911	2007 VP_{244}	—	November 15, 2007	Socorro	LINEAR	PHO	1.7 km	MPC · JPL
324912	2007 VZ_{244}	—	November 14, 2007	Bisei SG Center	BATTeRS	·	790 m	MPC · JPL
324913	2007 VN_{247}	—	November 13, 2007	Mount Lemmon	Mount Lemmon Survey	·	790 m	MPC · JPL
324914	2007 VB_{252}	—	November 12, 2007	Catalina	CSS	·	700 m	MPC · JPL
324915	2007 VV_{289}	—	November 2, 2007	Kitt Peak	Spacewatch	·	810 m	MPC · JPL
324916	2007 VZ_{290}	—	November 14, 2007	Kitt Peak	Spacewatch	·	930 m	MPC · JPL
324917	2007 VW_{292}	—	November 15, 2007	Catalina	CSS	·	1 km	MPC · JPL
324918	2007 VW_{308}	—	November 8, 2007	Kitt Peak	Spacewatch	·	910 m	MPC · JPL
324919	2007 VC_{309}	—	November 9, 2007	Mount Lemmon	Mount Lemmon Survey	·	750 m	MPC · JPL
324920	2007 VF_{311}	—	November 3, 2007	Kitt Peak	Spacewatch	·	760 m	MPC · JPL
324921	2007 VW_{320}	—	November 2, 2007	Catalina	CSS	·	850 m	MPC · JPL
324922	2007 VS_{326}	—	November 4, 2007	Kitt Peak	Spacewatch	·	750 m	MPC · JPL
324923	2007 VB_{331}	—	November 5, 2007	Mount Lemmon	Mount Lemmon Survey	·	920 m	MPC · JPL
324924	2007 VR_{333}	—	November 11, 2007	Mount Lemmon	Mount Lemmon Survey	NYS	1.2 km	MPC · JPL
324925 Vivantdenon	2007 WO_{1}	Vivantdenon	November 17, 2007	Saint-Sulpice	B. Christophe	·	880 m	MPC · JPL
324926	2007 WW_{1}	—	November 17, 2007	Socorro	LINEAR	·	1.9 km	MPC · JPL
324927	2007 WL_{7}	—	November 18, 2007	Socorro	LINEAR	·	1.0 km	MPC · JPL
324928	2007 WC_{11}	—	August 1, 2000	Cerro Tololo	Deep Ecliptic Survey	·	680 m	MPC · JPL
324929	2007 WE_{21}	—	November 18, 2007	Mount Lemmon	Mount Lemmon Survey	·	1.5 km	MPC · JPL
324930	2007 WJ_{32}	—	October 24, 2007	Mount Lemmon	Mount Lemmon Survey	·	660 m	MPC · JPL
324931	2007 WF_{56}	—	November 30, 2007	Lulin	LUSS	·	1.3 km	MPC · JPL
324932	2007 XC_{1}	—	December 2, 2007	Lulin	LUSS	NYS	960 m	MPC · JPL
324933	2007 XU_{15}	—	December 8, 2007	Bisei SG Center	BATTeRS	·	910 m	MPC · JPL
324934	2007 XZ_{20}	—	December 12, 2007	La Sagra	OAM	·	750 m	MPC · JPL
324935	2007 XC_{21}	—	December 13, 2007	Pla D'Arguines	R. Ferrando	·	830 m	MPC · JPL
324936	2007 XP_{23}	—	December 9, 2007	Bisei SG Center	BATTeRS	NYS	1.0 km	MPC · JPL
324937	2007 XV_{34}	—	December 13, 2007	Socorro	LINEAR	·	850 m	MPC · JPL
324938	2007 XG_{37}	—	December 6, 2007	Kitt Peak	Spacewatch	·	1.0 km	MPC · JPL
324939	2007 XG_{40}	—	December 18, 2007	Kitt Peak	Spacewatch	·	1.1 km	MPC · JPL
324940	2007 XE_{46}	—	December 15, 2007	Catalina	CSS	·	1.0 km	MPC · JPL
324941	2007 XR_{49}	—	December 15, 2007	Kitt Peak	Spacewatch	·	790 m	MPC · JPL
324942	2007 XW_{53}	—	December 5, 2007	Mount Lemmon	Mount Lemmon Survey	NYS	1.3 km	MPC · JPL
324943	2007 XM_{56}	—	December 3, 2007	Kitt Peak	Spacewatch	NYS	1.5 km	MPC · JPL
324944	2007 XQ_{58}	—	April 21, 2009	Mount Lemmon	Mount Lemmon Survey	·	910 m	MPC · JPL
324945	2007 YL_{6}	—	March 12, 2002	Palomar	NEAT	·	650 m	MPC · JPL
324946	2007 YU_{8}	—	December 16, 2007	Mount Lemmon	Mount Lemmon Survey	·	710 m	MPC · JPL
324947	2007 YY_{13}	—	December 17, 2007	Mount Lemmon	Mount Lemmon Survey	·	1.5 km	MPC · JPL
324948	2007 YT_{26}	—	December 18, 2007	Mount Lemmon	Mount Lemmon Survey	·	1.0 km	MPC · JPL
324949	2007 YQ_{28}	—	December 19, 2007	Kitt Peak	Spacewatch	·	790 m	MPC · JPL
324950	2007 YH_{30}	—	December 28, 2007	Kitt Peak	Spacewatch	MAS	720 m	MPC · JPL
324951	2007 YW_{30}	—	December 28, 2007	Kitt Peak	Spacewatch	MAS	660 m	MPC · JPL
324952	2007 YR_{43}	—	December 30, 2007	Kitt Peak	Spacewatch	·	1.5 km	MPC · JPL
324953	2007 YC_{44}	—	December 30, 2007	Mount Lemmon	Mount Lemmon Survey	·	1.3 km	MPC · JPL
324954	2007 YL_{53}	—	December 30, 2007	Mount Lemmon	Mount Lemmon Survey	ERI	1.8 km	MPC · JPL
324955	2007 YE_{54}	—	December 31, 2007	Mount Lemmon	Mount Lemmon Survey	V	720 m	MPC · JPL
324956	2007 YY_{54}	—	December 31, 2007	Catalina	CSS	PHO	1.3 km	MPC · JPL
324957	2007 YG_{57}	—	December 28, 2007	Kitt Peak	Spacewatch	·	970 m	MPC · JPL
324958	2007 YW_{62}	—	December 30, 2007	Mount Lemmon	Mount Lemmon Survey	MAS	630 m	MPC · JPL
324959	2007 YN_{66}	—	December 30, 2007	Kitt Peak	Spacewatch	·	850 m	MPC · JPL
324960	2007 YT_{72}	—	December 19, 2007	Mount Lemmon	Mount Lemmon Survey	·	870 m	MPC · JPL
324961	2007 YV_{72}	—	December 19, 2007	Mount Lemmon	Mount Lemmon Survey	V	840 m	MPC · JPL
324962	2007 YQ_{73}	—	December 30, 2007	Catalina	CSS	·	1.1 km	MPC · JPL
324963	2007 YT_{74}	—	December 31, 2007	Kitt Peak	Spacewatch	·	1.3 km	MPC · JPL
324964	2008 AY_{3}	—	December 4, 2007	Kitt Peak	Spacewatch	·	1.6 km	MPC · JPL
324965	2008 AQ_{4}	—	January 4, 2008	Purple Mountain	PMO NEO Survey Program	·	1.3 km	MPC · JPL
324966	2008 AM_{7}	—	January 10, 2008	Kitt Peak	Spacewatch	·	940 m	MPC · JPL
324967	2008 AC_{15}	—	January 10, 2008	Kitt Peak	Spacewatch	NYS	1.1 km	MPC · JPL
324968	2008 AY_{19}	—	January 10, 2008	Catalina	CSS	NYS	1.2 km	MPC · JPL
324969	2008 AV_{20}	—	January 10, 2008	Mount Lemmon	Mount Lemmon Survey	·	1.2 km	MPC · JPL
324970	2008 AF_{27}	—	January 10, 2008	Catalina	CSS	·	1.5 km	MPC · JPL
324971	2008 AJ_{30}	—	January 11, 2008	Desert Eagle	W. K. Y. Yeung	·	1.1 km	MPC · JPL
324972	2008 AJ_{32}	—	January 7, 2008	La Sagra	OAM	NYS	1.5 km	MPC · JPL
324973	2008 AE_{37}	—	January 10, 2008	Kitt Peak	Spacewatch	·	1.5 km	MPC · JPL
324974	2008 AM_{43}	—	January 10, 2008	Kitt Peak	Spacewatch	·	1.3 km	MPC · JPL
324975	2008 AA_{46}	—	January 11, 2008	Kitt Peak	Spacewatch	·	850 m	MPC · JPL
324976	2008 AH_{56}	—	January 11, 2008	Kitt Peak	Spacewatch	·	1.2 km	MPC · JPL
324977	2008 AH_{58}	—	January 11, 2008	Kitt Peak	Spacewatch	NYS	1.1 km	MPC · JPL
324978	2008 AW_{64}	—	January 11, 2008	Mount Lemmon	Mount Lemmon Survey	·	1.1 km	MPC · JPL
324979	2008 AJ_{71}	—	January 12, 2008	Kitt Peak	Spacewatch	·	1.5 km	MPC · JPL
324980	2008 AS_{75}	—	January 11, 2008	Mount Lemmon	Mount Lemmon Survey	CLA	1.5 km	MPC · JPL
324981	2008 AB_{88}	—	January 13, 2008	Kitt Peak	Spacewatch	·	1.0 km	MPC · JPL
324982	2008 AL_{96}	—	January 14, 2008	Kitt Peak	Spacewatch	·	1.2 km	MPC · JPL
324983	2008 AR_{98}	—	January 14, 2008	Kitt Peak	Spacewatch	·	1.5 km	MPC · JPL
324984	2008 AJ_{107}	—	January 15, 2008	Kitt Peak	Spacewatch	·	1.2 km	MPC · JPL
324985	2008 AQ_{114}	—	January 10, 2008	Kitt Peak	Spacewatch	·	1.5 km	MPC · JPL
324986	2008 AQ_{136}	—	January 13, 2008	Mount Lemmon	Mount Lemmon Survey	·	1.2 km	MPC · JPL
324987	2008 AB_{137}	—	January 15, 2008	Mount Lemmon	Mount Lemmon Survey	·	1.2 km	MPC · JPL
324988	2008 BA_{7}	—	January 16, 2008	Kitt Peak	Spacewatch	·	1.0 km	MPC · JPL
324989	2008 BJ_{7}	—	January 16, 2008	Kitt Peak	Spacewatch	·	1.0 km	MPC · JPL
324990	2008 BW_{9}	—	January 16, 2008	Kitt Peak	Spacewatch	CLA	2.0 km	MPC · JPL
324991	2008 BD_{10}	—	January 16, 2008	Kitt Peak	Spacewatch	·	1.4 km	MPC · JPL
324992	2008 BA_{13}	—	October 10, 2007	Mount Lemmon	Mount Lemmon Survey	·	2.2 km	MPC · JPL
324993	2008 BQ_{13}	—	January 19, 2008	Mount Lemmon	Mount Lemmon Survey	NYS	1.0 km	MPC · JPL
324994	2008 BV_{14}	—	January 28, 2008	Altschwendt	W. Ries	V	580 m	MPC · JPL
324995	2008 BA_{15}	—	November 8, 2007	Mount Lemmon	Mount Lemmon Survey	NYS	910 m	MPC · JPL
324996	2008 BW_{15}	—	January 28, 2008	Lulin	LUSS	·	1.2 km	MPC · JPL
324997	2008 BF_{18}	—	January 30, 2008	Mount Lemmon	Mount Lemmon Survey	NYS	1.3 km	MPC · JPL
324998	2008 BA_{26}	—	January 30, 2008	Kitt Peak	Spacewatch	MAS	670 m	MPC · JPL
324999	2008 BX_{27}	—	January 30, 2008	Catalina	CSS	·	1.1 km	MPC · JPL
325000	2008 BL_{28}	—	January 30, 2008	Mount Lemmon	Mount Lemmon Survey	NYS	1.0 km	MPC · JPL

back to top

== See also ==
- Meanings of minor-planet names: 324001–325000
