= List of minor planets: 323001–324000 =

The following is a partial list of minor planets, running from minor-planet number 323001 through 324000, inclusive. The primary data for this and other partial lists is based on JPL's "Small-Body Orbital Elements" and data available from the Minor Planet Center. Critical list information is also provided by the MPC, unless otherwise specified from Lowell Observatory. A detailed description of the table's columns and additional sources are given on the main page including a complete list of every page in this series, and a statistical break-up on the dynamical classification of minor planets.

Also see the summary list of all named bodies in numerical and alphabetical order, and the corresponding naming citations for the number range of this particular list. New namings may only be added to this list after official publication, as the preannouncement of names is condemned by the Working Group for Small Bodies Nomenclature of the International Astronomical Union.

Near-Earth obj.	MBA (inner)	MBA (outer)	Centaur
Mars-crosser	MBA (middle)	Jupiter trojan	Trans-Neptunian obj.
Unclassified

== 323001–323100 ==
Designation			Discovery			Properties		Ref
Permanent	Provisional	Named after	Date	Site	Discoverer(s)	Category	Diam.	Ref
323001	2002 PM_{52}	—	August 8, 2002	Palomar	NEAT	·	1.1 km	MPC · JPL
323002	2002 PH_{55}	—	August 9, 2002	Socorro	LINEAR	·	3.0 km	MPC · JPL
323003	2002 PK_{67}	—	August 6, 2002	Palomar	NEAT	·	850 m	MPC · JPL
323004	2002 PA_{72}	—	August 12, 2002	Socorro	LINEAR	·	3.1 km	MPC · JPL
323005	2002 PN_{103}	—	August 12, 2002	Socorro	LINEAR	·	3.2 km	MPC · JPL
323006	2002 PA_{116}	—	August 13, 2002	Socorro	LINEAR	·	1.8 km	MPC · JPL
323007	2002 PW_{116}	—	August 14, 2002	Anderson Mesa	LONEOS	·	1.7 km	MPC · JPL
323008	2002 PX_{125}	—	August 14, 2002	Socorro	LINEAR	·	1.5 km	MPC · JPL
323009	2002 PD_{131}	—	August 6, 2002	Palomar	NEAT	·	1.1 km	MPC · JPL
323010	2002 PK_{134}	—	August 14, 2002	Socorro	LINEAR	·	4.0 km	MPC · JPL
323011	2002 PQ_{154}	—	August 12, 2002	Cerro Tololo	M. W. Buie	·	3.3 km	MPC · JPL
323012	2002 PQ_{155}	—	August 8, 2002	Palomar	S. F. Hönig	·	690 m	MPC · JPL
323013	2002 PT_{161}	—	August 8, 2002	Palomar	S. F. Hönig	·	2.5 km	MPC · JPL
323014	2002 PJ_{167}	—	August 8, 2002	Palomar	NEAT	(5)	1.3 km	MPC · JPL
323015	2002 PJ_{169}	—	August 8, 2002	Palomar	NEAT	·	3.7 km	MPC · JPL
323016	2002 PU_{169}	—	August 8, 2002	Palomar	NEAT	·	1.0 km	MPC · JPL
323017	2002 PV_{171}	—	August 8, 2002	Palomar	NEAT	NYS	850 m	MPC · JPL
323018	2002 PN_{175}	—	August 11, 2002	Palomar	NEAT	·	1.3 km	MPC · JPL
323019	2002 PB_{176}	—	August 11, 2002	Palomar	NEAT	·	1.4 km	MPC · JPL
323020	2002 PP_{191}	—	January 11, 2008	Kitt Peak	Spacewatch	·	900 m	MPC · JPL
323021	2002 PC_{193}	—	August 15, 2002	Palomar	NEAT	CYB	4.5 km	MPC · JPL
323022	2002 QV_{4}	—	August 16, 2002	Haleakala	NEAT	·	1.0 km	MPC · JPL
323023	2002 QX_{21}	—	August 27, 2002	Palomar	NEAT	·	1.3 km	MPC · JPL
323024	2002 QV_{23}	—	August 28, 2002	Palomar	NEAT	·	2.9 km	MPC · JPL
323025	2002 QS_{28}	—	August 29, 2002	Palomar	NEAT	·	1.3 km	MPC · JPL
323026	2002 QT_{47}	—	August 31, 2002	Palomar	NEAT	·	1.3 km	MPC · JPL
323027	2002 QG_{66}	—	August 29, 2002	Palomar	NEAT	·	5.7 km	MPC · JPL
323028	2002 QP_{72}	—	August 29, 2002	Palomar	NEAT	·	1.5 km	MPC · JPL
323029	2002 QY_{96}	—	August 18, 2002	Palomar	NEAT	·	3.0 km	MPC · JPL
323030	2002 QN_{104}	—	August 17, 2002	Palomar	NEAT	·	910 m	MPC · JPL
323031	2002 QV_{108}	—	August 17, 2002	Palomar	NEAT	NYS	920 m	MPC · JPL
323032	2002 QY_{109}	—	August 17, 2002	Palomar	NEAT	·	1.4 km	MPC · JPL
323033	2002 QO_{116}	—	August 18, 2002	Palomar	NEAT	CYB	4.4 km	MPC · JPL
323034	2002 QW_{129}	—	August 17, 2002	Palomar	NEAT	·	1.2 km	MPC · JPL
323035	2002 QX_{130}	—	January 11, 2008	Kitt Peak	Spacewatch	V	650 m	MPC · JPL
323036	2002 RY_{3}	—	September 2, 2002	Palomar	NEAT	·	3.6 km	MPC · JPL
323037	2002 RS_{13}	—	September 4, 2002	Anderson Mesa	LONEOS	·	1.5 km	MPC · JPL
323038	2002 RH_{22}	—	September 4, 2002	Anderson Mesa	LONEOS	·	3.5 km	MPC · JPL
323039	2002 RF_{29}	—	September 3, 2002	Haleakala	NEAT	·	3.9 km	MPC · JPL
323040	2002 RP_{30}	—	September 4, 2002	Anderson Mesa	LONEOS	·	1.5 km	MPC · JPL
323041	2002 RF_{35}	—	September 4, 2002	Anderson Mesa	LONEOS	PHO	1.0 km	MPC · JPL
323042	2002 RQ_{45}	—	September 5, 2002	Socorro	LINEAR	NYS	1.3 km	MPC · JPL
323043	2002 RK_{56}	—	September 5, 2002	Anderson Mesa	LONEOS	·	1.8 km	MPC · JPL
323044	2002 RT_{67}	—	September 3, 2002	Palomar	NEAT	·	7.4 km	MPC · JPL
323045	2002 RT_{89}	—	September 5, 2002	Socorro	LINEAR	·	1.5 km	MPC · JPL
323046	2002 RH_{91}	—	September 5, 2002	Socorro	LINEAR	ERI	2.0 km	MPC · JPL
323047	2002 RR_{140}	—	September 12, 2002	Haleakala	NEAT	·	1.9 km	MPC · JPL
323048	2002 RP_{143}	—	September 11, 2002	Palomar	NEAT	·	650 m	MPC · JPL
323049	2002 RN_{169}	—	September 13, 2002	Palomar	NEAT	·	1.4 km	MPC · JPL
323050	2002 RF_{180}	—	September 14, 2002	Kitt Peak	Spacewatch	·	1.3 km	MPC · JPL
323051	2002 RP_{180}	—	September 14, 2002	Palomar	NEAT	·	1.1 km	MPC · JPL
323052	2002 RW_{190}	—	September 13, 2002	Socorro	LINEAR	PHO	1.1 km	MPC · JPL
323053	2002 RS_{193}	—	September 12, 2002	Palomar	NEAT	·	3.0 km	MPC · JPL
323054	2002 RM_{194}	—	September 12, 2002	Palomar	NEAT	·	830 m	MPC · JPL
323055	2002 RU_{201}	—	September 13, 2002	Socorro	LINEAR	NYS	1.1 km	MPC · JPL
323056	2002 RJ_{219}	—	September 15, 2002	Palomar	NEAT	NYS	1.3 km	MPC · JPL
323057	2002 RB_{254}	—	September 14, 2002	Palomar	NEAT	PHO	2.7 km	MPC · JPL
323058	2002 RZ_{267}	—	September 4, 2002	Palomar	NEAT	·	1.0 km	MPC · JPL
323059	2002 SZ_{4}	—	September 27, 2002	Palomar	NEAT	V	800 m	MPC · JPL
323060	2002 SV_{31}	—	September 28, 2002	Haleakala	NEAT	(5)	1.0 km	MPC · JPL
323061	2002 SU_{38}	—	September 30, 2002	Socorro	LINEAR	NYS	1.2 km	MPC · JPL
323062	2002 SU_{39}	—	September 30, 2002	Haleakala	NEAT	·	1.4 km	MPC · JPL
323063	2002 SP_{45}	—	September 29, 2002	Kitt Peak	Spacewatch	·	2.2 km	MPC · JPL
323064	2002 SK_{51}	—	September 16, 2002	Palomar	NEAT	·	1.2 km	MPC · JPL
323065	2002 ST_{66}	—	September 16, 2002	Palomar	NEAT	·	3.9 km	MPC · JPL
323066	2002 TT_{5}	—	October 1, 2002	Anderson Mesa	LONEOS	·	1.4 km	MPC · JPL
323067	2002 TU_{19}	—	October 2, 2002	Socorro	LINEAR	·	1.2 km	MPC · JPL
323068	2002 TS_{54}	—	October 2, 2002	Socorro	LINEAR	CYB	5.4 km	MPC · JPL
323069	2002 TF_{57}	—	October 3, 2002	Socorro	LINEAR	H	620 m	MPC · JPL
323070	2002 TT_{78}	—	October 1, 2002	Haleakala	NEAT	·	2.6 km	MPC · JPL
323071	2002 TV_{88}	—	October 3, 2002	Palomar	NEAT	·	1.8 km	MPC · JPL
323072	2002 TB_{94}	—	October 3, 2002	Socorro	LINEAR	·	1.3 km	MPC · JPL
323073	2002 TJ_{96}	—	October 4, 2002	Palomar	NEAT	H	700 m	MPC · JPL
323074	2002 TS_{96}	—	October 10, 2002	Uccle	Uccle	NYS	1.6 km	MPC · JPL
323075	2002 TB_{103}	—	October 4, 2002	Socorro	LINEAR	PHO	1.1 km	MPC · JPL
323076	2002 TL_{106}	—	October 4, 2002	Palomar	NEAT	·	1.3 km	MPC · JPL
323077	2002 TR_{112}	—	October 3, 2002	Palomar	NEAT	EUN	1.5 km	MPC · JPL
323078	2002 TB_{116}	—	October 3, 2002	Palomar	NEAT	·	1.5 km	MPC · JPL
323079	2002 TW_{129}	—	October 4, 2002	Palomar	NEAT	PHO	1.3 km	MPC · JPL
323080	2002 TK_{146}	—	October 4, 2002	Socorro	LINEAR	EUN	1.2 km	MPC · JPL
323081	2002 TE_{175}	—	October 4, 2002	Socorro	LINEAR	·	1.7 km	MPC · JPL
323082	2002 TJ_{182}	—	October 4, 2002	Palomar	NEAT	·	1.4 km	MPC · JPL
323083	2002 TQ_{261}	—	October 9, 2002	Kitt Peak	Spacewatch	·	1.4 km	MPC · JPL
323084	2002 TL_{281}	—	October 10, 2002	Socorro	LINEAR	H	740 m	MPC · JPL
323085	2002 TZ_{323}	—	October 5, 2002	Apache Point	SDSS	·	1.3 km	MPC · JPL
323086	2002 TJ_{325}	—	October 5, 2002	Apache Point	SDSS	·	1.1 km	MPC · JPL
323087	2002 TB_{387}	—	February 1, 2008	Mount Lemmon	Mount Lemmon Survey	V	920 m	MPC · JPL
323088	2002 UX_{54}	—	October 29, 2002	Apache Point	SDSS	·	1.5 km	MPC · JPL
323089	2002 VT_{20}	—	November 5, 2002	Socorro	LINEAR	·	1.2 km	MPC · JPL
323090	2002 VP_{21}	—	November 5, 2002	Socorro	LINEAR	·	1.2 km	MPC · JPL
323091	2002 VL_{26}	—	November 5, 2002	Socorro	LINEAR	(5)	1.2 km	MPC · JPL
323092	2002 VR_{35}	—	November 5, 2002	Socorro	LINEAR	·	1.7 km	MPC · JPL
323093	2002 VM_{42}	—	November 5, 2002	Palomar	NEAT	·	1.3 km	MPC · JPL
323094	2002 VS_{46}	—	November 5, 2002	Palomar	NEAT	(5)	1.4 km	MPC · JPL
323095	2002 VP_{82}	—	November 7, 2002	Socorro	LINEAR	·	1.9 km	MPC · JPL
323096	2002 VE_{102}	—	November 11, 2002	Kvistaberg	Uppsala-DLR Asteroid Survey	·	1.9 km	MPC · JPL
323097	2002 VA_{114}	—	November 13, 2002	Palomar	NEAT	·	2.6 km	MPC · JPL
323098	2002 VF_{145}	—	May 14, 2005	Mount Lemmon	Mount Lemmon Survey	·	1.2 km	MPC · JPL
323099	2002 WC_{9}	—	November 24, 2002	Palomar	NEAT	·	1.7 km	MPC · JPL
323100	2002 WR_{22}	—	November 24, 2002	Palomar	NEAT	·	1.6 km	MPC · JPL

== 323101–323200 ==
back to top

Designation			Discovery			Properties		Ref
Permanent	Provisional	Named after	Date	Site	Discoverer(s)	Category	Diam.	Ref
323101	2002 XE_{5}	—	December 2, 2002	Socorro	LINEAR	·	2.4 km	MPC · JPL
323102	2002 XD_{10}	—	December 2, 2002	Haleakala	NEAT	·	1.4 km	MPC · JPL
323103	2002 XR_{25}	—	December 5, 2002	Socorro	LINEAR	(5)	1.1 km	MPC · JPL
323104	2002 XJ_{36}	—	December 5, 2002	Haleakala	NEAT	·	1.7 km	MPC · JPL
323105	2002 YW_{5}	—	December 27, 2002	Anderson Mesa	LONEOS	(1547)	2.1 km	MPC · JPL
323106	2002 YM_{6}	—	December 28, 2002	Anderson Mesa	LONEOS	·	2.8 km	MPC · JPL
323107	2002 YW_{7}	—	December 30, 2002	Bohyunsan	Jeon, Y.-B., Lee, B.-C.	(5)	1.3 km	MPC · JPL
323108	2002 YV_{8}	—	December 31, 2002	Socorro	LINEAR	·	2.2 km	MPC · JPL
323109	2002 YR_{20}	—	December 31, 2002	Socorro	LINEAR	EUN	1.4 km	MPC · JPL
323110	2002 YO_{28}	—	December 31, 2002	Socorro	LINEAR	·	1.9 km	MPC · JPL
323111	2002 YL_{29}	—	December 31, 2002	Socorro	LINEAR	·	1.7 km	MPC · JPL
323112	2002 YS_{31}	—	December 31, 2002	Socorro	LINEAR	·	2.5 km	MPC · JPL
323113	2003 AS	—	January 1, 2003	Socorro	LINEAR	JUN	1.5 km	MPC · JPL
323114	2003 AK_{13}	—	January 1, 2003	Socorro	LINEAR	·	2.1 km	MPC · JPL
323115	2003 AG_{16}	—	January 4, 2003	Socorro	LINEAR	·	2.4 km	MPC · JPL
323116	2003 AP_{23}	—	January 4, 2003	Socorro	LINEAR	·	1.6 km	MPC · JPL
323117	2003 AF_{32}	—	January 5, 2003	Socorro	LINEAR	·	1.4 km	MPC · JPL
323118	2003 AQ_{36}	—	January 7, 2003	Socorro	LINEAR	·	1.9 km	MPC · JPL
323119	2003 AB_{38}	—	January 7, 2003	Socorro	LINEAR	·	2.0 km	MPC · JPL
323120	2003 AF_{46}	—	January 5, 2003	Socorro	LINEAR	ADE	3.4 km	MPC · JPL
323121	2003 AE_{59}	—	January 5, 2003	Socorro	LINEAR	(1547)	2.9 km	MPC · JPL
323122	2003 AC_{61}	—	January 7, 2003	Socorro	LINEAR	·	1.4 km	MPC · JPL
323123	2003 AJ_{68}	—	January 8, 2003	Socorro	LINEAR	·	2.1 km	MPC · JPL
323124	2003 AL_{71}	—	January 10, 2003	Kitt Peak	Spacewatch	·	1.4 km	MPC · JPL
323125	2003 AT_{84}	—	January 10, 2003	Socorro	LINEAR	RAF	1.5 km	MPC · JPL
323126	2003 BU_{4}	—	January 24, 2003	La Silla	A. Boattini, H. Scholl	·	1.8 km	MPC · JPL
323127	2003 BP_{16}	—	January 26, 2003	Haleakala	NEAT	·	2.2 km	MPC · JPL
323128	2003 BZ_{21}	—	January 27, 2003	Palomar	NEAT	·	2.4 km	MPC · JPL
323129	2003 BH_{23}	—	January 25, 2003	Palomar	NEAT	JUN	1.1 km	MPC · JPL
323130	2003 BK_{43}	—	January 27, 2003	Socorro	LINEAR	·	1.8 km	MPC · JPL
323131	2003 BC_{55}	—	January 27, 2003	Haleakala	NEAT	·	2.7 km	MPC · JPL
323132	2003 BQ_{68}	—	January 28, 2003	Kitt Peak	Spacewatch	·	1.8 km	MPC · JPL
323133	2003 BB_{72}	—	January 28, 2003	Socorro	LINEAR	JUN	1.6 km	MPC · JPL
323134	2003 BJ_{75}	—	January 29, 2003	Palomar	NEAT	·	1.6 km	MPC · JPL
323135	2003 BN_{75}	—	January 29, 2003	Palomar	NEAT	·	2.5 km	MPC · JPL
323136	2003 BE_{76}	—	January 29, 2003	Palomar	NEAT	·	1.9 km	MPC · JPL
323137	2003 BM_{80}	—	January 31, 2003	Anderson Mesa	LONEOS	T_{j} (2.99) · Comet (282P)	10 km	MPC · JPL
323138	2003 BU_{92}	—	January 26, 2003	Palomar	NEAT	·	1.8 km	MPC · JPL
323139	2003 CG_{1}	—	February 1, 2003	Socorro	LINEAR	(1547)	2.7 km	MPC · JPL
323140	2003 CO_{7}	—	February 1, 2003	Socorro	LINEAR	·	1.7 km	MPC · JPL
323141	2003 DC_{3}	—	February 22, 2003	Desert Eagle	W. K. Y. Yeung	·	2.7 km	MPC · JPL
323142	2003 DB_{4}	—	February 22, 2003	Palomar	NEAT	·	2.6 km	MPC · JPL
323143	2003 DG_{14}	—	February 26, 2003	Socorro	LINEAR	·	3.6 km	MPC · JPL
323144	2003 DT_{17}	—	February 27, 2003	Haleakala	NEAT	·	2.9 km	MPC · JPL
323145	2003 DS_{24}	—	September 28, 2001	Palomar	NEAT	·	2.2 km	MPC · JPL
323146	2003 EF_{15}	—	March 7, 2003	Socorro	LINEAR	·	2.6 km	MPC · JPL
323147	2003 ER_{18}	—	March 6, 2003	Anderson Mesa	LONEOS	·	3.2 km	MPC · JPL
323148	2003 EB_{27}	—	February 23, 2003	Anderson Mesa	LONEOS	·	1.5 km	MPC · JPL
323149	2003 EC_{40}	—	March 8, 2003	Socorro	LINEAR	·	2.8 km	MPC · JPL
323150	2003 EL_{59}	—	March 10, 2003	Palomar	NEAT	·	2.3 km	MPC · JPL
323151	2003 EE_{63}	—	March 12, 2003	Palomar	NEAT	·	2.5 km	MPC · JPL
323152	2003 EL_{63}	—	March 9, 2003	Palomar	NEAT	EUN	1.6 km	MPC · JPL
323153	2003 EM_{63}	—	March 9, 2003	Palomar	NEAT	·	2.2 km	MPC · JPL
323154	2003 FD	—	March 22, 2003	Palomar	NEAT	HNS	1.6 km	MPC · JPL
323155	2003 FH_{20}	—	March 23, 2003	Palomar	NEAT	·	2.6 km	MPC · JPL
323156	2003 FM_{20}	—	March 23, 2003	Palomar	NEAT	JUN	1.3 km	MPC · JPL
323157	2003 FG_{27}	—	March 24, 2003	Kitt Peak	Spacewatch	·	1.9 km	MPC · JPL
323158	2003 FB_{50}	—	March 24, 2003	Haleakala	NEAT	·	2.6 km	MPC · JPL
323159	2003 FH_{51}	—	March 25, 2003	Palomar	NEAT	·	1.9 km	MPC · JPL
323160	2003 FB_{56}	—	March 26, 2003	Palomar	NEAT	·	2.1 km	MPC · JPL
323161	2003 FW_{67}	—	March 26, 2003	Kitt Peak	Spacewatch	GEF	2.0 km	MPC · JPL
323162	2003 FB_{69}	—	March 26, 2003	Kitt Peak	Spacewatch	EUN	1.5 km	MPC · JPL
323163	2003 FE_{78}	—	March 10, 2003	Anderson Mesa	LONEOS	·	1.7 km	MPC · JPL
323164	2003 FZ_{91}	—	March 29, 2003	Anderson Mesa	LONEOS	·	2.4 km	MPC · JPL
323165	2003 FZ_{93}	—	March 29, 2003	Anderson Mesa	LONEOS	·	3.2 km	MPC · JPL
323166	2003 FN_{94}	—	March 29, 2003	Anderson Mesa	LONEOS	·	3.4 km	MPC · JPL
323167	2003 FD_{95}	—	March 30, 2003	Anderson Mesa	LONEOS	·	1.9 km	MPC · JPL
323168	2003 FO_{117}	—	March 25, 2003	Palomar	NEAT	·	2.4 km	MPC · JPL
323169	2003 FV_{126}	—	March 31, 2003	Kitt Peak	Spacewatch	·	2.1 km	MPC · JPL
323170	2003 GU_{3}	—	April 1, 2003	Socorro	LINEAR	JUN	1.7 km	MPC · JPL
323171	2003 GK_{10}	—	April 2, 2003	Haleakala	NEAT	·	3.0 km	MPC · JPL
323172	2003 GL_{10}	—	April 2, 2003	Haleakala	NEAT	·	2.3 km	MPC · JPL
323173	2003 GC_{13}	—	April 1, 2003	Socorro	LINEAR	·	4.1 km	MPC · JPL
323174	2003 GY_{19}	—	April 5, 2003	Kitt Peak	Spacewatch	·	1.8 km	MPC · JPL
323175	2003 GY_{22}	—	April 3, 2003	Anderson Mesa	LONEOS	·	2.6 km	MPC · JPL
323176	2003 GA_{27}	—	April 5, 2003	Kitt Peak	Spacewatch	·	2.4 km	MPC · JPL
323177	2003 GH_{35}	—	April 4, 2003	Kitt Peak	Spacewatch	·	2.9 km	MPC · JPL
323178	2003 HT_{1}	—	April 23, 2003	Campo Imperatore	CINEOS	·	3.6 km	MPC · JPL
323179	2003 HR_{32}	—	April 29, 2003	Haleakala	NEAT	APO +1km	1.2 km	MPC · JPL
323180	2003 HZ_{32}	—	April 28, 2003	Socorro	LINEAR	·	3.0 km	MPC · JPL
323181	2003 KC_{13}	—	May 27, 2003	Kitt Peak	Spacewatch	GEF	1.4 km	MPC · JPL
323182	2003 MQ_{5}	—	June 26, 2003	Socorro	LINEAR	PHO	1.7 km	MPC · JPL
323183	2003 NJ	—	April 20, 1993	Kitt Peak	Spacewatch	·	720 m	MPC · JPL
323184	2003 NT_{4}	—	July 5, 2003	Haleakala	NEAT	·	3.1 km	MPC · JPL
323185	2003 NW_{12}	—	July 4, 2003	Kitt Peak	Spacewatch	·	2.6 km	MPC · JPL
323186	2003 OE_{16}	—	July 24, 2003	Wise	Wise	EOS	2.8 km	MPC · JPL
323187	2003 OV_{27}	—	July 24, 2003	Palomar	NEAT	TIR	3.8 km	MPC · JPL
323188	2003 ON_{33}	—	July 25, 2003	Palomar	NEAT	(2076)	1.3 km	MPC · JPL
323189	2003 QJ_{1}	—	August 19, 2003	Campo Imperatore	CINEOS	·	930 m	MPC · JPL
323190	2003 QL_{10}	—	August 21, 2003	Socorro	LINEAR	·	5.6 km	MPC · JPL
323191	2003 QC_{15}	—	August 20, 2003	Palomar	NEAT	·	2.3 km	MPC · JPL
323192	2003 QP_{16}	—	August 20, 2003	Campo Imperatore	CINEOS	·	3.8 km	MPC · JPL
323193	2003 QP_{35}	—	August 22, 2003	Socorro	LINEAR	·	5.5 km	MPC · JPL
323194	2003 QA_{45}	—	July 23, 2003	Palomar	NEAT	·	880 m	MPC · JPL
323195	2003 QS_{48}	—	August 21, 2003	Palomar	NEAT	·	4.8 km	MPC · JPL
323196	2003 QB_{68}	—	August 25, 2003	Socorro	LINEAR	·	940 m	MPC · JPL
323197	2003 QU_{70}	—	August 23, 2003	Palomar	NEAT	·	4.1 km	MPC · JPL
323198	2003 QQ_{74}	—	August 24, 2003	Socorro	LINEAR	·	740 m	MPC · JPL
323199	2003 QV_{75}	—	August 24, 2003	Socorro	LINEAR	·	3.5 km	MPC · JPL
323200	2003 QT_{104}	—	August 29, 2003	Socorro	LINEAR	·	900 m	MPC · JPL

== 323201–323300 ==
back to top

Designation			Discovery			Properties		Ref
Permanent	Provisional	Named after	Date	Site	Discoverer(s)	Category	Diam.	Ref
323201	2003 QF_{120}	—	August 28, 2003	Palomar	NEAT	·	3.3 km	MPC · JPL
323202	2003 RS_{18}	—	September 15, 2003	Anderson Mesa	LONEOS	·	1.2 km	MPC · JPL
323203	2003 RS_{19}	—	September 15, 2003	Anderson Mesa	LONEOS	·	740 m	MPC · JPL
323204	2003 RY_{22}	—	September 15, 2003	Palomar	NEAT	(895)	7.5 km	MPC · JPL
323205	2003 SY	—	September 16, 2003	Kitt Peak	Spacewatch	·	3.7 km	MPC · JPL
323206	2003 SB_{2}	—	September 16, 2003	Kitt Peak	Spacewatch	V	670 m	MPC · JPL
323207	2003 SP_{2}	—	September 16, 2003	Kitt Peak	Spacewatch	·	700 m	MPC · JPL
323208	2003 SL_{10}	—	September 17, 2003	Kitt Peak	Spacewatch	·	4.5 km	MPC · JPL
323209	2003 SG_{13}	—	September 16, 2003	Kitt Peak	Spacewatch	TIR	3.7 km	MPC · JPL
323210	2003 SO_{25}	—	September 17, 2003	Kitt Peak	Spacewatch	·	930 m	MPC · JPL
323211	2003 SZ_{26}	—	September 18, 2003	Palomar	NEAT	·	3.5 km	MPC · JPL
323212	2003 SN_{30}	—	September 18, 2003	Kitt Peak	Spacewatch	·	4.0 km	MPC · JPL
323213	2003 SP_{36}	—	September 17, 2003	Kitt Peak	Spacewatch	·	4.9 km	MPC · JPL
323214	2003 SE_{38}	—	September 16, 2003	Palomar	NEAT	·	2.1 km	MPC · JPL
323215	2003 SO_{38}	—	September 16, 2003	Palomar	NEAT	·	1.2 km	MPC · JPL
323216	2003 ST_{39}	—	September 16, 2003	Palomar	NEAT	PHO	1.9 km	MPC · JPL
323217	2003 SD_{44}	—	September 16, 2003	Anderson Mesa	LONEOS	·	1.2 km	MPC · JPL
323218	2003 SL_{54}	—	September 16, 2003	Anderson Mesa	LONEOS	(2076)	1.4 km	MPC · JPL
323219	2003 SS_{71}	—	September 18, 2003	Kitt Peak	Spacewatch	·	820 m	MPC · JPL
323220	2003 SJ_{78}	—	September 19, 2003	Kitt Peak	Spacewatch	·	3.7 km	MPC · JPL
323221	2003 SC_{79}	—	September 19, 2003	Kitt Peak	Spacewatch	·	3.9 km	MPC · JPL
323222	2003 SD_{84}	—	September 19, 2003	Kitt Peak	Spacewatch	·	1.1 km	MPC · JPL
323223	2003 SH_{86}	—	September 16, 2003	Palomar	NEAT	V	810 m	MPC · JPL
323224	2003 SX_{95}	—	September 19, 2003	Palomar	NEAT	·	4.0 km	MPC · JPL
323225	2003 SN_{98}	—	September 19, 2003	Kitt Peak	Spacewatch	V	870 m	MPC · JPL
323226	2003 SY_{111}	—	September 18, 2003	Goodricke-Pigott	R. A. Tucker	·	3.4 km	MPC · JPL
323227	2003 SG_{113}	—	September 16, 2003	Kitt Peak	Spacewatch	·	4.3 km	MPC · JPL
323228	2003 SF_{123}	—	September 18, 2003	Socorro	LINEAR	·	4.0 km	MPC · JPL
323229	2003 SW_{139}	—	September 18, 2003	Kitt Peak	Spacewatch	·	2.7 km	MPC · JPL
323230	2003 SJ_{146}	—	September 20, 2003	Palomar	NEAT	·	1.6 km	MPC · JPL
323231	2003 SK_{154}	—	September 19, 2003	Anderson Mesa	LONEOS	·	1.1 km	MPC · JPL
323232	2003 SB_{156}	—	September 19, 2003	Anderson Mesa	LONEOS	·	4.5 km	MPC · JPL
323233	2003 ST_{158}	—	September 19, 2003	Socorro	LINEAR	ARM	4.8 km	MPC · JPL
323234	2003 SM_{168}	—	September 23, 2003	Haleakala	NEAT	·	880 m	MPC · JPL
323235	2003 SX_{171}	—	September 18, 2003	Kitt Peak	Spacewatch	·	830 m	MPC · JPL
323236	2003 SA_{172}	—	September 18, 2003	Socorro	LINEAR	·	860 m	MPC · JPL
323237	2003 SB_{174}	—	September 18, 2003	Palomar	NEAT	·	2.9 km	MPC · JPL
323238	2003 SO_{176}	—	September 18, 2003	Palomar	NEAT	·	1.4 km	MPC · JPL
323239	2003 SO_{178}	—	September 19, 2003	Kitt Peak	Spacewatch	·	3.7 km	MPC · JPL
323240	2003 SC_{188}	—	September 22, 2003	Socorro	LINEAR	·	1.2 km	MPC · JPL
323241	2003 SH_{189}	—	September 22, 2003	Anderson Mesa	LONEOS	·	1 km	MPC · JPL
323242	2003 SQ_{194}	—	September 20, 2003	Palomar	NEAT	·	3.8 km	MPC · JPL
323243	2003 SO_{201}	—	September 23, 2003	Emerald Lane	L. Ball	·	800 m	MPC · JPL
323244	2003 SK_{205}	—	September 23, 2003	Haleakala	NEAT	·	3.4 km	MPC · JPL
323245	2003 SA_{227}	—	September 27, 2003	Kitt Peak	Spacewatch	·	2.9 km	MPC · JPL
323246	2003 SD_{228}	—	September 27, 2003	Socorro	LINEAR	·	5.4 km	MPC · JPL
323247	2003 SN_{230}	—	September 24, 2003	Palomar	NEAT	V	890 m	MPC · JPL
323248	2003 SA_{233}	—	September 25, 2003	Palomar	NEAT	·	3.5 km	MPC · JPL
323249	2003 SG_{233}	—	September 25, 2003	Palomar	NEAT	·	930 m	MPC · JPL
323250	2003 SZ_{233}	—	September 25, 2003	Palomar	NEAT	EOS	2.4 km	MPC · JPL
323251	2003 SL_{237}	—	September 26, 2003	Socorro	LINEAR	·	1.1 km	MPC · JPL
323252	2003 SR_{238}	—	September 27, 2003	Socorro	LINEAR	EOS	2.6 km	MPC · JPL
323253	2003 SM_{244}	—	September 25, 2003	Haleakala	NEAT	·	3.7 km	MPC · JPL
323254	2003 SY_{253}	—	September 18, 2003	Kitt Peak	Spacewatch	·	980 m	MPC · JPL
323255	2003 SQ_{260}	—	September 27, 2003	Kitt Peak	Spacewatch	HYG	2.4 km	MPC · JPL
323256	2003 SG_{268}	—	September 29, 2003	Kitt Peak	Spacewatch	V	600 m	MPC · JPL
323257	2003 SW_{272}	—	September 27, 2003	Socorro	LINEAR	·	4.0 km	MPC · JPL
323258	2003 SX_{279}	—	September 18, 2003	Kitt Peak	Spacewatch	·	2.0 km	MPC · JPL
323259	2003 SP_{285}	—	September 20, 2003	Kitt Peak	Spacewatch	(2076)	850 m	MPC · JPL
323260	2003 SK_{315}	—	September 28, 2003	Anderson Mesa	LONEOS	·	4.1 km	MPC · JPL
323261	2003 SW_{321}	—	September 26, 2003	Apache Point	SDSS	EOS	2.3 km	MPC · JPL
323262	2003 SB_{323}	—	September 16, 2003	Kitt Peak	Spacewatch	·	3.4 km	MPC · JPL
323263	2003 SD_{325}	—	September 17, 2003	Kitt Peak	Spacewatch	·	710 m	MPC · JPL
323264	2003 SS_{325}	—	September 18, 2003	Kitt Peak	Spacewatch	·	3.5 km	MPC · JPL
323265	2003 SL_{327}	—	September 18, 2003	Kitt Peak	Spacewatch	·	3.0 km	MPC · JPL
323266	2003 SZ_{327}	—	September 19, 2003	Campo Imperatore	CINEOS	EOS	2.6 km	MPC · JPL
323267	2003 SX_{334}	—	September 26, 2003	Apache Point	SDSS	V	570 m	MPC · JPL
323268	2003 SD_{337}	—	September 28, 2003	Apache Point	SDSS	·	3.2 km	MPC · JPL
323269	2003 SY_{337}	—	September 21, 2003	Palomar	NEAT	·	660 m	MPC · JPL
323270	2003 SA_{346}	—	September 18, 2003	Palomar	NEAT	EOS	2.2 km	MPC · JPL
323271	2003 SW_{363}	—	September 20, 2003	Kitt Peak	Spacewatch	·	800 m	MPC · JPL
323272	2003 SW_{365}	—	September 26, 2003	Apache Point	SDSS	·	920 m	MPC · JPL
323273	2003 SN_{379}	—	September 26, 2003	Apache Point	SDSS	·	750 m	MPC · JPL
323274	2003 SQ_{390}	—	September 26, 2003	Apache Point	SDSS	VER	3.4 km	MPC · JPL
323275	2003 SK_{403}	—	September 27, 2003	Kitt Peak	Spacewatch	·	2.7 km	MPC · JPL
323276	2003 SB_{410}	—	September 28, 2003	Apache Point	SDSS	·	2.4 km	MPC · JPL
323277	2003 SP_{427}	—	September 18, 2003	Kitt Peak	Spacewatch	·	4.1 km	MPC · JPL
323278	2003 SR_{429}	—	September 28, 2003	Anderson Mesa	LONEOS	·	3.9 km	MPC · JPL
323279	2003 SW_{429}	—	September 28, 2003	Kitt Peak	Spacewatch	·	670 m	MPC · JPL
323280	2003 SB_{430}	—	September 29, 2003	Kitt Peak	Spacewatch	·	4.1 km	MPC · JPL
323281	2003 SP_{431}	—	September 19, 2003	Kitt Peak	Spacewatch	·	800 m	MPC · JPL
323282	2003 SJ_{432}	—	March 3, 2001	Kitt Peak	Spacewatch	EOS	2.2 km	MPC · JPL
323283	2003 SQ_{432}	—	September 19, 2003	Kitt Peak	Spacewatch	·	4.2 km	MPC · JPL
323284	2003 SU_{432}	—	September 20, 2003	Campo Imperatore	CINEOS	EOS ·	4.7 km	MPC · JPL
323285	2003 TC_{1}	—	October 4, 2003	Kingsnake	J. V. McClusky	·	6.2 km	MPC · JPL
323286	2003 TB_{9}	—	October 3, 2003	Haleakala	NEAT	·	1.1 km	MPC · JPL
323287	2003 TR_{11}	—	October 14, 2003	Anderson Mesa	LONEOS	·	3.8 km	MPC · JPL
323288	2003 TC_{14}	—	October 15, 2003	Anderson Mesa	LONEOS	·	1.1 km	MPC · JPL
323289	2003 TU_{18}	—	October 15, 2003	Anderson Mesa	LONEOS	·	1.3 km	MPC · JPL
323290	2003 TU_{19}	—	October 15, 2003	Anderson Mesa	LONEOS	·	1.3 km	MPC · JPL
323291	2003 TJ_{20}	—	October 14, 2003	Palomar	NEAT	·	1.2 km	MPC · JPL
323292	2003 TT_{25}	—	October 1, 2003	Kitt Peak	Spacewatch	·	940 m	MPC · JPL
323293	2003 TZ_{37}	—	September 21, 2003	Kitt Peak	Spacewatch	VER ·	3.1 km	MPC · JPL
323294	2003 TN_{41}	—	October 2, 2003	Kitt Peak	Spacewatch	·	920 m	MPC · JPL
323295	2003 TC_{53}	—	October 5, 2003	Kitt Peak	Spacewatch	·	700 m	MPC · JPL
323296	2003 UV_{5}	—	October 18, 2003	Palomar	NEAT	·	1.2 km	MPC · JPL
323297	2003 UX_{7}	—	October 18, 2003	Kleť	Kleť	·	3.6 km	MPC · JPL
323298	2003 UT_{12}	—	October 17, 2003	Bergisch Gladbach	W. Bickel	·	990 m	MPC · JPL
323299	2003 UE_{17}	—	October 17, 2003	Kitt Peak	Spacewatch	·	1.4 km	MPC · JPL
323300	2003 UD_{22}	—	October 23, 2003	Socorro	LINEAR	APO	420 m	MPC · JPL

== 323301–323400 ==
back to top

Designation			Discovery			Properties		Ref
Permanent	Provisional	Named after	Date	Site	Discoverer(s)	Category	Diam.	Ref
323301	2003 UG_{23}	—	October 22, 2003	Kvistaberg	Uppsala-DLR Asteroid Survey	·	1.0 km	MPC · JPL
323302	2003 UF_{29}	—	October 23, 2003	Kvistaberg	Uppsala-DLR Asteroid Survey	MAS	820 m	MPC · JPL
323303	2003 UZ_{34}	—	October 22, 2003	Kitt Peak	Spacewatch	·	810 m	MPC · JPL
323304	2003 UA_{35}	—	October 24, 2003	Socorro	LINEAR	·	1.1 km	MPC · JPL
323305	2003 UE_{62}	—	October 16, 2003	Anderson Mesa	LONEOS	·	1.1 km	MPC · JPL
323306	2003 UU_{72}	—	October 19, 2003	Kitt Peak	Spacewatch	·	860 m	MPC · JPL
323307	2003 UF_{81}	—	October 16, 2003	Anderson Mesa	LONEOS	·	1.4 km	MPC · JPL
323308	2003 UH_{81}	—	October 16, 2003	Anderson Mesa	LONEOS	·	1.3 km	MPC · JPL
323309	2003 UK_{95}	—	October 18, 2003	Haleakala	NEAT	·	1.1 km	MPC · JPL
323310	2003 UQ_{95}	—	September 29, 2003	Socorro	LINEAR	·	840 m	MPC · JPL
323311	2003 UZ_{95}	—	October 18, 2003	Kitt Peak	Spacewatch	·	4.7 km	MPC · JPL
323312	2003 UT_{96}	—	October 19, 2003	Kitt Peak	Spacewatch	·	4.5 km	MPC · JPL
323313	2003 US_{101}	—	October 20, 2003	Socorro	LINEAR	·	890 m	MPC · JPL
323314	2003 UZ_{107}	—	October 19, 2003	Palomar	NEAT	·	3.6 km	MPC · JPL
323315	2003 UF_{111}	—	October 20, 2003	Kitt Peak	Spacewatch	·	3.7 km	MPC · JPL
323316	2003 UA_{112}	—	October 20, 2003	Socorro	LINEAR	·	960 m	MPC · JPL
323317	2003 UY_{114}	—	October 20, 2003	Kitt Peak	Spacewatch	·	760 m	MPC · JPL
323318	2003 UE_{115}	—	October 20, 2003	Kitt Peak	Spacewatch	·	4.6 km	MPC · JPL
323319	2003 US_{117}	—	October 30, 2003	Socorro	LINEAR	H	620 m	MPC · JPL
323320	2003 UB_{118}	—	October 17, 2003	Kitt Peak	Spacewatch	·	910 m	MPC · JPL
323321	2003 UZ_{131}	—	October 19, 2003	Palomar	NEAT	·	870 m	MPC · JPL
323322	2003 UJ_{133}	—	September 22, 2003	Palomar	NEAT	·	700 m	MPC · JPL
323323	2003 UD_{135}	—	October 21, 2003	Anderson Mesa	LONEOS	EOS	2.9 km	MPC · JPL
323324	2003 UL_{135}	—	October 21, 2003	Palomar	NEAT	·	1.2 km	MPC · JPL
323325	2003 UR_{141}	—	October 18, 2003	Anderson Mesa	LONEOS	·	930 m	MPC · JPL
323326	2003 UZ_{150}	—	October 21, 2003	Kitt Peak	Spacewatch	EUP	6.1 km	MPC · JPL
323327	2003 UK_{156}	—	October 15, 2003	Anderson Mesa	LONEOS	·	830 m	MPC · JPL
323328	2003 UJ_{164}	—	October 21, 2003	Socorro	LINEAR	CYB	5.0 km	MPC · JPL
323329	2003 UD_{167}	—	October 22, 2003	Socorro	LINEAR	·	1 km	MPC · JPL
323330	2003 UM_{172}	—	October 20, 2003	Socorro	LINEAR	·	1.2 km	MPC · JPL
323331	2003 UC_{175}	—	October 21, 2003	Kitt Peak	Spacewatch	·	1.0 km	MPC · JPL
323332	2003 UJ_{178}	—	October 21, 2003	Palomar	NEAT	NYS	1.1 km	MPC · JPL
323333	2003 UG_{185}	—	October 21, 2003	Kitt Peak	Spacewatch	MAS	680 m	MPC · JPL
323334	2003 UW_{185}	—	October 22, 2003	Socorro	LINEAR	·	3.6 km	MPC · JPL
323335	2003 UD_{191}	—	October 23, 2003	Anderson Mesa	LONEOS	·	1.5 km	MPC · JPL
323336	2003 UL_{193}	—	October 20, 2003	Kitt Peak	Spacewatch	·	4.6 km	MPC · JPL
323337	2003 UT_{203}	—	October 21, 2003	Kitt Peak	Spacewatch	·	810 m	MPC · JPL
323338	2003 UW_{212}	—	October 23, 2003	Haleakala	NEAT	·	5.1 km	MPC · JPL
323339	2003 UE_{219}	—	September 18, 2003	Kitt Peak	Spacewatch	·	1.1 km	MPC · JPL
323340	2003 UF_{222}	—	October 3, 2003	Kitt Peak	Spacewatch	·	1.0 km	MPC · JPL
323341	2003 UC_{233}	—	October 24, 2003	Kitt Peak	Spacewatch	·	1.2 km	MPC · JPL
323342	2003 UK_{261}	—	October 26, 2003	Kitt Peak	Spacewatch	·	3.9 km	MPC · JPL
323343	2003 US_{267}	—	October 23, 2003	Kitt Peak	Spacewatch	·	1 km	MPC · JPL
323344	2003 UQ_{277}	—	October 25, 2003	Socorro	LINEAR	NYS	1.4 km	MPC · JPL
323345	2003 UM_{295}	—	September 28, 2003	Kitt Peak	Spacewatch	·	910 m	MPC · JPL
323346	2003 UP_{299}	—	September 20, 2003	Anderson Mesa	LONEOS	V	640 m	MPC · JPL
323347	2003 UH_{304}	—	October 17, 2003	Kitt Peak	Spacewatch	HYG	3.3 km	MPC · JPL
323348	2003 UP_{325}	—	October 17, 2003	Apache Point	SDSS	·	2.2 km	MPC · JPL
323349	2003 UM_{328}	—	October 17, 2003	Apache Point	SDSS	EOS	2.6 km	MPC · JPL
323350	2003 US_{331}	—	October 18, 2003	Apache Point	SDSS	·	880 m	MPC · JPL
323351	2003 UV_{332}	—	October 18, 2003	Apache Point	SDSS	·	1.0 km	MPC · JPL
323352	2003 UQ_{337}	—	September 16, 2003	Kitt Peak	Spacewatch	·	3.1 km	MPC · JPL
323353	2003 UQ_{343}	—	October 19, 2003	Kitt Peak	Spacewatch	·	3.5 km	MPC · JPL
323354	2003 UV_{360}	—	September 16, 2003	Kitt Peak	Spacewatch	THM	2.9 km	MPC · JPL
323355	2003 US_{362}	—	October 20, 2003	Kitt Peak	Spacewatch	·	770 m	MPC · JPL
323356	2003 UW_{373}	—	October 22, 2003	Apache Point	SDSS	·	2.6 km	MPC · JPL
323357	2003 UZ_{375}	—	October 22, 2003	Apache Point	SDSS	·	660 m	MPC · JPL
323358	2003 UX_{376}	—	October 22, 2003	Apache Point	SDSS	·	740 m	MPC · JPL
323359	2003 US_{377}	—	September 28, 2003	Kitt Peak	Spacewatch	·	1.7 km	MPC · JPL
323360	2003 UU_{400}	—	October 23, 2003	Apache Point	SDSS	·	980 m	MPC · JPL
323361	2003 WQ_{3}	—	November 16, 2003	Catalina	CSS	·	1.0 km	MPC · JPL
323362	2003 WF_{6}	—	October 25, 2003	Socorro	LINEAR	·	1.5 km	MPC · JPL
323363	2003 WB_{7}	—	November 18, 2003	Palomar	NEAT	·	5.4 km	MPC · JPL
323364	2003 WD_{17}	—	November 18, 2003	Palomar	NEAT	·	1.3 km	MPC · JPL
323365	2003 WF_{24}	—	November 19, 2003	Kitt Peak	Spacewatch	·	1.0 km	MPC · JPL
323366	2003 WA_{34}	—	November 19, 2003	Kitt Peak	Spacewatch	·	1.1 km	MPC · JPL
323367	2003 WC_{60}	—	November 18, 2003	Palomar	NEAT	THM	3.2 km	MPC · JPL
323368	2003 WK_{65}	—	November 19, 2003	Kitt Peak	Spacewatch	·	1.1 km	MPC · JPL
323369	2003 WA_{71}	—	November 20, 2003	Palomar	NEAT	·	5.5 km	MPC · JPL
323370	2003 WH_{93}	—	November 19, 2003	Anderson Mesa	LONEOS	·	1.2 km	MPC · JPL
323371	2003 WB_{102}	—	November 21, 2003	Socorro	LINEAR	·	1.0 km	MPC · JPL
323372	2003 WL_{109}	—	November 20, 2003	Socorro	LINEAR	CYB	4.5 km	MPC · JPL
323373	2003 WW_{110}	—	November 20, 2003	Socorro	LINEAR	PHO	1.2 km	MPC · JPL
323374	2003 WY_{116}	—	November 20, 2003	Socorro	LINEAR	·	1.3 km	MPC · JPL
323375	2003 WX_{117}	—	November 20, 2003	Socorro	LINEAR	NYS	1.2 km	MPC · JPL
323376	2003 WG_{143}	—	November 23, 2003	Socorro	LINEAR	MAS	820 m	MPC · JPL
323377	2003 WY_{148}	—	November 24, 2003	Socorro	LINEAR	TIR	5.2 km	MPC · JPL
323378	2003 XG_{4}	—	December 1, 2003	Socorro	LINEAR	·	1.5 km	MPC · JPL
323379	2003 XC_{29}	—	November 19, 2003	Kitt Peak	Spacewatch	·	1.1 km	MPC · JPL
323380	2003 YY	—	December 17, 2003	Socorro	LINEAR	H	920 m	MPC · JPL
323381	2003 YB_{16}	—	December 17, 2003	Anderson Mesa	LONEOS	H	740 m	MPC · JPL
323382	2003 YA_{31}	—	December 18, 2003	Socorro	LINEAR	MAS	830 m	MPC · JPL
323383	2003 YX_{58}	—	December 19, 2003	Socorro	LINEAR	·	1.3 km	MPC · JPL
323384	2003 YX_{59}	—	December 19, 2003	Kitt Peak	Spacewatch	NYS	1.4 km	MPC · JPL
323385	2003 YQ_{69}	—	December 21, 2003	Kitt Peak	Spacewatch	V	670 m	MPC · JPL
323386	2003 YU_{73}	—	December 18, 2003	Kitt Peak	Spacewatch	·	1.3 km	MPC · JPL
323387	2003 YE_{74}	—	December 18, 2003	Socorro	LINEAR	·	1.5 km	MPC · JPL
323388	2003 YS_{90}	—	December 20, 2003	Socorro	LINEAR	·	1.4 km	MPC · JPL
323389	2003 YG_{93}	—	December 21, 2003	Socorro	LINEAR	·	1.2 km	MPC · JPL
323390	2003 YL_{96}	—	December 19, 2003	Socorro	LINEAR	NYS	1.3 km	MPC · JPL
323391	2003 YV_{103}	—	December 21, 2003	Socorro	LINEAR	·	1.3 km	MPC · JPL
323392	2003 YZ_{105}	—	December 22, 2003	Socorro	LINEAR	·	1.2 km	MPC · JPL
323393	2003 YE_{116}	—	December 27, 2003	Socorro	LINEAR	V	670 m	MPC · JPL
323394	2003 YF_{116}	—	December 27, 2003	Socorro	LINEAR	NYS	1.3 km	MPC · JPL
323395	2003 YV_{135}	—	December 28, 2003	Kitt Peak	Spacewatch	V	720 m	MPC · JPL
323396	2004 AE_{3}	—	January 13, 2004	Anderson Mesa	LONEOS	H	690 m	MPC · JPL
323397	2004 AU_{12}	—	January 13, 2004	Kitt Peak	Spacewatch	·	1.9 km	MPC · JPL
323398	2004 AR_{20}	—	January 15, 2004	Kitt Peak	Spacewatch	·	1.2 km	MPC · JPL
323399	2004 BZ	—	January 16, 2004	Kitt Peak	Spacewatch	·	1.2 km	MPC · JPL
323400	2004 BH_{21}	—	January 18, 2004	Kitt Peak	Spacewatch	·	1.4 km	MPC · JPL

== 323401–323500 ==
back to top

Designation			Discovery			Properties		Ref
Permanent	Provisional	Named after	Date	Site	Discoverer(s)	Category	Diam.	Ref
323401	2004 BM_{22}	—	January 17, 2004	Palomar	NEAT	·	1.1 km	MPC · JPL
323402	2004 BP_{23}	—	January 18, 2004	Palomar	NEAT	·	1.6 km	MPC · JPL
323403	2004 BZ_{29}	—	January 18, 2004	Palomar	NEAT	V	800 m	MPC · JPL
323404	2004 BK_{36}	—	January 19, 2004	Kitt Peak	Spacewatch	·	1.6 km	MPC · JPL
323405	2004 BQ_{55}	—	January 22, 2004	Socorro	LINEAR	PHO	1.0 km	MPC · JPL
323406	2004 BB_{86}	—	January 29, 2004	Socorro	LINEAR	H	620 m	MPC · JPL
323407	2004 BD_{125}	—	January 16, 2004	Kitt Peak	Spacewatch	MAS	680 m	MPC · JPL
323408	2004 BX_{132}	—	January 17, 2004	Kitt Peak	Spacewatch	·	1.0 km	MPC · JPL
323409	2004 CK_{43}	—	February 12, 2004	Kitt Peak	Spacewatch	MAS	840 m	MPC · JPL
323410	2004 CK_{84}	—	February 13, 2004	Kitt Peak	Spacewatch	V	870 m	MPC · JPL
323411	2004 CQ_{110}	—	February 14, 2004	Catalina	CSS	H	630 m	MPC · JPL
323412	2004 CB_{116}	—	February 11, 2004	Anderson Mesa	LONEOS	·	1.7 km	MPC · JPL
323413	2004 CE_{119}	—	February 12, 2004	Kitt Peak	Spacewatch	·	1.4 km	MPC · JPL
323414	2004 DQ_{19}	—	February 17, 2004	Catalina	CSS	H	560 m	MPC · JPL
323415	2004 DM_{56}	—	February 22, 2004	Kitt Peak	Spacewatch	NYS	1.1 km	MPC · JPL
323416	2004 EE_{1}	—	March 14, 2004	Socorro	LINEAR	H	800 m	MPC · JPL
323417	2004 EQ_{1}	—	March 11, 2004	Palomar	NEAT	HIL · 3:2	5.9 km	MPC · JPL
323418	2004 EH_{6}	—	March 12, 2004	Palomar	NEAT	·	1.1 km	MPC · JPL
323419	2004 EF_{10}	—	March 14, 2004	Catalina	CSS	·	1.7 km	MPC · JPL
323420	2004 EB_{25}	—	March 15, 2004	Socorro	LINEAR	H	740 m	MPC · JPL
323421	2004 EF_{77}	—	March 15, 2004	Socorro	LINEAR	·	1.4 km	MPC · JPL
323422	2004 EJ_{84}	—	March 15, 2004	Kitt Peak	Spacewatch	·	1.5 km	MPC · JPL
323423	2004 FQ_{2}	—	March 17, 2004	Socorro	LINEAR	H	550 m	MPC · JPL
323424	2004 FK_{3}	—	March 16, 2004	Socorro	LINEAR	H	620 m	MPC · JPL
323425	2004 FV_{4}	—	March 18, 2004	Kitt Peak	Spacewatch	H	670 m	MPC · JPL
323426	2004 FA_{32}	—	March 24, 2004	Catalina	CSS	PHO	1.7 km	MPC · JPL
323427	2004 FP_{46}	—	March 17, 2004	Socorro	LINEAR	H	630 m	MPC · JPL
323428	2004 FR_{54}	—	March 18, 2004	Kitt Peak	Spacewatch	·	1.4 km	MPC · JPL
323429	2004 FK_{103}	—	March 23, 2004	Kitt Peak	Spacewatch	·	930 m	MPC · JPL
323430	2004 FZ_{116}	—	March 26, 2004	Kitt Peak	Spacewatch	EUN	1.1 km	MPC · JPL
323431	2004 FG_{120}	—	March 23, 2004	Kitt Peak	Spacewatch	·	1.8 km	MPC · JPL
323432	2004 FN_{138}	—	March 29, 2004	Socorro	LINEAR	H	960 m	MPC · JPL
323433	2004 FY_{147}	—	March 16, 2004	Siding Spring	SSS	EUN	1.5 km	MPC · JPL
323434	2004 FF_{165}	—	March 23, 2004	Socorro	LINEAR	·	1.5 km	MPC · JPL
323435	2004 GC_{17}	—	April 10, 2004	Palomar	NEAT	·	1.7 km	MPC · JPL
323436	2004 GD_{21}	—	April 11, 2004	Palomar	NEAT	·	1.8 km	MPC · JPL
323437	2004 GZ_{21}	—	April 12, 2004	Palomar	NEAT	·	1.2 km	MPC · JPL
323438	2004 GM_{28}	—	April 14, 2004	Anderson Mesa	LONEOS	H	780 m	MPC · JPL
323439	2004 GA_{49}	—	April 12, 2004	Kitt Peak	Spacewatch	·	1.4 km	MPC · JPL
323440	2004 GY_{84}	—	April 14, 2004	Kitt Peak	Spacewatch	·	1.4 km	MPC · JPL
323441	2004 HT	—	April 17, 2004	Socorro	LINEAR	H	690 m	MPC · JPL
323442	2004 HB_{1}	—	April 19, 2004	Desert Eagle	W. K. Y. Yeung	·	1.5 km	MPC · JPL
323443	2004 HP_{9}	—	April 17, 2004	Socorro	LINEAR	·	1.6 km	MPC · JPL
323444	2004 HG_{11}	—	April 19, 2004	Socorro	LINEAR	MAR	1.4 km	MPC · JPL
323445	2004 HV_{27}	—	April 20, 2004	Socorro	LINEAR	·	1.5 km	MPC · JPL
323446	2004 HM_{28}	—	April 20, 2004	Socorro	LINEAR	·	2.0 km	MPC · JPL
323447	2004 HS_{28}	—	April 20, 2004	Socorro	LINEAR	·	1.7 km	MPC · JPL
323448	2004 HL_{29}	—	April 21, 2004	Kitt Peak	Spacewatch	·	1.2 km	MPC · JPL
323449	2004 HY_{30}	—	April 21, 2004	Reedy Creek	J. Broughton	·	1.7 km	MPC · JPL
323450	2004 HF_{33}	—	April 22, 2004	Socorro	LINEAR	H	750 m	MPC · JPL
323451	2004 HN_{35}	—	April 20, 2004	Socorro	LINEAR	·	1.5 km	MPC · JPL
323452	2004 HT_{52}	—	April 24, 2004	Kitt Peak	Spacewatch	·	2.0 km	MPC · JPL
323453	2004 HQ_{53}	—	April 25, 2004	Haleakala	NEAT	·	2.0 km	MPC · JPL
323454	2004 HL_{55}	—	April 24, 2004	Anderson Mesa	LONEOS	·	1.9 km	MPC · JPL
323455	2004 HQ_{58}	—	April 24, 2004	Socorro	LINEAR	·	1.5 km	MPC · JPL
323456	2004 HJ_{74}	—	April 28, 2004	Haleakala	NEAT	·	1.7 km	MPC · JPL
323457	2004 JH_{4}	—	May 10, 2004	Catalina	CSS	·	1.7 km	MPC · JPL
323458	2004 JW_{10}	—	May 12, 2004	Catalina	CSS	·	2.5 km	MPC · JPL
323459	2004 JW_{17}	—	May 12, 2004	Siding Spring	SSS	·	1.4 km	MPC · JPL
323460	2004 JO_{18}	—	May 13, 2004	Anderson Mesa	LONEOS	·	2.1 km	MPC · JPL
323461	2004 JZ_{26}	—	May 15, 2004	Socorro	LINEAR	·	2.1 km	MPC · JPL
323462	2004 JM_{28}	—	May 12, 2004	Socorro	LINEAR	H	920 m	MPC · JPL
323463	2004 JA_{44}	—	May 12, 2004	Anderson Mesa	LONEOS	·	1.5 km	MPC · JPL
323464	2004 KM_{3}	—	May 16, 2004	Socorro	LINEAR	·	1.7 km	MPC · JPL
323465	2004 KM_{12}	—	May 22, 2004	Catalina	CSS	(1547)	1.8 km	MPC · JPL
323466	2004 KR_{13}	—	May 21, 2004	Catalina	CSS	·	1.9 km	MPC · JPL
323467	2004 KX_{13}	—	May 22, 2004	Catalina	CSS	H	780 m	MPC · JPL
323468	2004 KA_{15}	—	May 19, 2004	Needville	J. Dellinger, P. G. A. Garossino	·	2.0 km	MPC · JPL
323469	2004 KH_{18}	—	May 16, 2004	Socorro	LINEAR	·	1.9 km	MPC · JPL
323470	2004 KJ_{18}	—	May 20, 2004	Siding Spring	SSS	·	2.2 km	MPC · JPL
323471	2004 LY_{1}	—	June 10, 2004	Socorro	LINEAR	·	2.7 km	MPC · JPL
323472	2004 LM_{3}	—	June 11, 2004	Kitt Peak	Spacewatch	·	2.2 km	MPC · JPL
323473	2004 LS_{3}	—	June 10, 2004	Goodricke-Pigott	R. A. Tucker	EUN	1.7 km	MPC · JPL
323474	2004 LU_{4}	—	June 12, 2004	Kitt Peak	Spacewatch	·	2.5 km	MPC · JPL
323475	2004 LQ_{5}	—	June 10, 2004	Campo Imperatore	CINEOS	·	1.8 km	MPC · JPL
323476	2004 LD_{7}	—	June 11, 2004	Socorro	LINEAR	·	4.2 km	MPC · JPL
323477	2004 LG_{25}	—	June 15, 2004	Socorro	LINEAR	·	3.0 km	MPC · JPL
323478	2004 LX_{26}	—	June 12, 2004	Catalina	CSS	·	2.1 km	MPC · JPL
323479	2004 LP_{31}	—	June 12, 2004	Catalina	CSS	·	2.4 km	MPC · JPL
323480	2004 NS_{10}	—	July 9, 2004	Siding Spring	SSS	·	1.6 km	MPC · JPL
323481	2004 NY_{19}	—	July 14, 2004	Socorro	LINEAR	DOR	2.9 km	MPC · JPL
323482	2004 NC_{28}	—	July 11, 2004	Socorro	LINEAR	·	1.8 km	MPC · JPL
323483	2004 OW_{8}	—	July 18, 2004	Socorro	LINEAR	MRX	1.2 km	MPC · JPL
323484	2004 OL_{15}	—	July 25, 2004	Anderson Mesa	LONEOS	BRA	2.0 km	MPC · JPL
323485	2004 PO_{8}	—	August 6, 2004	Palomar	NEAT	·	3.5 km	MPC · JPL
323486	2004 PM_{25}	—	August 8, 2004	Socorro	LINEAR	·	2.3 km	MPC · JPL
323487	2004 PV_{37}	—	August 9, 2004	Socorro	LINEAR	·	2.6 km	MPC · JPL
323488	2004 PU_{45}	—	August 7, 2004	Siding Spring	SSS	MIS	3.5 km	MPC · JPL
323489	2004 PP_{53}	—	August 8, 2004	Socorro	LINEAR	·	2.1 km	MPC · JPL
323490	2004 PJ_{55}	—	August 8, 2004	Palomar	NEAT	·	2.4 km	MPC · JPL
323491	2004 PX_{56}	—	August 9, 2004	Socorro	LINEAR	·	2.4 km	MPC · JPL
323492	2004 PV_{71}	—	August 8, 2004	Socorro	LINEAR	·	2.8 km	MPC · JPL
323493	2004 PK_{73}	—	August 8, 2004	Socorro	LINEAR	EUN	1.6 km	MPC · JPL
323494	2004 PB_{95}	—	August 11, 2004	Palomar	NEAT	·	2.8 km	MPC · JPL
323495	2004 PH_{100}	—	August 12, 2004	Socorro	LINEAR	·	2.3 km	MPC · JPL
323496	2004 PO_{106}	—	August 12, 2004	Socorro	LINEAR	·	3.6 km	MPC · JPL
323497	2004 PK_{115}	—	August 11, 2004	Siding Spring	SSS	·	2.8 km	MPC · JPL
323498	2004 QE_{1}	—	August 19, 2004	Socorro	LINEAR	·	1.4 km	MPC · JPL
323499	2004 QA_{4}	—	August 16, 2004	Siding Spring	SSS	·	2.3 km	MPC · JPL
323500	2004 QL_{8}	—	August 16, 2004	Siding Spring	SSS	·	2.0 km	MPC · JPL

== 323501–323600 ==
back to top

Designation			Discovery			Properties		Ref
Permanent	Provisional	Named after	Date	Site	Discoverer(s)	Category	Diam.	Ref
323501	2004 QL_{9}	—	August 21, 2004	Catalina	CSS	·	3.1 km	MPC · JPL
323502	2004 QV_{10}	—	August 21, 2004	Siding Spring	SSS	·	4.0 km	MPC · JPL
323503	2004 QA_{12}	—	August 21, 2004	Siding Spring	SSS	BRA	1.9 km	MPC · JPL
323504	2004 QC_{13}	—	August 21, 2004	Siding Spring	SSS	·	2.4 km	MPC · JPL
323505	2004 QT_{25}	—	August 27, 2004	Anderson Mesa	LONEOS	·	3.7 km	MPC · JPL
323506	2004 QF_{28}	—	August 23, 2004	Wise	Wise	TEL	1.7 km	MPC · JPL
323507	2004 RZ_{11}	—	September 7, 2004	St. Véran	St. Veran	·	2.0 km	MPC · JPL
323508	2004 RU_{33}	—	September 7, 2004	Socorro	LINEAR	·	2.6 km	MPC · JPL
323509	2004 RS_{35}	—	September 7, 2004	Socorro	LINEAR	·	3.5 km	MPC · JPL
323510	2004 RR_{38}	—	September 7, 2004	Palomar	NEAT	·	2.4 km	MPC · JPL
323511	2004 RJ_{39}	—	September 7, 2004	Kitt Peak	Spacewatch	·	2.9 km	MPC · JPL
323512	2004 RU_{55}	—	September 8, 2004	Socorro	LINEAR	·	3.2 km	MPC · JPL
323513	2004 RE_{57}	—	September 8, 2004	Socorro	LINEAR	EOS	2.3 km	MPC · JPL
323514	2004 RF_{64}	—	September 8, 2004	Socorro	LINEAR	TEL	1.6 km	MPC · JPL
323515	2004 RJ_{66}	—	September 8, 2004	Socorro	LINEAR	·	2.5 km	MPC · JPL
323516	2004 RP_{68}	—	September 8, 2004	Socorro	LINEAR	·	3.3 km	MPC · JPL
323517	2004 RB_{82}	—	September 8, 2004	Palomar	NEAT	·	2.5 km	MPC · JPL
323518	2004 RP_{93}	—	September 8, 2004	Socorro	LINEAR	·	4.6 km	MPC · JPL
323519	2004 RC_{99}	—	September 8, 2004	Socorro	LINEAR	·	2.0 km	MPC · JPL
323520	2004 RT_{100}	—	September 8, 2004	Socorro	LINEAR	·	2.2 km	MPC · JPL
323521	2004 RX_{100}	—	September 8, 2004	Socorro	LINEAR	·	2.2 km	MPC · JPL
323522	2004 RC_{103}	—	September 8, 2004	Socorro	LINEAR	·	3.8 km	MPC · JPL
323523	2004 RF_{113}	—	September 6, 2004	Socorro	LINEAR	THB	5.4 km	MPC · JPL
323524	2004 RY_{115}	—	August 10, 2004	Campo Imperatore	CINEOS	AEO	1.3 km	MPC · JPL
323525	2004 RD_{135}	—	September 7, 2004	Kitt Peak	Spacewatch	KOR	1.4 km	MPC · JPL
323526	2004 RO_{135}	—	September 7, 2004	Kitt Peak	Spacewatch	·	2.5 km	MPC · JPL
323527	2004 RO_{147}	—	September 9, 2004	Socorro	LINEAR	KOR	1.7 km	MPC · JPL
323528	2004 RR_{158}	—	September 10, 2004	Socorro	LINEAR	·	3.0 km	MPC · JPL
323529	2004 RY_{173}	—	September 10, 2004	Socorro	LINEAR	·	2.8 km	MPC · JPL
323530	2004 RG_{176}	—	September 10, 2004	Socorro	LINEAR	·	2.7 km	MPC · JPL
323531	2004 RX_{179}	—	September 10, 2004	Socorro	LINEAR	EUN	2.0 km	MPC · JPL
323532	2004 RN_{186}	—	September 10, 2004	Socorro	LINEAR	·	2.3 km	MPC · JPL
323533	2004 RF_{187}	—	September 10, 2004	Socorro	LINEAR	EOS	2.5 km	MPC · JPL
323534	2004 RP_{190}	—	September 10, 2004	Socorro	LINEAR	·	2.9 km	MPC · JPL
323535	2004 RY_{196}	—	September 10, 2004	Socorro	LINEAR	·	2.4 km	MPC · JPL
323536	2004 RR_{228}	—	September 9, 2004	Kitt Peak	Spacewatch	·	3.3 km	MPC · JPL
323537	2004 RG_{253}	—	September 15, 2004	Three Buttes	Jones, G. R.	EOS	2.6 km	MPC · JPL
323538	2004 RA_{257}	—	September 9, 2004	Socorro	LINEAR	KOR	1.8 km	MPC · JPL
323539	2004 RQ_{270}	—	September 11, 2004	Kitt Peak	Spacewatch	HOF	3.5 km	MPC · JPL
323540	2004 RA_{271}	—	September 11, 2004	Kitt Peak	Spacewatch	KOR	1.3 km	MPC · JPL
323541	2004 RS_{273}	—	September 11, 2004	Kitt Peak	Spacewatch	·	2.4 km	MPC · JPL
323542	2004 RG_{278}	—	September 14, 2004	Socorro	LINEAR	·	3.6 km	MPC · JPL
323543	2004 RX_{279}	—	September 15, 2004	Kitt Peak	Spacewatch	·	2.3 km	MPC · JPL
323544	2004 RZ_{307}	—	September 13, 2004	Socorro	LINEAR	TIN	1.4 km	MPC · JPL
323545	2004 RS_{345}	—	September 7, 2004	Kitt Peak	Spacewatch	·	2.8 km	MPC · JPL
323546	2004 RA_{357}	—	September 14, 2004	Anderson Mesa	LONEOS	TRE	3.4 km	MPC · JPL
323547	2004 SA_{15}	—	September 17, 2004	Anderson Mesa	LONEOS	·	3.3 km	MPC · JPL
323548	2004 SY_{25}	—	September 17, 2004	Socorro	LINEAR	·	4.6 km	MPC · JPL
323549	2004 SR_{30}	—	September 17, 2004	Socorro	LINEAR	DOR	3.1 km	MPC · JPL
323550	2004 SM_{44}	—	September 18, 2004	Socorro	LINEAR	LIX	4.8 km	MPC · JPL
323551	2004 SR_{44}	—	September 18, 2004	Socorro	LINEAR	·	3.1 km	MPC · JPL
323552 Trudybell	2004 TB	Trudybell	October 2, 2004	Wrightwood	J. W. Young	·	3.1 km	MPC · JPL
323553	2004 TT_{5}	—	October 5, 2004	Kitt Peak	Spacewatch	EOS	2.4 km	MPC · JPL
323554	2004 TK_{25}	—	October 4, 2004	Kitt Peak	Spacewatch	BRA	1.6 km	MPC · JPL
323555	2004 TY_{27}	—	October 4, 2004	Kitt Peak	Spacewatch	·	2.8 km	MPC · JPL
323556	2004 TD_{36}	—	October 4, 2004	Kitt Peak	Spacewatch	·	3.2 km	MPC · JPL
323557	2004 TK_{37}	—	October 4, 2004	Kitt Peak	Spacewatch	EOS	2.2 km	MPC · JPL
323558	2004 TH_{53}	—	October 4, 2004	Kitt Peak	Spacewatch	·	2.4 km	MPC · JPL
323559	2004 TK_{54}	—	October 4, 2004	Kitt Peak	Spacewatch	EOS	2.3 km	MPC · JPL
323560	2004 TK_{58}	—	October 5, 2004	Kitt Peak	Spacewatch	·	2.2 km	MPC · JPL
323561	2004 TR_{73}	—	October 6, 2004	Kitt Peak	Spacewatch	·	3.0 km	MPC · JPL
323562	2004 TA_{81}	—	October 5, 2004	Kitt Peak	Spacewatch	AGN	1.5 km	MPC · JPL
323563	2004 TC_{85}	—	October 5, 2004	Kitt Peak	Spacewatch	·	3.5 km	MPC · JPL
323564	2004 TS_{85}	—	October 5, 2004	Kitt Peak	Spacewatch	(13314)	2.3 km	MPC · JPL
323565	2004 TY_{86}	—	October 5, 2004	Kitt Peak	Spacewatch	·	1.7 km	MPC · JPL
323566	2004 TV_{88}	—	October 5, 2004	Kitt Peak	Spacewatch	·	3.3 km	MPC · JPL
323567	2004 TO_{92}	—	October 5, 2004	Kitt Peak	Spacewatch	·	3.6 km	MPC · JPL
323568	2004 TJ_{103}	—	October 6, 2004	Palomar	NEAT	·	4.4 km	MPC · JPL
323569	2004 TG_{113}	—	October 7, 2004	Kitt Peak	Spacewatch	·	3.1 km	MPC · JPL
323570	2004 TN_{114}	—	October 8, 2004	Anderson Mesa	LONEOS	·	3.0 km	MPC · JPL
323571	2004 TV_{116}	—	October 4, 2004	Anderson Mesa	LONEOS	EOS	2.8 km	MPC · JPL
323572	2004 TT_{129}	—	October 7, 2004	Socorro	LINEAR	DOR	3.5 km	MPC · JPL
323573	2004 TO_{132}	—	October 7, 2004	Palomar	NEAT	EOS	2.5 km	MPC · JPL
323574	2004 TB_{144}	—	October 4, 2004	Kitt Peak	Spacewatch	·	3.3 km	MPC · JPL
323575	2004 TX_{147}	—	October 6, 2004	Kitt Peak	Spacewatch	·	2.8 km	MPC · JPL
323576	2004 TQ_{172}	—	October 8, 2004	Socorro	LINEAR	·	3.7 km	MPC · JPL
323577	2004 TV_{172}	—	October 8, 2004	Socorro	LINEAR	EOS	2.9 km	MPC · JPL
323578	2004 TA_{187}	—	October 7, 2004	Kitt Peak	Spacewatch	DOR	3.0 km	MPC · JPL
323579	2004 TN_{188}	—	October 7, 2004	Kitt Peak	Spacewatch	·	2.2 km	MPC · JPL
323580	2004 TT_{196}	—	October 7, 2004	Kitt Peak	Spacewatch	·	3.2 km	MPC · JPL
323581	2004 TP_{201}	—	October 7, 2004	Kitt Peak	Spacewatch	EOS	2.0 km	MPC · JPL
323582	2004 TF_{205}	—	October 7, 2004	Kitt Peak	Spacewatch	·	2.9 km	MPC · JPL
323583	2004 TJ_{213}	—	October 8, 2004	Kitt Peak	Spacewatch	·	2.1 km	MPC · JPL
323584	2004 TG_{214}	—	October 9, 2004	Kitt Peak	Spacewatch	KOR	1.5 km	MPC · JPL
323585	2004 TK_{215}	—	October 10, 2004	Kitt Peak	Spacewatch	·	2.2 km	MPC · JPL
323586	2004 TL_{227}	—	October 8, 2004	Kitt Peak	Spacewatch	HYG	2.8 km	MPC · JPL
323587	2004 TM_{228}	—	October 8, 2004	Kitt Peak	Spacewatch	·	2.0 km	MPC · JPL
323588	2004 TW_{238}	—	October 9, 2004	Kitt Peak	Spacewatch	·	2.9 km	MPC · JPL
323589	2004 TY_{250}	—	October 9, 2004	Kitt Peak	Spacewatch	EOS	1.7 km	MPC · JPL
323590	2004 TZ_{264}	—	October 9, 2004	Kitt Peak	Spacewatch	·	2.8 km	MPC · JPL
323591	2004 TW_{265}	—	October 9, 2004	Kitt Peak	Spacewatch	EOS	2.4 km	MPC · JPL
323592	2004 TZ_{266}	—	October 9, 2004	Kitt Peak	Spacewatch	EOS	2.7 km	MPC · JPL
323593	2004 TD_{279}	—	October 9, 2004	Kitt Peak	Spacewatch	·	4.7 km	MPC · JPL
323594	2004 TV_{279}	—	October 10, 2004	Kitt Peak	Spacewatch	HYG	3.3 km	MPC · JPL
323595	2004 TB_{281}	—	October 10, 2004	Kitt Peak	Spacewatch	THM	2.6 km	MPC · JPL
323596	2004 TC_{294}	—	October 10, 2004	Kitt Peak	Spacewatch	·	2.7 km	MPC · JPL
323597	2004 TB_{295}	—	October 10, 2004	Kitt Peak	Spacewatch	·	3.5 km	MPC · JPL
323598	2004 TO_{296}	—	October 10, 2004	Kitt Peak	Spacewatch	·	3.4 km	MPC · JPL
323599	2004 TD_{302}	—	October 9, 2004	Socorro	LINEAR	·	2.4 km	MPC · JPL
323600	2004 TB_{327}	—	October 14, 2004	Palomar	NEAT	·	3.6 km	MPC · JPL

== 323601–323700 ==
back to top

Designation			Discovery			Properties		Ref
Permanent	Provisional	Named after	Date	Site	Discoverer(s)	Category	Diam.	Ref
323601	2004 TM_{327}	—	October 15, 2004	Anderson Mesa	LONEOS	(895)	4.1 km	MPC · JPL
323602	2004 TA_{328}	—	October 4, 2004	Palomar	NEAT	·	3.4 km	MPC · JPL
323603	2004 TK_{331}	—	October 9, 2004	Kitt Peak	Spacewatch	·	2.6 km	MPC · JPL
323604	2004 TX_{332}	—	October 9, 2004	Kitt Peak	Spacewatch	EOS	2.3 km	MPC · JPL
323605	2004 TL_{344}	—	October 15, 2004	Mount Lemmon	Mount Lemmon Survey	EOS	2.6 km	MPC · JPL
323606	2004 TU_{344}	—	October 15, 2004	Anderson Mesa	LONEOS	THB	3.3 km	MPC · JPL
323607	2004 TT_{346}	—	October 15, 2004	Anderson Mesa	LONEOS	EOS	2.4 km	MPC · JPL
323608	2004 TU_{355}	—	October 7, 2004	Socorro	LINEAR	·	4.1 km	MPC · JPL
323609	2004 TA_{356}	—	October 7, 2004	Socorro	LINEAR	EOS	2.8 km	MPC · JPL
323610	2004 TR_{356}	—	October 18, 2004	Socorro	LINEAR	·	4.0 km	MPC · JPL
323611	2004 TD_{368}	—	October 13, 2004	Kitt Peak	Spacewatch	·	2.8 km	MPC · JPL
323612	2004 TK_{369}	—	October 8, 2004	Kitt Peak	Spacewatch	EOS	2.4 km	MPC · JPL
323613	2004 UA_{6}	—	October 20, 2004	Socorro	LINEAR	·	4.0 km	MPC · JPL
323614	2004 VT_{7}	—	November 3, 2004	Kitt Peak	Spacewatch	(8737)	4.3 km	MPC · JPL
323615	2004 VL_{13}	—	October 7, 2004	Socorro	LINEAR	THB	4.7 km	MPC · JPL
323616	2004 VO_{19}	—	November 4, 2004	Anderson Mesa	LONEOS	·	4.3 km	MPC · JPL
323617	2004 VD_{27}	—	November 4, 2004	Catalina	CSS	·	4.5 km	MPC · JPL
323618	2004 VX_{29}	—	November 3, 2004	Kitt Peak	Spacewatch	VER	3.1 km	MPC · JPL
323619	2004 VV_{35}	—	November 3, 2004	Kitt Peak	Spacewatch	·	4.0 km	MPC · JPL
323620	2004 VH_{39}	—	November 4, 2004	Kitt Peak	Spacewatch	HYG	3.4 km	MPC · JPL
323621	2004 VH_{41}	—	November 4, 2004	Kitt Peak	Spacewatch	·	2.8 km	MPC · JPL
323622	2004 VG_{54}	—	November 4, 2004	Socorro	LINEAR	·	3.9 km	MPC · JPL
323623	2004 VM_{54}	—	November 4, 2004	Socorro	LINEAR	·	4.2 km	MPC · JPL
323624	2004 VY_{54}	—	November 9, 2004	Goodricke-Pigott	R. A. Tucker	EOS	3.4 km	MPC · JPL
323625	2004 VC_{57}	—	November 5, 2004	Socorro	LINEAR	THB	4.3 km	MPC · JPL
323626	2004 VM_{72}	—	November 5, 2004	Palomar	NEAT	·	3.5 km	MPC · JPL
323627	2004 VS_{74}	—	November 12, 2004	Catalina	CSS	HYG	3.7 km	MPC · JPL
323628	2004 VX_{79}	—	November 3, 2004	Kitt Peak	Spacewatch	THM	2.1 km	MPC · JPL
323629	2004 VW_{80}	—	November 4, 2004	Kitt Peak	Spacewatch	EOS	3.1 km	MPC · JPL
323630	2004 VR_{91}	—	November 3, 2004	Catalina	CSS	·	3.7 km	MPC · JPL
323631	2004 VC_{94}	—	November 10, 2004	Goodricke-Pigott	R. A. Tucker	·	3.7 km	MPC · JPL
323632	2004 WH_{4}	—	November 17, 2004	Campo Imperatore	CINEOS	·	4.7 km	MPC · JPL
323633	2004 XV	—	December 1, 2004	Palomar	NEAT	EOS	2.4 km	MPC · JPL
323634	2004 XW_{6}	—	December 2, 2004	Socorro	LINEAR	·	4.9 km	MPC · JPL
323635	2004 XZ_{7}	—	December 2, 2004	Palomar	NEAT	EOS	3.0 km	MPC · JPL
323636	2004 XU_{21}	—	December 8, 2004	Socorro	LINEAR	·	3.1 km	MPC · JPL
323637	2004 XE_{40}	—	December 10, 2004	Socorro	LINEAR	·	4.4 km	MPC · JPL
323638	2004 XT_{41}	—	December 9, 2004	Bergisch Gladbach	W. Bickel	·	850 m	MPC · JPL
323639	2004 XE_{42}	—	December 8, 2004	Needville	J. Dellinger	·	4.0 km	MPC · JPL
323640	2004 XC_{79}	—	December 10, 2004	Socorro	LINEAR	·	3.9 km	MPC · JPL
323641	2004 XP_{110}	—	December 14, 2004	Kitt Peak	Spacewatch	·	4.7 km	MPC · JPL
323642	2004 XJ_{113}	—	December 10, 2004	Kitt Peak	Spacewatch	VER	4.4 km	MPC · JPL
323643	2004 XQ_{130}	—	December 11, 2004	Calvin-Rehoboth	L. A. Molnar	VER	3.1 km	MPC · JPL
323644	2004 XA_{157}	—	December 14, 2004	Kitt Peak	Spacewatch	VER	3.7 km	MPC · JPL
323645	2004 YB_{2}	—	December 16, 2004	Kitt Peak	Spacewatch	·	870 m	MPC · JPL
323646	2004 YB_{17}	—	December 18, 2004	Mount Lemmon	Mount Lemmon Survey	·	980 m	MPC · JPL
323647	2004 YJ_{23}	—	December 18, 2004	Mount Lemmon	Mount Lemmon Survey	·	760 m	MPC · JPL
323648	2005 AP_{3}	—	January 6, 2005	Begues	Manteca, J.	·	860 m	MPC · JPL
323649	2005 AK_{48}	—	January 13, 2005	Kitt Peak	Spacewatch	·	1.0 km	MPC · JPL
323650	2005 BC_{17}	—	January 16, 2005	Kitt Peak	Spacewatch	·	1 km	MPC · JPL
323651	2005 BR_{20}	—	January 16, 2005	Kitt Peak	Spacewatch	·	610 m	MPC · JPL
323652	2005 BX_{28}	—	January 31, 2005	Palomar	NEAT	·	970 m	MPC · JPL
323653	2005 CM_{22}	—	February 1, 2005	Catalina	CSS	·	2.4 km	MPC · JPL
323654	2005 CH_{30}	—	February 1, 2005	Kitt Peak	Spacewatch	·	620 m	MPC · JPL
323655	2005 CF_{33}	—	February 2, 2005	Kitt Peak	Spacewatch	CYB	4.0 km	MPC · JPL
323656	2005 CD_{60}	—	February 3, 2005	Socorro	LINEAR	·	760 m	MPC · JPL
323657	2005 CS_{69}	—	February 1, 2005	Kitt Peak	Spacewatch	·	690 m	MPC · JPL
323658	2005 EY_{5}	—	March 1, 2005	Kitt Peak	Spacewatch	·	1.2 km	MPC · JPL
323659	2005 EW_{7}	—	March 1, 2005	Kitt Peak	Spacewatch	PHO	2.6 km	MPC · JPL
323660	2005 EE_{8}	—	March 1, 2005	Kitt Peak	Spacewatch	·	750 m	MPC · JPL
323661	2005 EA_{20}	—	March 3, 2005	Catalina	CSS	·	800 m	MPC · JPL
323662	2005 EX_{24}	—	March 3, 2005	Catalina	CSS	·	900 m	MPC · JPL
323663	2005 EQ_{38}	—	March 3, 2005	Socorro	LINEAR	PHO	1.2 km	MPC · JPL
323664	2005 EF_{44}	—	March 3, 2005	Kitt Peak	Spacewatch	·	800 m	MPC · JPL
323665	2005 EZ_{47}	—	March 3, 2005	Catalina	CSS	·	890 m	MPC · JPL
323666	2005 EM_{82}	—	March 4, 2005	Kitt Peak	Spacewatch	·	800 m	MPC · JPL
323667	2005 ES_{82}	—	March 4, 2005	Kitt Peak	Spacewatch	·	760 m	MPC · JPL
323668	2005 EC_{87}	—	March 4, 2005	Mount Lemmon	Mount Lemmon Survey	·	690 m	MPC · JPL
323669	2005 ER_{92}	—	March 8, 2005	Mount Lemmon	Mount Lemmon Survey	·	870 m	MPC · JPL
323670	2005 EM_{117}	—	March 4, 2005	Mount Lemmon	Mount Lemmon Survey	·	700 m	MPC · JPL
323671	2005 EW_{137}	—	March 9, 2005	Mount Lemmon	Mount Lemmon Survey	·	820 m	MPC · JPL
323672	2005 EG_{140}	—	March 10, 2005	Mount Lemmon	Mount Lemmon Survey	·	820 m	MPC · JPL
323673	2005 EQ_{144}	—	March 10, 2005	Mount Lemmon	Mount Lemmon Survey	·	1.0 km	MPC · JPL
323674	2005 EB_{159}	—	March 9, 2005	Mount Lemmon	Mount Lemmon Survey	V	510 m	MPC · JPL
323675	2005 EP_{164}	—	March 11, 2005	Catalina	CSS	·	780 m	MPC · JPL
323676	2005 EA_{185}	—	March 9, 2005	Kitt Peak	Spacewatch	·	1.2 km	MPC · JPL
323677	2005 EN_{195}	—	March 11, 2005	Mount Lemmon	Mount Lemmon Survey	NYS	990 m	MPC · JPL
323678	2005 EN_{221}	—	March 10, 2005	Catalina	CSS	NYS	1.1 km	MPC · JPL
323679	2005 ED_{223}	—	March 10, 2005	Catalina	CSS	·	960 m	MPC · JPL
323680	2005 EH_{236}	—	March 10, 2005	Mount Lemmon	Mount Lemmon Survey	·	620 m	MPC · JPL
323681	2005 EB_{270}	—	March 11, 2005	Socorro	LINEAR	PHO	980 m	MPC · JPL
323682	2005 EJ_{324}	—	March 10, 2005	Goodricke-Pigott	R. A. Tucker	·	890 m	MPC · JPL
323683	2005 EZ_{330}	—	March 3, 2005	Kitt Peak	Spacewatch	V	780 m	MPC · JPL
323684	2005 FU_{7}	—	March 30, 2005	Catalina	CSS	·	2.9 km	MPC · JPL
323685	2005 GC_{6}	—	April 1, 2005	Kitt Peak	Spacewatch	3:2	6.9 km	MPC · JPL
323686	2005 GW_{20}	—	April 3, 2005	Socorro	LINEAR	·	1.3 km	MPC · JPL
323687	2005 GX_{72}	—	April 4, 2005	Catalina	CSS	PHO	900 m	MPC · JPL
323688	2005 GB_{77}	—	April 6, 2005	Kitt Peak	Spacewatch	·	670 m	MPC · JPL
323689	2005 GL_{79}	—	April 6, 2005	Mount Lemmon	Mount Lemmon Survey	·	800 m	MPC · JPL
323690	2005 GG_{80}	—	April 7, 2005	Kitt Peak	Spacewatch	·	830 m	MPC · JPL
323691	2005 GH_{84}	—	April 4, 2005	Mount Lemmon	Mount Lemmon Survey	·	650 m	MPC · JPL
323692	2005 GU_{84}	—	April 4, 2005	Kitt Peak	Spacewatch	·	1.2 km	MPC · JPL
323693	2005 GN_{86}	—	April 4, 2005	Socorro	LINEAR	·	1.0 km	MPC · JPL
323694	2005 GU_{88}	—	April 5, 2005	Mount Lemmon	Mount Lemmon Survey	·	840 m	MPC · JPL
323695	2005 GY_{93}	—	April 6, 2005	Kitt Peak	Spacewatch	PHO	3.0 km	MPC · JPL
323696	2005 GS_{98}	—	April 7, 2005	Kitt Peak	Spacewatch	·	1.1 km	MPC · JPL
323697	2005 GJ_{108}	—	April 10, 2005	Mount Lemmon	Mount Lemmon Survey	·	950 m	MPC · JPL
323698	2005 GQ_{112}	—	April 6, 2005	Kitt Peak	Spacewatch	·	790 m	MPC · JPL
323699	2005 GP_{116}	—	April 11, 2005	Kitt Peak	Spacewatch	·	950 m	MPC · JPL
323700	2005 GR_{119}	—	April 1, 2005	Anderson Mesa	LONEOS	PHO	1.1 km	MPC · JPL

== 323701–323800 ==
back to top

Designation			Discovery			Properties		Ref
Permanent	Provisional	Named after	Date	Site	Discoverer(s)	Category	Diam.	Ref
323701	2005 GN_{127}	—	April 12, 2005	Mount Lemmon	Mount Lemmon Survey	·	1.1 km	MPC · JPL
323702	2005 GS_{133}	—	April 10, 2005	Kitt Peak	Spacewatch	·	1.1 km	MPC · JPL
323703	2005 GF_{140}	—	April 13, 2005	Kitt Peak	Spacewatch	·	1.1 km	MPC · JPL
323704	2005 GK_{153}	—	April 13, 2005	Socorro	LINEAR	PHO	1.0 km	MPC · JPL
323705	2005 GY_{160}	—	April 13, 2005	Anderson Mesa	LONEOS	·	990 m	MPC · JPL
323706	2005 GK_{161}	—	April 13, 2005	Catalina	CSS	·	1.0 km	MPC · JPL
323707	2005 GW_{167}	—	April 11, 2005	Mount Lemmon	Mount Lemmon Survey	·	1.1 km	MPC · JPL
323708	2005 GD_{178}	—	April 15, 2005	Anderson Mesa	LONEOS	·	1.1 km	MPC · JPL
323709	2005 HZ_{5}	—	April 30, 2005	Kitt Peak	Spacewatch	·	1.1 km	MPC · JPL
323710	2005 HK_{7}	—	April 30, 2005	Kitt Peak	Spacewatch	·	1 km	MPC · JPL
323711	2005 JS	—	May 3, 2005	Socorro	LINEAR	·	920 m	MPC · JPL
323712	2005 JR_{2}	—	May 3, 2005	Kitt Peak	Spacewatch	·	1.3 km	MPC · JPL
323713	2005 JK_{14}	—	May 1, 2005	Palomar	NEAT	·	830 m	MPC · JPL
323714	2005 JC_{17}	—	May 4, 2005	Anderson Mesa	LONEOS	·	1.1 km	MPC · JPL
323715	2005 JH_{32}	—	May 4, 2005	Mount Lemmon	Mount Lemmon Survey	NYS	1.3 km	MPC · JPL
323716	2005 JW_{33}	—	May 4, 2005	Mount Lemmon	Mount Lemmon Survey	MAS	730 m	MPC · JPL
323717	2005 JG_{34}	—	May 4, 2005	Kitt Peak	Spacewatch	·	1.6 km	MPC · JPL
323718	2005 JC_{36}	—	May 4, 2005	Kitt Peak	Spacewatch	V	770 m	MPC · JPL
323719	2005 JT_{40}	—	May 7, 2005	Mount Lemmon	Mount Lemmon Survey	·	1.1 km	MPC · JPL
323720	2005 JG_{48}	—	May 3, 2005	Kitt Peak	Spacewatch	·	890 m	MPC · JPL
323721	2005 JX_{51}	—	May 4, 2005	Kitt Peak	Spacewatch	NYS	1.5 km	MPC · JPL
323722	2005 JH_{55}	—	May 4, 2005	Kitt Peak	Spacewatch	·	1.4 km	MPC · JPL
323723	2005 JX_{57}	—	May 7, 2005	Kitt Peak	Spacewatch	·	930 m	MPC · JPL
323724	2005 JC_{107}	—	May 12, 2005	Anderson Mesa	LONEOS	PHO	1.2 km	MPC · JPL
323725	2005 JD_{120}	—	May 10, 2005	Kitt Peak	Spacewatch	·	1.4 km	MPC · JPL
323726	2005 JK_{128}	—	May 12, 2005	Palomar	NEAT	·	2.6 km	MPC · JPL
323727	2005 JJ_{153}	—	May 4, 2005	Mount Lemmon	Mount Lemmon Survey	NYS	970 m	MPC · JPL
323728	2005 JE_{168}	—	May 4, 2005	Mount Lemmon	Mount Lemmon Survey	·	1.4 km	MPC · JPL
323729	2005 JQ_{183}	—	May 11, 2005	Anderson Mesa	LONEOS	·	1.1 km	MPC · JPL
323730	2005 LM_{4}	—	June 1, 2005	Kitt Peak	Spacewatch	V	740 m	MPC · JPL
323731	2005 LT_{16}	—	June 6, 2005	Kitt Peak	Spacewatch	MAS	820 m	MPC · JPL
323732	2005 LC_{17}	—	June 6, 2005	Kitt Peak	Spacewatch	·	1.8 km	MPC · JPL
323733	2005 LH_{18}	—	June 6, 2005	Kitt Peak	Spacewatch	·	1.2 km	MPC · JPL
323734	2005 LS_{23}	—	June 10, 2005	Kitt Peak	Spacewatch	NYS	1.0 km	MPC · JPL
323735	2005 LP_{26}	—	June 8, 2005	Kitt Peak	Spacewatch	·	1.3 km	MPC · JPL
323736	2005 LH_{30}	—	June 12, 2005	Kitt Peak	Spacewatch	NYS	1.4 km	MPC · JPL
323737	2005 MZ_{11}	—	June 28, 2005	Kitt Peak	Spacewatch	NYS	1.3 km	MPC · JPL
323738	2005 MW_{17}	—	June 27, 2005	Kitt Peak	Spacewatch	·	1.3 km	MPC · JPL
323739	2005 MK_{22}	—	June 30, 2005	Kitt Peak	Spacewatch	·	1.5 km	MPC · JPL
323740	2005 MH_{23}	—	June 23, 2005	Palomar	NEAT	·	1.9 km	MPC · JPL
323741	2005 MK_{30}	—	June 29, 2005	Kitt Peak	Spacewatch	MAR	1.4 km	MPC · JPL
323742	2005 ME_{42}	—	June 28, 2005	Palomar	NEAT	·	1.5 km	MPC · JPL
323743	2005 MX_{44}	—	June 27, 2005	Kitt Peak	Spacewatch	·	1.6 km	MPC · JPL
323744	2005 MQ_{48}	—	June 29, 2005	Kitt Peak	Spacewatch	·	1.2 km	MPC · JPL
323745	2005 MW_{48}	—	June 29, 2005	Palomar	NEAT	·	1.7 km	MPC · JPL
323746	2005 MY_{53}	—	June 18, 2005	Mount Lemmon	Mount Lemmon Survey	EUN	1.6 km	MPC · JPL
323747	2005 MD_{54}	—	June 27, 2005	Kitt Peak	Spacewatch	·	1.2 km	MPC · JPL
323748	2005 NC_{27}	—	July 5, 2005	Mount Lemmon	Mount Lemmon Survey	·	1.4 km	MPC · JPL
323749	2005 NV_{32}	—	July 5, 2005	Palomar	NEAT	V	780 m	MPC · JPL
323750	2005 NB_{75}	—	July 10, 2005	Kitt Peak	Spacewatch	·	2.1 km	MPC · JPL
323751	2005 NR_{122}	—	July 3, 2005	Palomar	NEAT	·	1.5 km	MPC · JPL
323752	2005 NB_{123}	—	July 5, 2005	Siding Spring	SSS	·	1.7 km	MPC · JPL
323753	2005 OL	—	July 16, 2005	Kitt Peak	Spacewatch	·	1.5 km	MPC · JPL
323754	2005 OV_{3}	—	July 28, 2005	Reedy Creek	J. Broughton	·	1.7 km	MPC · JPL
323755	2005 OC_{6}	—	July 28, 2005	Palomar	NEAT	MAR	1.5 km	MPC · JPL
323756	2005 OG_{7}	—	July 28, 2005	Palomar	NEAT	EUN	1.5 km	MPC · JPL
323757	2005 OU_{10}	—	July 27, 2005	Palomar	NEAT	·	1.6 km	MPC · JPL
323758	2005 OR_{18}	—	July 30, 2005	Palomar	NEAT	·	1.6 km	MPC · JPL
323759	2005 OA_{21}	—	July 28, 2005	Palomar	NEAT	·	1.4 km	MPC · JPL
323760	2005 OP_{22}	—	July 31, 2005	Siding Spring	SSS	·	1.5 km	MPC · JPL
323761	2005 OM_{26}	—	July 29, 2005	Anderson Mesa	LONEOS	·	1.6 km	MPC · JPL
323762	2005 OY_{28}	—	July 27, 2005	Palomar	NEAT	·	2.1 km	MPC · JPL
323763	2005 PD_{4}	—	August 6, 2005	Siding Spring	SSS	·	2.1 km	MPC · JPL
323764	2005 PB_{7}	—	August 1, 2005	Siding Spring	SSS	EUN	1.4 km	MPC · JPL
323765	2005 PM_{18}	—	August 11, 2005	Reedy Creek	J. Broughton	·	1.7 km	MPC · JPL
323766	2005 QK_{4}	—	August 24, 2005	Palomar	NEAT	·	1.4 km	MPC · JPL
323767	2005 QK_{14}	—	August 25, 2005	Palomar	NEAT	ADE	2.1 km	MPC · JPL
323768	2005 QU_{19}	—	August 25, 2005	Campo Imperatore	CINEOS	·	1.7 km	MPC · JPL
323769	2005 QV_{21}	—	August 26, 2005	Campo Imperatore	CINEOS	·	950 m	MPC · JPL
323770	2005 QJ_{25}	—	August 27, 2005	Kitt Peak	Spacewatch	·	1.6 km	MPC · JPL
323771	2005 QV_{35}	—	August 25, 2005	Palomar	NEAT	·	1.4 km	MPC · JPL
323772	2005 QJ_{37}	—	August 25, 2005	Palomar	NEAT	PAD	2.0 km	MPC · JPL
323773	2005 QW_{38}	—	August 25, 2005	Campo Imperatore	CINEOS	RAF	970 m	MPC · JPL
323774	2005 QJ_{39}	—	August 26, 2005	Anderson Mesa	LONEOS	·	1.8 km	MPC · JPL
323775	2005 QF_{48}	—	August 26, 2005	Palomar	NEAT	T_{j} (2.97) · 3:2	7.7 km	MPC · JPL
323776	2005 QW_{48}	—	August 26, 2005	Palomar	NEAT	·	1.3 km	MPC · JPL
323777	2005 QF_{51}	—	August 26, 2005	Palomar	NEAT	EUN	1.4 km	MPC · JPL
323778	2005 QY_{55}	—	August 28, 2005	Kitt Peak	Spacewatch	·	2.3 km	MPC · JPL
323779	2005 QJ_{56}	—	August 28, 2005	Kitt Peak	Spacewatch	EUN	1.5 km	MPC · JPL
323780	2005 QK_{60}	—	August 26, 2005	Anderson Mesa	LONEOS	·	2.4 km	MPC · JPL
323781	2005 QH_{63}	—	August 26, 2005	Palomar	NEAT	·	1.7 km	MPC · JPL
323782	2005 QR_{79}	—	August 26, 2005	Haleakala	NEAT	H	860 m	MPC · JPL
323783	2005 QS_{90}	—	August 25, 2005	Palomar	NEAT	·	1.3 km	MPC · JPL
323784	2005 QZ_{90}	—	August 25, 2005	Palomar	NEAT	·	1.9 km	MPC · JPL
323785	2005 QU_{91}	—	August 26, 2005	Anderson Mesa	LONEOS	·	2.5 km	MPC · JPL
323786	2005 QF_{103}	—	August 27, 2005	Palomar	NEAT	·	2.1 km	MPC · JPL
323787	2005 QL_{108}	—	August 27, 2005	Palomar	NEAT	(13314)	1.8 km	MPC · JPL
323788	2005 QY_{112}	—	August 27, 2005	Palomar	NEAT	·	2.0 km	MPC · JPL
323789	2005 QZ_{112}	—	August 27, 2005	Palomar	NEAT	·	1.9 km	MPC · JPL
323790	2005 QK_{121}	—	August 28, 2005	Kitt Peak	Spacewatch	WIT	1.0 km	MPC · JPL
323791	2005 QR_{130}	—	August 28, 2005	Kitt Peak	Spacewatch	·	1.3 km	MPC · JPL
323792	2005 QD_{136}	—	August 28, 2005	Kitt Peak	Spacewatch	·	1.6 km	MPC · JPL
323793	2005 QY_{140}	—	August 29, 2005	Kitt Peak	Spacewatch	·	1.6 km	MPC · JPL
323794	2005 QV_{148}	—	August 30, 2005	Kitt Peak	Spacewatch	·	2.9 km	MPC · JPL
323795	2005 QH_{149}	—	August 27, 2005	Siding Spring	SSS	H	760 m	MPC · JPL
323796	2005 QV_{150}	—	August 30, 2005	Kitt Peak	Spacewatch	·	1.9 km	MPC · JPL
323797	2005 QB_{151}	—	August 30, 2005	Kitt Peak	Spacewatch	·	2.4 km	MPC · JPL
323798	2005 QH_{151}	—	August 30, 2005	Kitt Peak	Spacewatch	(5)	1.3 km	MPC · JPL
323799	2005 QT_{151}	—	August 31, 2005	Anderson Mesa	LONEOS	·	2.5 km	MPC · JPL
323800	2005 QK_{155}	—	August 28, 2005	Siding Spring	SSS	·	1.6 km	MPC · JPL

== 323801–323900 ==
back to top

Designation			Discovery			Properties		Ref
Permanent	Provisional	Named after	Date	Site	Discoverer(s)	Category	Diam.	Ref
323801	2005 QT_{156}	—	August 30, 2005	Palomar	NEAT	·	2.4 km	MPC · JPL
323802	2005 QA_{157}	—	August 30, 2005	Palomar	NEAT	·	2.9 km	MPC · JPL
323803	2005 QC_{161}	—	August 28, 2005	Kitt Peak	Spacewatch	·	2.4 km	MPC · JPL
323804	2005 QU_{161}	—	August 28, 2005	Siding Spring	SSS	·	2.5 km	MPC · JPL
323805	2005 QT_{165}	—	August 31, 2005	Palomar	NEAT	GAL	2.4 km	MPC · JPL
323806	2005 QP_{173}	—	August 29, 2005	Palomar	NEAT	EUN	1.4 km	MPC · JPL
323807	2005 QD_{181}	—	August 30, 2005	Palomar	NEAT	·	2.3 km	MPC · JPL
323808	2005 QX_{190}	—	August 31, 2005	Kitt Peak	Spacewatch	·	1.8 km	MPC · JPL
323809	2005 RA_{9}	—	September 8, 2005	Socorro	LINEAR	H	700 m	MPC · JPL
323810	2005 RU_{13}	—	September 1, 2005	Kitt Peak	Spacewatch	·	1.1 km	MPC · JPL
323811	2005 RL_{24}	—	September 11, 2005	Anderson Mesa	LONEOS	H	770 m	MPC · JPL
323812	2005 RE_{27}	—	September 10, 2005	Anderson Mesa	LONEOS	H	730 m	MPC · JPL
323813	2005 RF_{31}	—	September 11, 2005	Kitt Peak	Spacewatch	·	2.3 km	MPC · JPL
323814	2005 SW	—	September 22, 2005	Palomar	NEAT	(194)	1.4 km	MPC · JPL
323815	2005 SC_{2}	—	September 18, 2005	Palomar	NEAT	·	2.4 km	MPC · JPL
323816	2005 SG_{6}	—	September 23, 2005	Kitt Peak	Spacewatch	·	2.0 km	MPC · JPL
323817	2005 SN_{11}	—	September 23, 2005	Kitt Peak	Spacewatch	·	2.1 km	MPC · JPL
323818	2005 SJ_{16}	—	September 26, 2005	Kitt Peak	Spacewatch	·	1.8 km	MPC · JPL
323819	2005 ST_{17}	—	September 26, 2005	Kitt Peak	Spacewatch	AGN	1.1 km	MPC · JPL
323820	2005 SG_{22}	—	September 23, 2005	Kitt Peak	Spacewatch	·	1.7 km	MPC · JPL
323821	2005 SU_{30}	—	September 23, 2005	Catalina	CSS	EUN	1.5 km	MPC · JPL
323822	2005 SM_{31}	—	September 23, 2005	Kitt Peak	Spacewatch	·	2.4 km	MPC · JPL
323823	2005 SR_{33}	—	September 23, 2005	Kitt Peak	Spacewatch	·	1.1 km	MPC · JPL
323824	2005 SA_{38}	—	September 24, 2005	Kitt Peak	Spacewatch	·	2.0 km	MPC · JPL
323825	2005 SJ_{38}	—	September 24, 2005	Kitt Peak	Spacewatch	·	1.8 km	MPC · JPL
323826	2005 SV_{38}	—	September 24, 2005	Kitt Peak	Spacewatch	·	1.9 km	MPC · JPL
323827	2005 SE_{42}	—	September 24, 2005	Kitt Peak	Spacewatch	·	1.6 km	MPC · JPL
323828	2005 SZ_{42}	—	September 24, 2005	Kitt Peak	Spacewatch	H	480 m	MPC · JPL
323829	2005 SE_{44}	—	September 24, 2005	Kitt Peak	Spacewatch	·	1.8 km	MPC · JPL
323830	2005 SW_{50}	—	September 24, 2005	Kitt Peak	Spacewatch	·	1.9 km	MPC · JPL
323831	2005 SL_{51}	—	September 24, 2005	Kitt Peak	Spacewatch	·	2.2 km	MPC · JPL
323832	2005 SN_{51}	—	September 24, 2005	Kitt Peak	Spacewatch	·	1.9 km	MPC · JPL
323833	2005 SX_{51}	—	September 24, 2005	Kitt Peak	Spacewatch	KON	2.7 km	MPC · JPL
323834	2005 SB_{54}	—	September 25, 2005	Kitt Peak	Spacewatch	·	2.0 km	MPC · JPL
323835	2005 SK_{58}	—	September 26, 2005	Goodricke-Pigott	R. A. Tucker	·	2.5 km	MPC · JPL
323836	2005 SU_{59}	—	September 26, 2005	Kitt Peak	Spacewatch	·	1.8 km	MPC · JPL
323837	2005 ST_{62}	—	September 26, 2005	Kitt Peak	Spacewatch	·	1.6 km	MPC · JPL
323838	2005 SF_{66}	—	September 26, 2005	Palomar	NEAT	·	2.6 km	MPC · JPL
323839	2005 SP_{66}	—	September 27, 2005	Kitt Peak	Spacewatch	AEO	1.4 km	MPC · JPL
323840	2005 SK_{75}	—	September 24, 2005	Kitt Peak	Spacewatch	KOR	1.5 km	MPC · JPL
323841	2005 SZ_{75}	—	September 24, 2005	Kitt Peak	Spacewatch	·	1.6 km	MPC · JPL
323842	2005 SV_{76}	—	September 24, 2005	Kitt Peak	Spacewatch	·	1.3 km	MPC · JPL
323843	2005 SH_{81}	—	September 24, 2005	Kitt Peak	Spacewatch	MAR	940 m	MPC · JPL
323844	2005 SO_{81}	—	September 24, 2005	Kitt Peak	Spacewatch	·	2.2 km	MPC · JPL
323845	2005 SJ_{85}	—	September 24, 2005	Kitt Peak	Spacewatch	·	2.4 km	MPC · JPL
323846	2005 SS_{86}	—	September 24, 2005	Kitt Peak	Spacewatch	·	1.6 km	MPC · JPL
323847	2005 SX_{86}	—	September 24, 2005	Kitt Peak	Spacewatch	NEM	2.5 km	MPC · JPL
323848	2005 SJ_{87}	—	September 24, 2005	Kitt Peak	Spacewatch	(12739)	1.9 km	MPC · JPL
323849	2005 SG_{90}	—	September 24, 2005	Kitt Peak	Spacewatch	·	2.1 km	MPC · JPL
323850	2005 ST_{97}	—	September 25, 2005	Palomar	NEAT	EUN	1.0 km	MPC · JPL
323851	2005 SU_{102}	—	September 25, 2005	Kitt Peak	Spacewatch	·	1.8 km	MPC · JPL
323852	2005 SZ_{102}	—	September 25, 2005	Kitt Peak	Spacewatch	·	2.0 km	MPC · JPL
323853	2005 SO_{108}	—	September 26, 2005	Kitt Peak	Spacewatch	HOF	2.5 km	MPC · JPL
323854	2005 SA_{110}	—	September 26, 2005	Kitt Peak	Spacewatch	·	1.2 km	MPC · JPL
323855	2005 SP_{116}	—	September 27, 2005	Palomar	NEAT	H ·	670 m	MPC · JPL
323856	2005 SU_{117}	—	September 28, 2005	Palomar	NEAT	GEF	1.6 km	MPC · JPL
323857	2005 ST_{122}	—	September 29, 2005	Anderson Mesa	LONEOS	·	2.1 km	MPC · JPL
323858	2005 SV_{122}	—	September 29, 2005	Anderson Mesa	LONEOS	·	1.4 km	MPC · JPL
323859	2005 SG_{126}	—	September 29, 2005	Mount Lemmon	Mount Lemmon Survey	·	1.9 km	MPC · JPL
323860	2005 SE_{127}	—	September 29, 2005	Mount Lemmon	Mount Lemmon Survey	HNS	1.4 km	MPC · JPL
323861	2005 ST_{142}	—	September 25, 2005	Kitt Peak	Spacewatch	KON	3.3 km	MPC · JPL
323862	2005 SO_{143}	—	September 25, 2005	Kitt Peak	Spacewatch	·	1.3 km	MPC · JPL
323863	2005 SG_{148}	—	September 25, 2005	Kitt Peak	Spacewatch	·	1.3 km	MPC · JPL
323864	2005 SO_{151}	—	September 25, 2005	Kitt Peak	Spacewatch	·	1.6 km	MPC · JPL
323865	2005 ST_{153}	—	September 26, 2005	Kitt Peak	Spacewatch	·	1.5 km	MPC · JPL
323866	2005 SU_{155}	—	September 26, 2005	Catalina	CSS	·	2.4 km	MPC · JPL
323867	2005 SN_{156}	—	September 26, 2005	Kitt Peak	Spacewatch	·	1.8 km	MPC · JPL
323868	2005 SP_{159}	—	September 26, 2005	Catalina	CSS	·	3.6 km	MPC · JPL
323869	2005 SM_{161}	—	September 27, 2005	Kitt Peak	Spacewatch	·	1.5 km	MPC · JPL
323870	2005 SN_{162}	—	September 27, 2005	Kitt Peak	Spacewatch	·	1.3 km	MPC · JPL
323871	2005 SL_{163}	—	September 27, 2005	Kitt Peak	Spacewatch	·	2.0 km	MPC · JPL
323872	2005 SR_{165}	—	September 28, 2005	Palomar	NEAT	GAL	2.4 km	MPC · JPL
323873	2005 SY_{167}	—	September 29, 2005	Palomar	NEAT	EUN	1.9 km	MPC · JPL
323874	2005 SD_{169}	—	September 29, 2005	Kitt Peak	Spacewatch	HOF	2.5 km	MPC · JPL
323875	2005 SK_{170}	—	September 29, 2005	Kitt Peak	Spacewatch	·	2.3 km	MPC · JPL
323876	2005 SA_{172}	—	September 29, 2005	Kitt Peak	Spacewatch	AGN	1.1 km	MPC · JPL
323877	2005 SH_{172}	—	September 29, 2005	Kitt Peak	Spacewatch	WIT	930 m	MPC · JPL
323878	2005 SA_{183}	—	September 29, 2005	Kitt Peak	Spacewatch	·	1.4 km	MPC · JPL
323879	2005 SA_{204}	—	September 30, 2005	Mount Lemmon	Mount Lemmon Survey	MAR	1.1 km	MPC · JPL
323880	2005 SL_{206}	—	September 30, 2005	Anderson Mesa	LONEOS	·	3.5 km	MPC · JPL
323881	2005 SN_{207}	—	September 30, 2005	Anderson Mesa	LONEOS	MRX	1.4 km	MPC · JPL
323882	2005 SV_{220}	—	September 29, 2005	Catalina	CSS	·	2.6 km	MPC · JPL
323883	2005 SG_{227}	—	September 30, 2005	Kitt Peak	Spacewatch	·	2.5 km	MPC · JPL
323884	2005 SE_{238}	—	September 29, 2005	Kitt Peak	Spacewatch	·	2.2 km	MPC · JPL
323885	2005 SL_{238}	—	September 29, 2005	Kitt Peak	Spacewatch	·	1.7 km	MPC · JPL
323886	2005 SO_{242}	—	September 30, 2005	Kitt Peak	Spacewatch	ADE	2.6 km	MPC · JPL
323887	2005 ST_{243}	—	September 30, 2005	Palomar	NEAT	·	2.2 km	MPC · JPL
323888	2005 SW_{245}	—	September 30, 2005	Mount Lemmon	Mount Lemmon Survey	EUN	1.4 km	MPC · JPL
323889	2005 SH_{246}	—	September 30, 2005	Kitt Peak	Spacewatch	·	2.0 km	MPC · JPL
323890	2005 SR_{246}	—	September 30, 2005	Kitt Peak	Spacewatch	EUN	1.5 km	MPC · JPL
323891	2005 SM_{255}	—	September 22, 2005	Palomar	NEAT	·	1.9 km	MPC · JPL
323892	2005 SD_{270}	—	September 29, 2005	Kitt Peak	Spacewatch	·	1.9 km	MPC · JPL
323893	2005 SL_{278}	—	September 24, 2005	Kitt Peak	Spacewatch	·	1.9 km	MPC · JPL
323894	2005 SS_{287}	—	September 26, 2005	Apache Point	A. C. Becker	BRA	1.7 km	MPC · JPL
323895	2005 SA_{288}	—	September 26, 2005	Apache Point	A. C. Becker	·	2.7 km	MPC · JPL
323896	2005 SR_{293}	—	September 30, 2005	Anderson Mesa	LONEOS	HNS	1.6 km	MPC · JPL
323897	2005 TM_{1}	—	October 1, 2005	Socorro	LINEAR	MAR	1.3 km	MPC · JPL
323898	2005 TU_{1}	—	October 1, 2005	Catalina	CSS	·	2.2 km	MPC · JPL
323899	2005 TY_{4}	—	October 1, 2005	Mount Lemmon	Mount Lemmon Survey	MRX	1.1 km	MPC · JPL
323900	2005 TD_{10}	—	October 2, 2005	Palomar	NEAT	·	2.3 km	MPC · JPL

== 323901–324000 ==
back to top

Designation			Discovery			Properties		Ref
Permanent	Provisional	Named after	Date	Site	Discoverer(s)	Category	Diam.	Ref
323901	2005 TZ_{11}	—	October 1, 2005	Kitt Peak	Spacewatch	MIS	2.7 km	MPC · JPL
323902	2005 TZ_{24}	—	October 1, 2005	Mount Lemmon	Mount Lemmon Survey	·	1.6 km	MPC · JPL
323903	2005 TW_{27}	—	October 1, 2005	Mount Lemmon	Mount Lemmon Survey	AGN	1.1 km	MPC · JPL
323904	2005 TY_{27}	—	October 1, 2005	Mount Lemmon	Mount Lemmon Survey	·	2.1 km	MPC · JPL
323905	2005 TQ_{28}	—	September 25, 2005	Palomar	NEAT	·	2.6 km	MPC · JPL
323906	2005 TL_{35}	—	October 1, 2005	Kitt Peak	Spacewatch	·	1.6 km	MPC · JPL
323907	2005 TY_{38}	—	October 1, 2005	Catalina	CSS	·	2.0 km	MPC · JPL
323908	2005 TT_{60}	—	October 3, 2005	Kitt Peak	Spacewatch	·	2.3 km	MPC · JPL
323909	2005 TZ_{69}	—	October 6, 2005	Kitt Peak	Spacewatch	HNS	1.4 km	MPC · JPL
323910	2005 TM_{74}	—	October 7, 2005	Anderson Mesa	LONEOS	·	3.2 km	MPC · JPL
323911	2005 TH_{75}	—	October 2, 2005	Catalina	CSS	EUN	2.1 km	MPC · JPL
323912	2005 TD_{78}	—	October 7, 2005	Mount Lemmon	Mount Lemmon Survey	·	1.8 km	MPC · JPL
323913	2005 TL_{79}	—	October 8, 2005	Catalina	CSS	·	2.1 km	MPC · JPL
323914	2005 TQ_{80}	—	October 3, 2005	Kitt Peak	Spacewatch	·	2.0 km	MPC · JPL
323915	2005 TG_{81}	—	October 3, 2005	Kitt Peak	Spacewatch	·	1.6 km	MPC · JPL
323916	2005 TV_{81}	—	October 3, 2005	Kitt Peak	Spacewatch	·	1.5 km	MPC · JPL
323917	2005 TP_{83}	—	September 24, 2005	Kitt Peak	Spacewatch	·	2.2 km	MPC · JPL
323918	2005 TN_{84}	—	October 3, 2005	Kitt Peak	Spacewatch	·	1.8 km	MPC · JPL
323919	2005 TG_{88}	—	October 5, 2005	Catalina	CSS	·	1.7 km	MPC · JPL
323920	2005 TW_{95}	—	October 6, 2005	Mount Lemmon	Mount Lemmon Survey	·	2.1 km	MPC · JPL
323921	2005 TQ_{96}	—	October 6, 2005	Mount Lemmon	Mount Lemmon Survey	AGN	1.3 km	MPC · JPL
323922	2005 TL_{97}	—	October 6, 2005	Mount Lemmon	Mount Lemmon Survey	·	2.0 km	MPC · JPL
323923	2005 TT_{101}	—	October 7, 2005	Catalina	CSS	·	3.1 km	MPC · JPL
323924	2005 TD_{104}	—	October 8, 2005	Socorro	LINEAR	·	2.7 km	MPC · JPL
323925	2005 TW_{105}	—	October 9, 2005	Kitt Peak	Spacewatch	·	1.6 km	MPC · JPL
323926	2005 TZ_{115}	—	October 7, 2005	Kitt Peak	Spacewatch	·	1.8 km	MPC · JPL
323927	2005 TW_{116}	—	October 7, 2005	Kitt Peak	Spacewatch	MRX	970 m	MPC · JPL
323928	2005 TW_{127}	—	October 7, 2005	Kitt Peak	Spacewatch	HOF	3.2 km	MPC · JPL
323929	2005 TX_{129}	—	October 7, 2005	Kitt Peak	Spacewatch	·	1.5 km	MPC · JPL
323930	2005 TS_{134}	—	October 10, 2005	Kitt Peak	Spacewatch	·	2.4 km	MPC · JPL
323931	2005 TC_{137}	—	October 6, 2005	Kitt Peak	Spacewatch	·	2.3 km	MPC · JPL
323932	2005 TO_{142}	—	October 8, 2005	Kitt Peak	Spacewatch	·	2.9 km	MPC · JPL
323933	2005 TU_{161}	—	October 9, 2005	Kitt Peak	Spacewatch	·	2.1 km	MPC · JPL
323934	2005 TT_{163}	—	October 9, 2005	Kitt Peak	Spacewatch	·	2.6 km	MPC · JPL
323935	2005 TM_{164}	—	October 9, 2005	Kitt Peak	Spacewatch	·	940 m	MPC · JPL
323936	2005 TX_{178}	—	October 5, 2005	Kitt Peak	Spacewatch	·	1.8 km	MPC · JPL
323937	2005 TL_{188}	—	October 9, 2005	Kitt Peak	Spacewatch	·	1.3 km	MPC · JPL
323938	2005 TE_{194}	—	October 3, 2005	Kitt Peak	Spacewatch	·	1.4 km	MPC · JPL
323939	2005 TG_{195}	—	October 1, 2005	Kitt Peak	Spacewatch	·	1.3 km	MPC · JPL
323940	2005 UR_{3}	—	October 5, 2005	Kitt Peak	Spacewatch	·	2.4 km	MPC · JPL
323941	2005 UP_{13}	—	October 22, 2005	Kitt Peak	Spacewatch	AGN	1.1 km	MPC · JPL
323942	2005 US_{15}	—	October 22, 2005	Kitt Peak	Spacewatch	·	2.0 km	MPC · JPL
323943	2005 UW_{16}	—	October 22, 2005	Kitt Peak	Spacewatch	·	3.8 km	MPC · JPL
323944	2005 UA_{18}	—	October 22, 2005	Catalina	CSS	AGN	1.3 km	MPC · JPL
323945	2005 UX_{21}	—	October 23, 2005	Kitt Peak	Spacewatch	HOF	2.7 km	MPC · JPL
323946	2005 UU_{25}	—	October 23, 2005	Kitt Peak	Spacewatch	·	1.7 km	MPC · JPL
323947	2005 UR_{27}	—	October 23, 2005	Catalina	CSS	·	2.9 km	MPC · JPL
323948	2005 UC_{28}	—	October 12, 2005	Kitt Peak	Spacewatch	KOR	1.3 km	MPC · JPL
323949	2005 UM_{36}	—	October 24, 2005	Kitt Peak	Spacewatch	·	2.2 km	MPC · JPL
323950	2005 UH_{38}	—	October 24, 2005	Kitt Peak	Spacewatch	·	2.2 km	MPC · JPL
323951	2005 UP_{38}	—	October 24, 2005	Kitt Peak	Spacewatch	AST	1.9 km	MPC · JPL
323952	2005 UG_{45}	—	October 22, 2005	Kitt Peak	Spacewatch	·	2.6 km	MPC · JPL
323953	2005 UW_{47}	—	October 22, 2005	Catalina	CSS	·	2.7 km	MPC · JPL
323954	2005 UA_{48}	—	October 22, 2005	Catalina	CSS	·	2.0 km	MPC · JPL
323955	2005 UO_{48}	—	October 22, 2005	Kitt Peak	Spacewatch	·	1.8 km	MPC · JPL
323956	2005 UU_{50}	—	October 23, 2005	Catalina	CSS	·	2.4 km	MPC · JPL
323957	2005 UA_{52}	—	October 23, 2005	Catalina	CSS	·	2.5 km	MPC · JPL
323958	2005 UB_{61}	—	October 25, 2005	Mount Lemmon	Mount Lemmon Survey	·	1.8 km	MPC · JPL
323959	2005 US_{61}	—	October 25, 2005	Mount Lemmon	Mount Lemmon Survey	·	1.9 km	MPC · JPL
323960	2005 UC_{69}	—	October 23, 2005	Palomar	NEAT	·	2.2 km	MPC · JPL
323961	2005 UF_{83}	—	October 22, 2005	Kitt Peak	Spacewatch	·	1.8 km	MPC · JPL
323962	2005 UV_{84}	—	October 22, 2005	Kitt Peak	Spacewatch	·	2.2 km	MPC · JPL
323963	2005 UG_{86}	—	October 22, 2005	Kitt Peak	Spacewatch	·	2.3 km	MPC · JPL
323964	2005 UO_{91}	—	October 22, 2005	Kitt Peak	Spacewatch	·	2.0 km	MPC · JPL
323965	2005 UT_{91}	—	October 22, 2005	Kitt Peak	Spacewatch	·	2.1 km	MPC · JPL
323966	2005 UA_{93}	—	October 22, 2005	Kitt Peak	Spacewatch	·	2.2 km	MPC · JPL
323967	2005 UV_{93}	—	October 22, 2005	Kitt Peak	Spacewatch	HOF	3.0 km	MPC · JPL
323968	2005 UU_{96}	—	October 22, 2005	Kitt Peak	Spacewatch	·	1.8 km	MPC · JPL
323969	2005 UA_{105}	—	October 22, 2005	Kitt Peak	Spacewatch	·	2.5 km	MPC · JPL
323970	2005 UC_{108}	—	October 22, 2005	Kitt Peak	Spacewatch	AGN	1.3 km	MPC · JPL
323971	2005 UR_{108}	—	October 22, 2005	Kitt Peak	Spacewatch	·	1.9 km	MPC · JPL
323972	2005 UP_{115}	—	October 23, 2005	Palomar	NEAT	GEF	1.6 km	MPC · JPL
323973	2005 UG_{125}	—	October 24, 2005	Kitt Peak	Spacewatch	·	3.1 km	MPC · JPL
323974	2005 UV_{126}	—	October 24, 2005	Kitt Peak	Spacewatch	·	1.8 km	MPC · JPL
323975	2005 UH_{134}	—	October 25, 2005	Kitt Peak	Spacewatch	·	2.2 km	MPC · JPL
323976	2005 UW_{146}	—	October 26, 2005	Kitt Peak	Spacewatch	·	2.9 km	MPC · JPL
323977	2005 UZ_{148}	—	October 26, 2005	Kitt Peak	Spacewatch	AGN	1.6 km	MPC · JPL
323978	2005 UD_{149}	—	October 26, 2005	Kitt Peak	Spacewatch	·	2.0 km	MPC · JPL
323979	2005 UG_{149}	—	October 26, 2005	Kitt Peak	Spacewatch	·	2.0 km	MPC · JPL
323980	2005 UH_{150}	—	October 26, 2005	Mount Lemmon	Mount Lemmon Survey	·	2.6 km	MPC · JPL
323981	2005 UT_{153}	—	October 26, 2005	Kitt Peak	Spacewatch	AGN	1.4 km	MPC · JPL
323982	2005 UX_{174}	—	October 24, 2005	Kitt Peak	Spacewatch	·	1.9 km	MPC · JPL
323983	2005 UY_{176}	—	October 24, 2005	Kitt Peak	Spacewatch	·	3.1 km	MPC · JPL
323984	2005 UD_{179}	—	October 24, 2005	Kitt Peak	Spacewatch	KOR	1.4 km	MPC · JPL
323985	2005 US_{189}	—	October 27, 2005	Mount Lemmon	Mount Lemmon Survey	·	1.6 km	MPC · JPL
323986	2005 UE_{192}	—	October 27, 2005	Mount Lemmon	Mount Lemmon Survey	KOR	1.4 km	MPC · JPL
323987	2005 UH_{198}	—	October 25, 2005	Mount Lemmon	Mount Lemmon Survey	·	2.0 km	MPC · JPL
323988	2005 UO_{198}	—	October 25, 2005	Kitt Peak	Spacewatch	·	1.9 km	MPC · JPL
323989	2005 UY_{203}	—	October 25, 2005	Mount Lemmon	Mount Lemmon Survey	·	2.0 km	MPC · JPL
323990	2005 UF_{213}	—	October 28, 2005	Mount Lemmon	Mount Lemmon Survey	·	1.6 km	MPC · JPL
323991	2005 UN_{220}	—	October 25, 2005	Kitt Peak	Spacewatch	·	2.5 km	MPC · JPL
323992	2005 UA_{221}	—	October 25, 2005	Kitt Peak	Spacewatch	·	2.2 km	MPC · JPL
323993	2005 UL_{232}	—	October 25, 2005	Mount Lemmon	Mount Lemmon Survey	AGN	1.5 km	MPC · JPL
323994	2005 UB_{234}	—	October 25, 2005	Kitt Peak	Spacewatch	·	2.4 km	MPC · JPL
323995	2005 UB_{235}	—	October 25, 2005	Kitt Peak	Spacewatch	·	2.7 km	MPC · JPL
323996	2005 UG_{235}	—	October 25, 2005	Kitt Peak	Spacewatch	NEM	2.7 km	MPC · JPL
323997	2005 UC_{241}	—	October 25, 2005	Kitt Peak	Spacewatch	·	2.6 km	MPC · JPL
323998	2005 UM_{241}	—	October 25, 2005	Kitt Peak	Spacewatch	·	2.3 km	MPC · JPL
323999	2005 UP_{248}	—	October 28, 2005	Mount Lemmon	Mount Lemmon Survey	·	2.2 km	MPC · JPL
324000	2005 UD_{251}	—	October 23, 2005	Catalina	CSS	·	2.5 km	MPC · JPL

back to top

== See also ==
- Meanings of minor-planet names: 323001–324000
