= List of minor planets: 622001–623000 =

The following is a partial list of minor planets, running from minor-planet number 622001 through 623000, inclusive. The primary data for this and other partial lists is based on JPL's "Small-Body Orbital Elements" and data available from the Minor Planet Center. Critical list information is also provided by the MPC, unless otherwise specified from Lowell Observatory. A detailed description of the table's columns and additional sources are given on the main page including a complete list of every page in this series, and a statistical break-up on the dynamical classification of minor planets.

Also see the summary list of all named bodies in numerical and alphabetical order, and the corresponding naming citations for the number range of this particular list. New namings may only be added to this list after official publication, as the preannouncement of names is condemned by the Working Group for Small Bodies Nomenclature of the International Astronomical Union.

| Near-Earth obj. | MBA (inner) | MBA (outer) | Centaur |
| Mars-crosser | MBA (middle) | Jupiter trojan | Trans-Neptunian obj. |
| Unclassified |

== 622001–622100 ==
| Designation | | | Discovery | | | Properties | | Ref |
| Permanent | Provisional | Named after | Date | Site | Discoverer(s) | Category | Diam. | Ref |
|---|---|---|---|---|---|---|---|---|
| 622001 | 2011 UZ_{466} | — | October 26, 2011 | Haleakala | Pan-STARRS 1 | · | 1.5 km | MPC · JPL |
| 622002 | 2011 UE_{470} | — | October 26, 2011 | Haleakala | Pan-STARRS 1 | · | 1.2 km | MPC · JPL |
| 622003 | 2011 UQ_{470} | — | October 26, 2011 | Haleakala | Pan-STARRS 1 | · | 1.7 km | MPC · JPL |
| 622004 | 2011 UV_{475} | — | October 20, 2011 | Kitt Peak | Spacewatch | · | 1.3 km | MPC · JPL |
| 622005 | 2011 UE_{488} | — | October 24, 2011 | Haleakala | Pan-STARRS 1 | · | 1.2 km | MPC · JPL |
| 622006 Vákárlajos | 2011 VB_{3} | Vákárlajos | October 18, 2011 | Piszkéstető | K. Sárneczky, A. Szing | · | 2.8 km | MPC · JPL |
| 622007 | 2011 VD_{16} | — | October 17, 2011 | Kitt Peak | Spacewatch | · | 1.7 km | MPC · JPL |
| 622008 | 2011 VG_{17} | — | November 15, 2011 | Mount Lemmon | Mount Lemmon Survey | · | 1.1 km | MPC · JPL |
| 622009 | 2011 WW_{16} | — | August 13, 2002 | Kitt Peak | Spacewatch | · | 1.1 km | MPC · JPL |
| 622010 | 2011 WG_{42} | — | November 23, 2011 | Catalina | CSS | · | 1.5 km | MPC · JPL |
| 622011 | 2011 WC_{43} | — | October 27, 2011 | Mount Lemmon | Mount Lemmon Survey | HNS | 1.2 km | MPC · JPL |
| 622012 | 2011 WY_{45} | — | November 25, 2011 | Haleakala | Pan-STARRS 1 | H | 410 m | MPC · JPL |
| 622013 | 2011 WJ_{53} | — | November 16, 2006 | Kitt Peak | Spacewatch | · | 1.7 km | MPC · JPL |
| 622014 | 2011 WY_{55} | — | October 22, 2011 | Kitt Peak | Spacewatch | MAR | 980 m | MPC · JPL |
| 622015 | 2011 WS_{64} | — | November 25, 2011 | Haleakala | Pan-STARRS 1 | HNS | 1.2 km | MPC · JPL |
| 622016 | 2011 WX_{98} | — | December 3, 2007 | Kitt Peak | Spacewatch | (194) | 1.4 km | MPC · JPL |
| 622017 | 2011 WA_{115} | — | September 30, 2011 | Mount Lemmon | Mount Lemmon Survey | · | 1.9 km | MPC · JPL |
| 622018 | 2011 WA_{116} | — | November 16, 2011 | Mount Lemmon | Mount Lemmon Survey | · | 1.1 km | MPC · JPL |
| 622019 | 2011 WU_{141} | — | November 22, 2011 | Mount Lemmon | Mount Lemmon Survey | · | 1.6 km | MPC · JPL |
| 622020 | 2011 WM_{144} | — | September 12, 1994 | Kitt Peak | Spacewatch | (5) | 860 m | MPC · JPL |
| 622021 | 2011 WP_{146} | — | October 30, 2011 | Kitt Peak | Spacewatch | · | 1.4 km | MPC · JPL |
| 622022 | 2011 WE_{150} | — | April 3, 2005 | Socorro | LINEAR | EUN | 1.8 km | MPC · JPL |
| 622023 | 2011 WW_{165} | — | November 17, 2011 | Mount Lemmon | Mount Lemmon Survey | · | 1.3 km | MPC · JPL |
| 622024 | 2011 WA_{186} | — | November 17, 2011 | Mount Lemmon | Mount Lemmon Survey | · | 1.4 km | MPC · JPL |
| 622025 | 2011 YJ_{1} | — | November 29, 2011 | Kitt Peak | Spacewatch | · | 1.1 km | MPC · JPL |
| 622026 | 2011 YJ_{75} | — | December 29, 2011 | Mount Lemmon | Mount Lemmon Survey | H | 440 m | MPC · JPL |
| 622027 | 2011 YT_{85} | — | December 30, 2011 | Mount Lemmon | Mount Lemmon Survey | H | 340 m | MPC · JPL |
| 622028 | 2011 YS_{86} | — | June 4, 2014 | Haleakala | Pan-STARRS 1 | · | 1.3 km | MPC · JPL |
| 622029 | 2012 AV_{10} | — | January 30, 2003 | Haleakala | NEAT | · | 2.2 km | MPC · JPL |
| 622030 | 2012 AK_{33} | — | January 2, 2012 | Kitt Peak | Spacewatch | · | 1.3 km | MPC · JPL |
| 622031 | 2012 BL_{46} | — | January 2, 2012 | Kitt Peak | Spacewatch | · | 1.6 km | MPC · JPL |
| 622032 | 2012 BF_{64} | — | September 4, 2010 | Mount Lemmon | Mount Lemmon Survey | V | 460 m | MPC · JPL |
| 622033 | 2012 BO_{101} | — | January 27, 2012 | Mount Lemmon | Mount Lemmon Survey | · | 740 m | MPC · JPL |
| 622034 | 2012 BY_{121} | — | December 12, 2006 | Kitt Peak | Spacewatch | · | 1.8 km | MPC · JPL |
| 622035 | 2012 BB_{132} | — | December 25, 2011 | Kitt Peak | Spacewatch | · | 1.4 km | MPC · JPL |
| 622036 | 2012 BL_{161} | — | April 17, 2013 | Haleakala | Pan-STARRS 1 | · | 630 m | MPC · JPL |
| 622037 | 2012 BO_{166} | — | January 18, 2012 | Kitt Peak | Spacewatch | · | 1.3 km | MPC · JPL |
| 622038 | 2012 BV_{166} | — | April 17, 2013 | Haleakala | Pan-STARRS 1 | · | 640 m | MPC · JPL |
| 622039 | 2012 BZ_{171} | — | January 7, 2017 | Mount Lemmon | Mount Lemmon Survey | · | 2.3 km | MPC · JPL |
| 622040 | 2012 BX_{175} | — | January 30, 2012 | Kitt Peak | Spacewatch | · | 630 m | MPC · JPL |
| 622041 | 2012 BZ_{176} | — | January 26, 2012 | Haleakala | Pan-STARRS 1 | (2076) | 590 m | MPC · JPL |
| 622042 | 2012 BU_{187} | — | January 18, 2012 | Mount Lemmon | Mount Lemmon Survey | · | 1.6 km | MPC · JPL |
| 622043 | 2012 CT_{13} | — | October 31, 2006 | Catalina | CSS | JUN | 860 m | MPC · JPL |
| 622044 | 2012 CV_{28} | — | February 2, 2005 | Kitt Peak | Spacewatch | V | 500 m | MPC · JPL |
| 622045 | 2012 CD_{49} | — | October 12, 2007 | Kitt Peak | Spacewatch | (2076) | 500 m | MPC · JPL |
| 622046 | 2012 CN_{57} | — | January 10, 2012 | Mount Lemmon | Mount Lemmon Survey | H | 510 m | MPC · JPL |
| 622047 | 2012 CD_{61} | — | February 1, 2012 | Mount Lemmon | Mount Lemmon Survey | · | 2.3 km | MPC · JPL |
| 622048 | 2012 CA_{63} | — | February 3, 2012 | Haleakala | Pan-STARRS 1 | · | 740 m | MPC · JPL |
| 622049 | 2012 CJ_{66} | — | January 19, 2012 | Haleakala | Pan-STARRS 1 | · | 630 m | MPC · JPL |
| 622050 | 2012 DP_{4} | — | February 16, 2012 | Haleakala | Pan-STARRS 1 | H | 380 m | MPC · JPL |
| 622051 | 2012 DV_{103} | — | February 27, 2012 | Kitt Peak | Spacewatch | · | 1.8 km | MPC · JPL |
| 622052 | 2012 DP_{108} | — | February 28, 2012 | Haleakala | Pan-STARRS 1 | · | 1.9 km | MPC · JPL |
| 622053 | 2012 DT_{113} | — | February 16, 2012 | Haleakala | Pan-STARRS 1 | · | 530 m | MPC · JPL |
| 622054 | 2012 EX_{20} | — | July 12, 2013 | Haleakala | Pan-STARRS 1 | V | 470 m | MPC · JPL |
| 622055 | 2012 ER_{24} | — | December 3, 2015 | Mount Lemmon | Mount Lemmon Survey | · | 1.9 km | MPC · JPL |
| 622056 | 2012 EP_{25} | — | March 13, 2012 | Kitt Peak | Spacewatch | H | 410 m | MPC · JPL |
| 622057 | 2012 EN_{27} | — | March 13, 2012 | Mount Lemmon | Mount Lemmon Survey | V | 440 m | MPC · JPL |
| 622058 | 2012 EO_{31} | — | March 15, 2012 | Mount Lemmon | Mount Lemmon Survey | · | 1.7 km | MPC · JPL |
| 622059 | 2012 FB_{28} | — | March 22, 2012 | Mount Lemmon | Mount Lemmon Survey | · | 1.6 km | MPC · JPL |
| 622060 | 2012 FL_{85} | — | March 16, 2012 | Kitt Peak | Spacewatch | · | 820 m | MPC · JPL |
| 622061 | 2012 FD_{87} | — | September 27, 2009 | Mount Lemmon | Mount Lemmon Survey | · | 2.4 km | MPC · JPL |
| 622062 | 2012 FR_{89} | — | October 27, 2014 | Haleakala | Pan-STARRS 1 | · | 2.3 km | MPC · JPL |
| 622063 | 2012 FW_{89} | — | September 6, 2008 | Mount Lemmon | Mount Lemmon Survey | · | 1.4 km | MPC · JPL |
| 622064 | 2012 FG_{90} | — | November 14, 2015 | Mount Lemmon | Mount Lemmon Survey | EOS | 1.4 km | MPC · JPL |
| 622065 | 2012 FS_{90} | — | March 27, 2012 | Mount Lemmon | Mount Lemmon Survey | · | 2.0 km | MPC · JPL |
| 622066 | 2012 FN_{101} | — | March 27, 2012 | Mount Lemmon | Mount Lemmon Survey | · | 2.3 km | MPC · JPL |
| 622067 | 2012 GP | — | April 1, 2012 | Haleakala | Pan-STARRS 1 | H | 420 m | MPC · JPL |
| 622068 | 2012 GG_{31} | — | April 13, 2012 | Kitt Peak | Spacewatch | T_{j} (2.98) | 2.7 km | MPC · JPL |
| 622069 | 2012 GW_{35} | — | March 15, 2012 | Haleakala | Pan-STARRS 1 | TIR | 2.2 km | MPC · JPL |
| 622070 | 2012 GS_{44} | — | August 25, 2014 | Haleakala | Pan-STARRS 1 | EOS | 1.3 km | MPC · JPL |
| 622071 | 2012 GY_{44} | — | April 15, 2012 | Haleakala | Pan-STARRS 1 | · | 2.6 km | MPC · JPL |
| 622072 | 2012 GE_{49} | — | April 1, 2012 | Mount Lemmon | Mount Lemmon Survey | · | 910 m | MPC · JPL |
| 622073 | 2012 GV_{49} | — | April 15, 2012 | Haleakala | Pan-STARRS 1 | V | 540 m | MPC · JPL |
| 622074 | 2012 HR_{49} | — | April 22, 2012 | Kitt Peak | Spacewatch | · | 900 m | MPC · JPL |
| 622075 | 2012 HZ_{55} | — | January 5, 2012 | Haleakala | Pan-STARRS 1 | · | 1.2 km | MPC · JPL |
| 622076 | 2012 HD_{58} | — | April 13, 2012 | Kitt Peak | Spacewatch | · | 2.8 km | MPC · JPL |
| 622077 | 2012 HL_{58} | — | August 26, 1998 | Kitt Peak | Spacewatch | · | 960 m | MPC · JPL |
| 622078 | 2012 HR_{67} | — | April 21, 2012 | Mount Lemmon | Mount Lemmon Survey | · | 980 m | MPC · JPL |
| 622079 | 2012 HY_{88} | — | April 27, 2012 | Haleakala | Pan-STARRS 1 | CLA | 1.2 km | MPC · JPL |
| 622080 | 2012 HM_{93} | — | April 21, 2012 | Haleakala | Pan-STARRS 1 | · | 2.6 km | MPC · JPL |
| 622081 | 2012 HQ_{94} | — | April 21, 2012 | Mount Lemmon | Mount Lemmon Survey | · | 1.9 km | MPC · JPL |
| 622082 | 2012 HF_{100} | — | April 18, 2012 | Kitt Peak | Spacewatch | TIR | 2.0 km | MPC · JPL |
| 622083 | 2012 HN_{101} | — | April 20, 2012 | Mount Lemmon | Mount Lemmon Survey | · | 910 m | MPC · JPL |
| 622084 | 2012 HH_{102} | — | April 27, 2012 | Kitt Peak | Spacewatch | · | 810 m | MPC · JPL |
| 622085 | 2012 HV_{109} | — | April 27, 2012 | Haleakala | Pan-STARRS 1 | · | 720 m | MPC · JPL |
| 622086 | 2012 HP_{111} | — | April 27, 2012 | Haleakala | Pan-STARRS 1 | EOS | 1.3 km | MPC · JPL |
| 622087 | 2012 JC_{7} | — | August 27, 2009 | Kitt Peak | Spacewatch | · | 650 m | MPC · JPL |
| 622088 | 2012 JD_{16} | — | May 13, 2012 | Mount Lemmon | Mount Lemmon Survey | · | 800 m | MPC · JPL |
| 622089 | 2012 JV_{31} | — | May 15, 2012 | Haleakala | Pan-STARRS 1 | URS | 2.7 km | MPC · JPL |
| 622090 | 2012 JM_{34} | — | May 14, 2012 | Haleakala | Pan-STARRS 1 | V | 480 m | MPC · JPL |
| 622091 | 2012 JS_{35} | — | May 15, 2012 | Haleakala | Pan-STARRS 1 | · | 850 m | MPC · JPL |
| 622092 | 2012 JF_{36} | — | February 7, 2008 | Kitt Peak | Spacewatch | · | 940 m | MPC · JPL |
| 622093 | 2012 JP_{38} | — | May 11, 2012 | Kitt Peak | Spacewatch | · | 2.7 km | MPC · JPL |
| 622094 | 2012 JZ_{39} | — | August 28, 2009 | Kitt Peak | Spacewatch | · | 810 m | MPC · JPL |
| 622095 | 2012 JD_{40} | — | June 21, 2007 | Kitt Peak | Spacewatch | · | 2.8 km | MPC · JPL |
| 622096 | 2012 JL_{42} | — | May 14, 2012 | Mount Lemmon | Mount Lemmon Survey | · | 820 m | MPC · JPL |
| 622097 | 2012 JU_{42} | — | September 12, 2009 | Kitt Peak | Spacewatch | NYS | 730 m | MPC · JPL |
| 622098 | 2012 JF_{44} | — | August 30, 2005 | Palomar | NEAT | · | 1.1 km | MPC · JPL |
| 622099 | 2012 JS_{44} | — | May 15, 2012 | Haleakala | Pan-STARRS 1 | · | 2.4 km | MPC · JPL |
| 622100 | 2012 JZ_{46} | — | April 30, 2012 | Mount Lemmon | Mount Lemmon Survey | · | 2.5 km | MPC · JPL |

== 622101–622200 ==
back to top

| Designation | | | Discovery | | | Properties | | Ref |
| Permanent | Provisional | Named after | Date | Site | Discoverer(s) | Category | Diam. | Ref |
|---|---|---|---|---|---|---|---|---|
| 622101 | 2012 JH_{48} | — | April 21, 2012 | Kitt Peak | Spacewatch | · | 900 m | MPC · JPL |
| 622102 | 2012 JS_{48} | — | May 12, 2012 | Mount Lemmon | Mount Lemmon Survey | · | 760 m | MPC · JPL |
| 622103 | 2012 JE_{49} | — | April 30, 2012 | Mount Lemmon | Mount Lemmon Survey | EOS | 1.2 km | MPC · JPL |
| 622104 | 2012 JY_{55} | — | September 23, 2009 | Kitt Peak | Spacewatch | MAS | 580 m | MPC · JPL |
| 622105 | 2012 JG_{63} | — | August 16, 2009 | Kitt Peak | Spacewatch | · | 730 m | MPC · JPL |
| 622106 | 2012 JE_{70} | — | May 12, 2012 | Mount Lemmon | Mount Lemmon Survey | · | 870 m | MPC · JPL |
| 622107 | 2012 JP_{70} | — | May 1, 2012 | Mount Lemmon | Mount Lemmon Survey | · | 870 m | MPC · JPL |
| 622108 | 2012 JA_{71} | — | May 12, 2012 | Mount Lemmon | Mount Lemmon Survey | PHO | 590 m | MPC · JPL |
| 622109 | 2012 JY_{72} | — | May 14, 2012 | Haleakala | Pan-STARRS 1 | · | 2.2 km | MPC · JPL |
| 622110 | 2012 KW_{7} | — | November 12, 2010 | Mount Lemmon | Mount Lemmon Survey | H | 340 m | MPC · JPL |
| 622111 | 2012 KH_{8} | — | May 1, 2012 | Mount Lemmon | Mount Lemmon Survey | CLA | 1.2 km | MPC · JPL |
| 622112 | 2012 KP_{11} | — | July 30, 2005 | Palomar | NEAT | · | 1.1 km | MPC · JPL |
| 622113 | 2012 KA_{13} | — | April 20, 2012 | Kitt Peak | Spacewatch | · | 870 m | MPC · JPL |
| 622114 | 2012 KB_{17} | — | May 20, 2012 | Mount Lemmon | Mount Lemmon Survey | · | 820 m | MPC · JPL |
| 622115 | 2012 KU_{18} | — | May 16, 2012 | Haleakala | Pan-STARRS 1 | PHO | 740 m | MPC · JPL |
| 622116 | 2012 KT_{24} | — | May 23, 2012 | Mount Lemmon | Mount Lemmon Survey | · | 1.2 km | MPC · JPL |
| 622117 | 2012 KA_{38} | — | May 18, 2012 | Mount Lemmon | Mount Lemmon Survey | ERI | 1.1 km | MPC · JPL |
| 622118 | 2012 KE_{40} | — | April 21, 2012 | Mount Lemmon | Mount Lemmon Survey | · | 730 m | MPC · JPL |
| 622119 | 2012 KN_{59} | — | May 21, 2012 | Haleakala | Pan-STARRS 1 | · | 2.6 km | MPC · JPL |
| 622120 | 2012 KO_{61} | — | July 15, 2013 | Haleakala | Pan-STARRS 1 | · | 1.7 km | MPC · JPL |
| 622121 | 2012 KU_{61} | — | May 29, 2012 | Mount Lemmon | Mount Lemmon Survey | · | 800 m | MPC · JPL |
| 622122 | 2012 KU_{64} | — | May 20, 2012 | Mount Lemmon | Mount Lemmon Survey | · | 2.0 km | MPC · JPL |
| 622123 | 2012 LX | — | October 30, 2002 | Haleakala | NEAT | H | 740 m | MPC · JPL |
| 622124 | 2012 LJ_{9} | — | June 14, 2012 | Mount Lemmon | Mount Lemmon Survey | · | 950 m | MPC · JPL |
| 622125 | 2012 LZ_{17} | — | December 10, 2009 | Mount Lemmon | Mount Lemmon Survey | · | 1.1 km | MPC · JPL |
| 622126 | 2012 LB_{29} | — | June 10, 2018 | Haleakala | Pan-STARRS 1 | · | 2.5 km | MPC · JPL |
| 622127 | 2012 LL_{29} | — | June 11, 2012 | Mount Lemmon | Mount Lemmon Survey | · | 2.8 km | MPC · JPL |
| 622128 | 2012 LV_{29} | — | February 18, 2015 | Mount Lemmon | Mount Lemmon Survey | NYS | 760 m | MPC · JPL |
| 622129 | 2012 MT_{8} | — | May 28, 2012 | Mount Lemmon | Mount Lemmon Survey | · | 860 m | MPC · JPL |
| 622130 | 2012 PJ_{8} | — | December 22, 2008 | Mount Lemmon | Mount Lemmon Survey | · | 2.7 km | MPC · JPL |
| 622131 | 2012 PR_{10} | — | February 1, 2006 | Kitt Peak | Spacewatch | L5 | 8.2 km | MPC · JPL |
| 622132 | 2012 PA_{12} | — | August 10, 2012 | Kitt Peak | Spacewatch | L5 | 6.8 km | MPC · JPL |
| 622133 | 2012 PY_{45} | — | August 14, 2012 | Haleakala | Pan-STARRS 1 | · | 920 m | MPC · JPL |
| 622134 | 2012 PG_{47} | — | March 24, 2015 | Mount Lemmon | Mount Lemmon Survey | MAS | 560 m | MPC · JPL |
| 622135 | 2012 PF_{48} | — | August 28, 2016 | Mount Lemmon | Mount Lemmon Survey | · | 820 m | MPC · JPL |
| 622136 | 2012 PV_{52} | — | August 17, 2018 | Haleakala | Pan-STARRS 1 | · | 2.5 km | MPC · JPL |
| 622137 | 2012 PC_{54} | — | August 11, 2012 | Siding Spring | SSS | · | 920 m | MPC · JPL |
| 622138 | 2012 PA_{57} | — | August 11, 2012 | Siding Spring | SSS | · | 980 m | MPC · JPL |
| 622139 | 2012 QH_{10} | — | August 11, 2012 | Siding Spring | SSS | L5 | 10 km | MPC · JPL |
| 622140 | 2012 QJ_{26} | — | September 19, 2008 | Kitt Peak | Spacewatch | · | 900 m | MPC · JPL |
| 622141 | 2012 QQ_{29} | — | September 29, 2001 | Palomar | NEAT | · | 1.3 km | MPC · JPL |
| 622142 | 2012 QZ_{49} | — | September 17, 2001 | Kitt Peak | Spacewatch | · | 880 m | MPC · JPL |
| 622143 | 2012 QA_{64} | — | August 26, 2012 | Haleakala | Pan-STARRS 1 | L5 | 8.9 km | MPC · JPL |
| 622144 | 2012 QC_{64} | — | August 25, 2012 | Kitt Peak | Spacewatch | L5 | 8.5 km | MPC · JPL |
| 622145 | 2012 QW_{65} | — | August 26, 2012 | Haleakala | Pan-STARRS 1 | · | 960 m | MPC · JPL |
| 622146 | 2012 RF_{4} | — | September 21, 2001 | Palomar | NEAT | · | 2.5 km | MPC · JPL |
| 622147 | 2012 RB_{12} | — | September 11, 2012 | Črni Vrh | Matičič, S. | · | 1.6 km | MPC · JPL |
| 622148 | 2012 RY_{14} | — | September 6, 2012 | Mount Lemmon | Mount Lemmon Survey | · | 1.0 km | MPC · JPL |
| 622149 | 2012 RS_{20} | — | May 15, 2008 | Mount Lemmon | Mount Lemmon Survey | V | 860 m | MPC · JPL |
| 622150 | 2012 RP_{25} | — | August 28, 2012 | Mount Lemmon | Mount Lemmon Survey | L5 | 8.4 km | MPC · JPL |
| 622151 | 2012 RJ_{27} | — | September 6, 2012 | Mount Lemmon | Mount Lemmon Survey | EOS | 1.9 km | MPC · JPL |
| 622152 | 2012 RL_{30} | — | August 14, 2012 | Haleakala | Pan-STARRS 1 | · | 1.1 km | MPC · JPL |
| 622153 | 2012 SE_{3} | — | September 16, 2012 | Kachina | Hobart, J. | PHO | 700 m | MPC · JPL |
| 622154 | 2012 SC_{18} | — | September 17, 2012 | Kitt Peak | Spacewatch | · | 1.3 km | MPC · JPL |
| 622155 | 2012 SF_{39} | — | September 17, 2006 | Catalina | CSS | · | 2.7 km | MPC · JPL |
| 622156 | 2012 SQ_{45} | — | August 21, 2006 | Kitt Peak | Spacewatch | · | 3.1 km | MPC · JPL |
| 622157 | 2012 ST_{45} | — | September 21, 2003 | Kitt Peak | Spacewatch | · | 950 m | MPC · JPL |
| 622158 | 2012 SG_{73} | — | September 19, 2012 | Mount Lemmon | Mount Lemmon Survey | · | 1.1 km | MPC · JPL |
| 622159 | 2012 SV_{88} | — | September 17, 2012 | Mount Lemmon | Mount Lemmon Survey | · | 1.2 km | MPC · JPL |
| 622160 | 2012 TQ_{16} | — | October 4, 2012 | Mount Lemmon | Mount Lemmon Survey | · | 1.3 km | MPC · JPL |
| 622161 | 2012 TO_{42} | — | October 1, 2008 | Kitt Peak | Spacewatch | MAR | 660 m | MPC · JPL |
| 622162 | 2012 TM_{43} | — | October 8, 2012 | Haleakala | Pan-STARRS 1 | EUN | 910 m | MPC · JPL |
| 622163 | 2012 TQ_{51} | — | July 26, 2011 | Haleakala | Pan-STARRS 1 | L5 | 10 km | MPC · JPL |
| 622164 | 2012 TU_{60} | — | October 8, 2012 | Haleakala | Pan-STARRS 1 | L5 | 9.5 km | MPC · JPL |
| 622165 | 2012 TX_{70} | — | October 9, 2012 | Nogales | M. Schwartz, P. R. Holvorcem | · | 1.0 km | MPC · JPL |
| 622166 | 2012 TE_{107} | — | November 1, 2008 | Mount Lemmon | Mount Lemmon Survey | · | 820 m | MPC · JPL |
| 622167 | 2012 TJ_{115} | — | October 10, 2012 | Mount Lemmon | Mount Lemmon Survey | · | 990 m | MPC · JPL |
| 622168 | 2012 TL_{117} | — | September 25, 2008 | Mount Lemmon | Mount Lemmon Survey | · | 1.1 km | MPC · JPL |
| 622169 | 2012 TR_{137} | — | September 4, 2008 | Kitt Peak | Spacewatch | · | 1.1 km | MPC · JPL |
| 622170 | 2012 TJ_{160} | — | October 8, 2012 | Mount Lemmon | Mount Lemmon Survey | · | 1 km | MPC · JPL |
| 622171 | 2012 TQ_{172} | — | September 22, 2008 | Mount Lemmon | Mount Lemmon Survey | · | 1.1 km | MPC · JPL |
| 622172 | 2012 TE_{208} | — | October 11, 2012 | Kitt Peak | Spacewatch | · | 2.6 km | MPC · JPL |
| 622173 | 2012 TO_{247} | — | October 11, 2006 | Palomar | NEAT | · | 2.4 km | MPC · JPL |
| 622174 | 2012 TS_{256} | — | August 2, 2011 | Haleakala | Pan-STARRS 1 | L5 | 8.1 km | MPC · JPL |
| 622175 | 2012 TR_{288} | — | August 27, 2006 | Kitt Peak | Spacewatch | TIR | 2.2 km | MPC · JPL |
| 622176 | 2012 TU_{319} | — | October 9, 2012 | Haleakala | Pan-STARRS 1 | TIR | 2.7 km | MPC · JPL |
| 622177 | 2012 TP_{324} | — | October 10, 2012 | Haleakala | Pan-STARRS 1 | H | 530 m | MPC · JPL |
| 622178 | 2012 TE_{330} | — | October 14, 2012 | Kitt Peak | Spacewatch | · | 1.1 km | MPC · JPL |
| 622179 | 2012 TS_{350} | — | January 12, 2018 | Haleakala | Pan-STARRS 1 | · | 920 m | MPC · JPL |
| 622180 | 2012 TP_{366} | — | October 7, 2012 | Kitt Peak | Spacewatch | · | 2.7 km | MPC · JPL |
| 622181 | 2012 UA_{29} | — | October 16, 2012 | Haleakala | Pan-STARRS 1 | · | 1.7 km | MPC · JPL |
| 622182 | 2012 UV_{32} | — | October 29, 2008 | Mount Lemmon | Mount Lemmon Survey | · | 1.3 km | MPC · JPL |
| 622183 | 2012 UG_{90} | — | October 14, 2012 | Kitt Peak | Spacewatch | · | 1.2 km | MPC · JPL |
| 622184 | 2012 UT_{127} | — | November 16, 2001 | Kitt Peak | Spacewatch | T_{j} (2.95) | 2.4 km | MPC · JPL |
| 622185 | 2012 UN_{135} | — | September 11, 2012 | Siding Spring | SSS | · | 1.1 km | MPC · JPL |
| 622186 | 2012 UX_{156} | — | October 17, 2012 | Mount Lemmon | Mount Lemmon Survey | · | 840 m | MPC · JPL |
| 622187 | 2012 UG_{157} | — | October 22, 2008 | Kitt Peak | Spacewatch | HNS | 770 m | MPC · JPL |
| 622188 | 2012 UR_{179} | — | November 1, 2008 | Mount Lemmon | Mount Lemmon Survey | · | 790 m | MPC · JPL |
| 622189 | 2012 UO_{188} | — | October 23, 2012 | Kitt Peak | Spacewatch | · | 1.1 km | MPC · JPL |
| 622190 | 2012 UR_{206} | — | September 26, 1995 | Kitt Peak | Spacewatch | MAR | 630 m | MPC · JPL |
| 622191 | 2012 UW_{206} | — | October 18, 2012 | Haleakala | Pan-STARRS 1 | · | 730 m | MPC · JPL |
| 622192 | 2012 UY_{206} | — | October 22, 2012 | Haleakala | Pan-STARRS 1 | HNS | 720 m | MPC · JPL |
| 622193 | 2012 UN_{221} | — | October 22, 2012 | Haleakala | Pan-STARRS 1 | · | 1.2 km | MPC · JPL |
| 622194 | 2012 UV_{222} | — | October 17, 2012 | Haleakala | Pan-STARRS 1 | · | 750 m | MPC · JPL |
| 622195 | 2012 UJ_{225} | — | October 19, 2012 | Mount Lemmon | Mount Lemmon Survey | · | 830 m | MPC · JPL |
| 622196 | 2012 VV_{18} | — | September 3, 2008 | Kitt Peak | Spacewatch | · | 1.0 km | MPC · JPL |
| 622197 | 2012 VE_{49} | — | September 20, 2008 | Catalina | CSS | · | 920 m | MPC · JPL |
| 622198 | 2012 VO_{95} | — | October 24, 2008 | Kitt Peak | Spacewatch | · | 860 m | MPC · JPL |
| 622199 | 2012 VU_{95} | — | May 20, 2006 | Kitt Peak | Spacewatch | · | 1.5 km | MPC · JPL |
| 622200 | 2012 VD_{98} | — | October 27, 2012 | Haleakala | Pan-STARRS 1 | BAR | 1.1 km | MPC · JPL |

== 622201–622300 ==
back to top

| Designation | | | Discovery | | | Properties | | Ref |
| Permanent | Provisional | Named after | Date | Site | Discoverer(s) | Category | Diam. | Ref |
|---|---|---|---|---|---|---|---|---|
| 622201 | 2012 VB_{102} | — | October 22, 2012 | Haleakala | Pan-STARRS 1 | · | 1.1 km | MPC · JPL |
| 622202 | 2012 VY_{127} | — | November 14, 2012 | Kitt Peak | Spacewatch | · | 1.1 km | MPC · JPL |
| 622203 | 2012 VG_{130} | — | November 7, 2012 | Haleakala | Pan-STARRS 1 | · | 850 m | MPC · JPL |
| 622204 | 2012 WM_{34} | — | November 26, 2012 | Mount Lemmon | Mount Lemmon Survey | EUN | 900 m | MPC · JPL |
| 622205 | 2012 WT_{38} | — | November 20, 2012 | Mount Lemmon | Mount Lemmon Survey | · | 1.1 km | MPC · JPL |
| 622206 | 2012 XF_{3} | — | October 2, 1999 | Kitt Peak | Spacewatch | (5) | 1.0 km | MPC · JPL |
| 622207 | 2012 XY_{4} | — | December 4, 2012 | Mount Lemmon | Mount Lemmon Survey | · | 830 m | MPC · JPL |
| 622208 | 2012 XZ_{35} | — | January 2, 2009 | Mount Lemmon | Mount Lemmon Survey | · | 1.2 km | MPC · JPL |
| 622209 | 2012 XO_{61} | — | November 7, 2012 | Mount Lemmon | Mount Lemmon Survey | EUN | 720 m | MPC · JPL |
| 622210 | 2012 XE_{86} | — | November 14, 2012 | Nogales | M. Schwartz, P. R. Holvorcem | · | 1.3 km | MPC · JPL |
| 622211 | 2012 XK_{91} | — | November 12, 2012 | Mount Lemmon | Mount Lemmon Survey | · | 800 m | MPC · JPL |
| 622212 | 2012 XX_{94} | — | December 4, 2012 | Mount Lemmon | Mount Lemmon Survey | · | 870 m | MPC · JPL |
| 622213 | 2012 XZ_{98} | — | December 4, 2008 | Mount Lemmon | Mount Lemmon Survey | · | 1.5 km | MPC · JPL |
| 622214 | 2012 XG_{109} | — | November 26, 2012 | Mount Lemmon | Mount Lemmon Survey | · | 1.1 km | MPC · JPL |
| 622215 | 2012 XW_{114} | — | December 6, 2012 | Nogales | M. Schwartz, P. R. Holvorcem | HNS | 1.3 km | MPC · JPL |
| 622216 | 2012 XO_{119} | — | November 19, 2003 | Palomar | NEAT | · | 2.8 km | MPC · JPL |
| 622217 | 2012 XB_{143} | — | December 7, 2012 | Haleakala | Pan-STARRS 1 | · | 800 m | MPC · JPL |
| 622218 | 2012 XA_{144} | — | November 26, 2012 | Mount Lemmon | Mount Lemmon Survey | · | 860 m | MPC · JPL |
| 622219 | 2012 XT_{168} | — | December 6, 2012 | Mount Lemmon | Mount Lemmon Survey | · | 1.3 km | MPC · JPL |
| 622220 | 2013 AP_{17} | — | June 8, 2011 | Haleakala | Pan-STARRS 1 | HNS | 1.2 km | MPC · JPL |
| 622221 | 2013 AP_{25} | — | July 7, 2003 | Kitt Peak | Spacewatch | H | 570 m | MPC · JPL |
| 622222 | 2013 AC_{28} | — | September 30, 2006 | Mount Lemmon | Mount Lemmon Survey | · | 2.2 km | MPC · JPL |
| 622223 | 2013 AN_{35} | — | January 5, 2013 | Kitt Peak | Spacewatch | · | 1.1 km | MPC · JPL |
| 622224 | 2013 AR_{54} | — | March 30, 2009 | Mount Lemmon | Mount Lemmon Survey | · | 1.6 km | MPC · JPL |
| 622225 | 2013 AK_{104} | — | November 15, 2012 | Mount Lemmon | Mount Lemmon Survey | HNS | 900 m | MPC · JPL |
| 622226 | 2013 AB_{125} | — | April 30, 2009 | Kitt Peak | Spacewatch | · | 1.7 km | MPC · JPL |
| 622227 | 2013 AW_{141} | — | January 4, 2013 | Cerro Tololo-DECam | DECam | · | 1.7 km | MPC · JPL |
| 622228 | 2013 AH_{148} | — | May 4, 2005 | Mauna Kea | Veillet, C. | · | 1.1 km | MPC · JPL |
| 622229 | 2013 AN_{155} | — | January 4, 2013 | Cerro Tololo-DECam | DECam | · | 1.7 km | MPC · JPL |
| 622230 | 2013 AW_{160} | — | January 20, 2013 | Mount Lemmon | Mount Lemmon Survey | MAR | 930 m | MPC · JPL |
| 622231 | 2013 AU_{166} | — | January 4, 2013 | Cerro Tololo-DECam | DECam | · | 1.3 km | MPC · JPL |
| 622232 | 2013 AP_{172} | — | August 22, 2003 | Palomar | NEAT | · | 880 m | MPC · JPL |
| 622233 | 2013 AB_{173} | — | January 4, 2013 | Cerro Tololo-DECam | DECam | · | 1.1 km | MPC · JPL |
| 622234 | 2013 AY_{186} | — | December 9, 2012 | Mount Lemmon | Mount Lemmon Survey | HNS | 830 m | MPC · JPL |
| 622235 | 2013 BN_{7} | — | September 23, 2003 | Haleakala | NEAT | · | 1.2 km | MPC · JPL |
| 622236 | 2013 BR_{35} | — | July 8, 2003 | Palomar | NEAT | · | 1.1 km | MPC · JPL |
| 622237 | 2013 BC_{59} | — | January 7, 2013 | Oukaïmeden | M. Ory | · | 1.3 km | MPC · JPL |
| 622238 | 2013 BR_{81} | — | January 17, 2013 | Haleakala | Pan-STARRS 1 | · | 1.5 km | MPC · JPL |
| 622239 | 2013 BK_{94} | — | January 18, 2013 | Mount Lemmon | Mount Lemmon Survey | AGN | 940 m | MPC · JPL |
| 622240 | 2013 BP_{95} | — | January 18, 2013 | Mount Lemmon | Mount Lemmon Survey | HOF | 2.1 km | MPC · JPL |
| 622241 | 2013 CA_{42} | — | February 3, 2013 | Haleakala | Pan-STARRS 1 | · | 1.4 km | MPC · JPL |
| 622242 | 2013 CR_{111} | — | September 17, 2006 | Kitt Peak | Spacewatch | HOF | 1.9 km | MPC · JPL |
| 622243 | 2013 CS_{125} | — | January 14, 2013 | Mount Lemmon | Mount Lemmon Survey | · | 1.5 km | MPC · JPL |
| 622244 | 2013 CO_{172} | — | April 21, 2009 | Mount Lemmon | Mount Lemmon Survey | (21344) | 1.2 km | MPC · JPL |
| 622245 | 2013 CR_{249} | — | February 9, 2013 | Haleakala | Pan-STARRS 1 | · | 1.2 km | MPC · JPL |
| 622246 | 2013 DJ_{21} | — | February 16, 2013 | Mount Lemmon | Mount Lemmon Survey | GAL | 1.4 km | MPC · JPL |
| 622247 | 2013 EM_{1} | — | February 14, 2013 | Haleakala | Pan-STARRS 1 | HNS | 950 m | MPC · JPL |
| 622248 | 2013 EN_{44} | — | November 24, 2011 | Haleakala | Pan-STARRS 1 | KOR | 1.1 km | MPC · JPL |
| 622249 | 2013 EN_{48} | — | March 6, 2013 | Haleakala | Pan-STARRS 1 | KOR | 1.1 km | MPC · JPL |
| 622250 | 2013 EJ_{60} | — | March 8, 2013 | Haleakala | Pan-STARRS 1 | KOR | 1.0 km | MPC · JPL |
| 622251 | 2013 EN_{69} | — | September 15, 2007 | Mount Lemmon | Mount Lemmon Survey | L4 | 7.4 km | MPC · JPL |
| 622252 | 2013 EW_{131} | — | October 9, 2010 | Mount Lemmon | Mount Lemmon Survey | · | 1.9 km | MPC · JPL |
| 622253 | 2013 EY_{132} | — | March 12, 2013 | Kitt Peak | Research and Education Collaborative Occultation Network | · | 420 m | MPC · JPL |
| 622254 | 2013 ES_{149} | — | April 10, 2013 | Haleakala | Pan-STARRS 1 | · | 1.0 km | MPC · JPL |
| 622255 | 2013 EC_{160} | — | March 4, 2013 | Haleakala | Pan-STARRS 1 | · | 1.6 km | MPC · JPL |
| 622256 | 2013 ES_{160} | — | May 7, 2014 | Haleakala | Pan-STARRS 1 | · | 1.6 km | MPC · JPL |
| 622257 | 2013 EP_{172} | — | March 13, 2013 | Haleakala | Pan-STARRS 1 | · | 1.6 km | MPC · JPL |
| 622258 | 2013 FJ_{33} | — | March 16, 2013 | Kitt Peak | Spacewatch | · | 1.2 km | MPC · JPL |
| 622259 | 2013 GJ_{18} | — | April 5, 2013 | Elena Remote | Oreshko, A. | · | 470 m | MPC · JPL |
| 622260 | 2013 GN_{19} | — | March 13, 2013 | Palomar | Palomar Transient Factory | · | 1.5 km | MPC · JPL |
| 622261 | 2013 GU_{20} | — | May 25, 2007 | Mount Lemmon | Mount Lemmon Survey | · | 660 m | MPC · JPL |
| 622262 | 2013 GP_{51} | — | April 10, 2013 | Mount Lemmon | Mount Lemmon Survey | · | 1.5 km | MPC · JPL |
| 622263 | 2013 GY_{79} | — | April 27, 2008 | Kitt Peak | Spacewatch | H | 340 m | MPC · JPL |
| 622264 | 2013 GT_{126} | — | March 14, 2013 | Mount Lemmon | Mount Lemmon Survey | · | 540 m | MPC · JPL |
| 622265 | 2013 GE_{133} | — | April 2, 2013 | Mount Lemmon | Mount Lemmon Survey | H | 360 m | MPC · JPL |
| 622266 | 2013 GN_{142} | — | April 13, 2013 | Haleakala | Pan-STARRS 1 | · | 530 m | MPC · JPL |
| 622267 | 2013 GF_{144} | — | April 12, 2013 | Haleakala | Pan-STARRS 1 | · | 550 m | MPC · JPL |
| 622268 | 2013 GG_{157} | — | April 1, 2013 | Mount Lemmon | Mount Lemmon Survey | KOR | 1.1 km | MPC · JPL |
| 622269 | 2013 HT_{2} | — | April 4, 2013 | Siding Spring | SSS | · | 640 m | MPC · JPL |
| 622270 | 2013 HP_{5} | — | January 30, 2008 | Kitt Peak | Spacewatch | JUN | 1.1 km | MPC · JPL |
| 622271 | 2013 HZ_{41} | — | April 9, 2013 | Haleakala | Pan-STARRS 1 | · | 410 m | MPC · JPL |
| 622272 | 2013 HU_{65} | — | October 11, 2010 | Mount Lemmon | Mount Lemmon Survey | · | 1.3 km | MPC · JPL |
| 622273 | 2013 HA_{72} | — | April 16, 2013 | Cerro Tololo-DECam | DECam | · | 1.3 km | MPC · JPL |
| 622274 | 2013 HR_{101} | — | October 7, 2005 | Mount Lemmon | Mount Lemmon Survey | 615 | 1 km | MPC · JPL |
| 622275 | 2013 HO_{102} | — | April 16, 2013 | Cerro Tololo-DECam | DECam | KOR | 900 m | MPC · JPL |
| 622276 | 2013 HD_{104} | — | April 16, 2013 | Cerro Tololo-DECam | DECam | · | 580 m | MPC · JPL |
| 622277 | 2013 HQ_{104} | — | April 16, 2013 | Cerro Tololo-DECam | DECam | · | 1.2 km | MPC · JPL |
| 622278 | 2013 HM_{105} | — | October 25, 2005 | Kitt Peak | Spacewatch | · | 1.2 km | MPC · JPL |
| 622279 | 2013 HP_{133} | — | October 28, 2010 | Mount Lemmon | Mount Lemmon Survey | KOR | 830 m | MPC · JPL |
| 622280 | 2013 HF_{142} | — | October 29, 2005 | Mount Lemmon | Mount Lemmon Survey | · | 1.5 km | MPC · JPL |
| 622281 | 2013 HS_{146} | — | September 4, 2010 | Kitt Peak | Spacewatch | KOR | 1.1 km | MPC · JPL |
| 622282 | 2013 HL_{149} | — | February 13, 2008 | Mount Lemmon | Mount Lemmon Survey | · | 1.6 km | MPC · JPL |
| 622283 | 2013 HD_{160} | — | July 13, 2002 | Socorro | LINEAR | · | 2.8 km | MPC · JPL |
| 622284 | 2013 JV_{31} | — | May 12, 2013 | Kitt Peak | Spacewatch | · | 2.3 km | MPC · JPL |
| 622285 | 2013 JJ_{50} | — | April 15, 2013 | Haleakala | Pan-STARRS 1 | · | 1.8 km | MPC · JPL |
| 622286 | 2013 JG_{55} | — | May 8, 2013 | Haleakala | Pan-STARRS 1 | EOS | 1.6 km | MPC · JPL |
| 622287 | 2013 JW_{72} | — | June 30, 2014 | Haleakala | Pan-STARRS 1 | · | 1.9 km | MPC · JPL |
| 622288 | 2013 JQ_{74} | — | May 8, 2013 | Haleakala | Pan-STARRS 1 | · | 460 m | MPC · JPL |
| 622289 | 2013 JL_{76} | — | May 8, 2013 | Haleakala | Pan-STARRS 1 | · | 2.5 km | MPC · JPL |
| 622290 | 2013 KU | — | April 13, 2013 | Haleakala | Pan-STARRS 1 | · | 550 m | MPC · JPL |
| 622291 | 2013 KG_{5} | — | May 16, 2013 | Haleakala | Pan-STARRS 1 | · | 650 m | MPC · JPL |
| 622292 | 2013 KK_{20} | — | May 16, 2013 | Mount Lemmon | Mount Lemmon Survey | · | 1.5 km | MPC · JPL |
| 622293 | 2013 LP_{1} | — | June 2, 2013 | Elena Remote | Oreshko, A. | · | 1.7 km | MPC · JPL |
| 622294 | 2013 LH_{13} | — | November 5, 2007 | Kitt Peak | Spacewatch | · | 520 m | MPC · JPL |
| 622295 | 2013 LW_{15} | — | August 1, 2010 | La Sagra | OAM | · | 500 m | MPC · JPL |
| 622296 | 2013 LM_{30} | — | August 13, 2010 | Kitt Peak | Spacewatch | · | 440 m | MPC · JPL |
| 622297 | 2013 LP_{30} | — | September 14, 2006 | Palomar | NEAT | · | 940 m | MPC · JPL |
| 622298 | 2013 LZ_{37} | — | June 5, 2013 | Mount Lemmon | Mount Lemmon Survey | · | 1.4 km | MPC · JPL |
| 622299 | 2013 LA_{39} | — | June 5, 2013 | Mount Lemmon | Mount Lemmon Survey | · | 1.1 km | MPC · JPL |
| 622300 | 2013 LQ_{40} | — | June 12, 2013 | Haleakala | Pan-STARRS 1 | · | 430 m | MPC · JPL |

== 622301–622400 ==
back to top

| Designation | | | Discovery | | | Properties | | Ref |
| Permanent | Provisional | Named after | Date | Site | Discoverer(s) | Category | Diam. | Ref |
|---|---|---|---|---|---|---|---|---|
| 622301 | 2013 MN_{9} | — | February 20, 2009 | Kitt Peak | Spacewatch | · | 620 m | MPC · JPL |
| 622302 | 2013 MM_{21} | — | June 18, 2013 | Haleakala | Pan-STARRS 1 | EOS | 1.3 km | MPC · JPL |
| 622303 | 2013 NR | — | June 17, 2013 | Kitt Peak | Spacewatch | H | 440 m | MPC · JPL |
| 622304 | 2013 NV_{7} | — | November 3, 2010 | Mount Lemmon | Mount Lemmon Survey | · | 560 m | MPC · JPL |
| 622305 | 2013 NP_{10} | — | July 2, 2013 | Haleakala | Pan-STARRS 1 | EOS | 1.1 km | MPC · JPL |
| 622306 | 2013 NG_{14} | — | July 13, 2013 | Haleakala | Pan-STARRS 1 | · | 2.3 km | MPC · JPL |
| 622307 | 2013 NH_{16} | — | July 13, 2013 | Mount Lemmon | Mount Lemmon Survey | · | 1.6 km | MPC · JPL |
| 622308 | 2013 NT_{19} | — | August 14, 2006 | Siding Spring | SSS | · | 700 m | MPC · JPL |
| 622309 | 2013 NY_{27} | — | September 19, 2003 | Kitt Peak | Spacewatch | · | 1.7 km | MPC · JPL |
| 622310 | 2013 NG_{36} | — | July 1, 2013 | Haleakala | Pan-STARRS 1 | · | 540 m | MPC · JPL |
| 622311 | 2013 NQ_{38} | — | July 15, 2013 | Haleakala | Pan-STARRS 1 | · | 2.3 km | MPC · JPL |
| 622312 | 2013 NW_{39} | — | September 3, 2008 | Kitt Peak | Spacewatch | · | 2.0 km | MPC · JPL |
| 622313 | 2013 NC_{43} | — | September 22, 2014 | Haleakala | Pan-STARRS 1 | · | 1.5 km | MPC · JPL |
| 622314 | 2013 NY_{48} | — | July 13, 2013 | Haleakala | Pan-STARRS 1 | EOS | 1.5 km | MPC · JPL |
| 622315 | 2013 NJ_{56} | — | July 2, 2013 | Haleakala | Pan-STARRS 1 | · | 520 m | MPC · JPL |
| 622316 | 2013 NT_{67} | — | July 14, 2013 | Haleakala | Pan-STARRS 1 | (31811) | 2.1 km | MPC · JPL |
| 622317 | 2013 OD | — | November 3, 2010 | Mount Lemmon | Mount Lemmon Survey | · | 520 m | MPC · JPL |
| 622318 | 2013 PB_{17} | — | July 30, 2003 | Campo Imperatore | CINEOS | · | 650 m | MPC · JPL |
| 622319 | 2013 PK_{17} | — | August 6, 2013 | Elena Remote | Oreshko, A. | · | 1.4 km | MPC · JPL |
| 622320 | 2013 PT_{21} | — | August 7, 2013 | Haleakala | Pan-STARRS 1 | EOS | 1.5 km | MPC · JPL |
| 622321 | 2013 PD_{23} | — | December 5, 2010 | Kitt Peak | Spacewatch | · | 1.0 km | MPC · JPL |
| 622322 | 2013 PM_{33} | — | October 9, 2008 | Mount Lemmon | Mount Lemmon Survey | HYG | 2.2 km | MPC · JPL |
| 622323 | 2013 PL_{35} | — | July 28, 2013 | Kitt Peak | Spacewatch | · | 550 m | MPC · JPL |
| 622324 | 2013 PX_{37} | — | August 28, 2006 | Catalina | CSS | · | 620 m | MPC · JPL |
| 622325 | 2013 PD_{38} | — | August 12, 2013 | Haleakala | Pan-STARRS 1 | · | 1.8 km | MPC · JPL |
| 622326 | 2013 PN_{49} | — | August 8, 2013 | Kitt Peak | Spacewatch | · | 720 m | MPC · JPL |
| 622327 | 2013 PO_{50} | — | August 1, 2013 | Haleakala | Pan-STARRS 1 | H | 420 m | MPC · JPL |
| 622328 | 2013 PH_{59} | — | September 1, 2010 | Mount Lemmon | Mount Lemmon Survey | · | 530 m | MPC · JPL |
| 622329 | 2013 PT_{61} | — | September 28, 2008 | Catalina | CSS | · | 2.0 km | MPC · JPL |
| 622330 | 2013 PA_{62} | — | July 15, 2013 | Haleakala | Pan-STARRS 1 | (2076) | 520 m | MPC · JPL |
| 622331 | 2013 PS_{66} | — | August 12, 2013 | Haleakala | Pan-STARRS 1 | H | 310 m | MPC · JPL |
| 622332 | 2013 PJ_{79} | — | October 8, 2008 | Mount Lemmon | Mount Lemmon Survey | HYG | 1.8 km | MPC · JPL |
| 622333 | 2013 PX_{81} | — | October 8, 2008 | Kitt Peak | Spacewatch | · | 1.6 km | MPC · JPL |
| 622334 | 2013 PT_{83} | — | August 12, 2013 | Haleakala | Pan-STARRS 1 | V | 360 m | MPC · JPL |
| 622335 | 2013 PT_{108} | — | August 15, 2013 | Haleakala | Pan-STARRS 1 | · | 610 m | MPC · JPL |
| 622336 | 2013 PX_{125} | — | August 15, 2013 | Haleakala | Pan-STARRS 1 | · | 1.9 km | MPC · JPL |
| 622337 | 2013 QO_{12} | — | July 30, 2013 | Palomar | Palomar Transient Factory | · | 710 m | MPC · JPL |
| 622338 | 2013 QY_{18} | — | October 7, 2008 | Mount Lemmon | Mount Lemmon Survey | · | 1.9 km | MPC · JPL |
| 622339 | 2013 QE_{23} | — | August 9, 2013 | Kitt Peak | Spacewatch | · | 560 m | MPC · JPL |
| 622340 | 2013 QK_{31} | — | October 8, 2008 | Kitt Peak | Spacewatch | · | 1.8 km | MPC · JPL |
| 622341 | 2013 QC_{46} | — | November 9, 2006 | Kitt Peak | Spacewatch | ERI | 1.1 km | MPC · JPL |
| 622342 | 2013 QU_{48} | — | October 6, 2008 | Kitt Peak | Spacewatch | · | 2.1 km | MPC · JPL |
| 622343 | 2013 QM_{55} | — | October 7, 2008 | Mount Lemmon | Mount Lemmon Survey | · | 1.8 km | MPC · JPL |
| 622344 | 2013 QN_{57} | — | September 26, 2002 | Palomar | NEAT | · | 1.2 km | MPC · JPL |
| 622345 | 2013 QG_{58} | — | August 26, 2013 | Haleakala | Pan-STARRS 1 | · | 500 m | MPC · JPL |
| 622346 | 2013 QW_{58} | — | August 10, 2013 | Kitt Peak | Spacewatch | V | 450 m | MPC · JPL |
| 622347 | 2013 QQ_{59} | — | August 9, 2013 | Kitt Peak | Spacewatch | V | 450 m | MPC · JPL |
| 622348 | 2013 QB_{62} | — | August 27, 2013 | Haleakala | Pan-STARRS 1 | V | 480 m | MPC · JPL |
| 622349 | 2013 QS_{68} | — | August 8, 2013 | Kitt Peak | Spacewatch | · | 580 m | MPC · JPL |
| 622350 | 2013 QV_{68} | — | September 12, 2002 | Palomar | NEAT | · | 2.5 km | MPC · JPL |
| 622351 | 2013 QA_{76} | — | October 8, 2008 | Kitt Peak | Spacewatch | HYG | 2.1 km | MPC · JPL |
| 622352 | 2013 QG_{83} | — | August 26, 2013 | Haleakala | Pan-STARRS 1 | PHO | 830 m | MPC · JPL |
| 622353 | 2013 QE_{92} | — | June 20, 2013 | Haleakala | Pan-STARRS 1 | · | 1.9 km | MPC · JPL |
| 622354 | 2013 QL_{98} | — | August 27, 2013 | Haleakala | Pan-STARRS 1 | · | 2.8 km | MPC · JPL |
| 622355 | 2013 QK_{102} | — | August 29, 2013 | Haleakala | Pan-STARRS 1 | · | 530 m | MPC · JPL |
| 622356 | 2013 RE_{12} | — | August 12, 2013 | Haleakala | Pan-STARRS 1 | · | 1.8 km | MPC · JPL |
| 622357 | 2013 RN_{19} | — | September 3, 2013 | Piszkéstető | K. Sárneczky | PHO | 700 m | MPC · JPL |
| 622358 | 2013 RQ_{29} | — | October 23, 2008 | Kitt Peak | Spacewatch | THM | 2.1 km | MPC · JPL |
| 622359 | 2013 RV_{31} | — | November 3, 2008 | Mount Lemmon | Mount Lemmon Survey | · | 2.1 km | MPC · JPL |
| 622360 | 2013 RK_{41} | — | September 5, 2013 | Kitt Peak | Spacewatch | · | 520 m | MPC · JPL |
| 622361 | 2013 RF_{44} | — | October 6, 2008 | Mount Lemmon | Mount Lemmon Survey | · | 1.9 km | MPC · JPL |
| 622362 | 2013 RX_{46} | — | May 31, 2009 | Cerro Burek | I. de la Cueva | · | 910 m | MPC · JPL |
| 622363 | 2013 RP_{50} | — | August 29, 2006 | Catalina | CSS | (2076) | 630 m | MPC · JPL |
| 622364 | 2013 RR_{58} | — | December 25, 2010 | Mount Lemmon | Mount Lemmon Survey | · | 700 m | MPC · JPL |
| 622365 | 2013 RU_{64} | — | May 12, 2012 | Mount Lemmon | Mount Lemmon Survey | · | 2.3 km | MPC · JPL |
| 622366 | 2013 RD_{67} | — | October 27, 2008 | Kitt Peak | Spacewatch | · | 1.8 km | MPC · JPL |
| 622367 | 2013 RC_{69} | — | August 23, 2007 | Kitt Peak | Spacewatch | HYG | 2.3 km | MPC · JPL |
| 622368 | 2013 RZ_{80} | — | March 31, 2012 | Kitt Peak | Spacewatch | · | 1.9 km | MPC · JPL |
| 622369 | 2013 RZ_{86} | — | September 17, 2006 | Kitt Peak | Spacewatch | · | 640 m | MPC · JPL |
| 622370 | 2013 RH_{102} | — | April 27, 2012 | Haleakala | Pan-STARRS 1 | · | 2.2 km | MPC · JPL |
| 622371 | 2013 RU_{104} | — | September 5, 2013 | Kitt Peak | Spacewatch | · | 2.2 km | MPC · JPL |
| 622372 | 2013 RU_{110} | — | September 15, 2013 | Haleakala | Pan-STARRS 1 | · | 970 m | MPC · JPL |
| 622373 | 2013 RC_{113} | — | September 10, 2013 | Haleakala | Pan-STARRS 1 | · | 580 m | MPC · JPL |
| 622374 | 2013 RJ_{116} | — | September 6, 2013 | Mount Lemmon | Mount Lemmon Survey | PHO | 870 m | MPC · JPL |
| 622375 | 2013 RL_{120} | — | September 1, 2013 | Haleakala | Pan-STARRS 1 | · | 2.4 km | MPC · JPL |
| 622376 | 2013 RP_{130} | — | September 5, 2013 | Kitt Peak | Spacewatch | V | 470 m | MPC · JPL |
| 622377 | 2013 RA_{132} | — | September 15, 2013 | Haleakala | Pan-STARRS 1 | · | 1.9 km | MPC · JPL |
| 622378 | 2013 SB | — | August 18, 2002 | Palomar | NEAT | NYS | 800 m | MPC · JPL |
| 622379 | 2013 SN_{14} | — | August 30, 2006 | Anderson Mesa | LONEOS | · | 610 m | MPC · JPL |
| 622380 | 2013 SJ_{19} | — | October 16, 2006 | Catalina | CSS | · | 530 m | MPC · JPL |
| 622381 | 2013 SO_{22} | — | September 27, 2013 | Palomar | Palomar Transient Factory | · | 2.5 km | MPC · JPL |
| 622382 | 2013 ST_{33} | — | March 28, 2012 | Mount Lemmon | Mount Lemmon Survey | · | 790 m | MPC · JPL |
| 622383 | 2013 ST_{37} | — | September 6, 2013 | Catalina | CSS | · | 490 m | MPC · JPL |
| 622384 | 2013 SS_{38} | — | October 3, 2008 | Kitt Peak | Spacewatch | · | 1.4 km | MPC · JPL |
| 622385 | 2013 SD_{45} | — | September 3, 2013 | Haleakala | Pan-STARRS 1 | H | 360 m | MPC · JPL |
| 622386 | 2013 SN_{46} | — | August 17, 2006 | Palomar | NEAT | · | 600 m | MPC · JPL |
| 622387 | 2013 SK_{53} | — | November 1, 2008 | Mount Lemmon | Mount Lemmon Survey | · | 2.0 km | MPC · JPL |
| 622388 | 2013 SU_{54} | — | September 2, 2013 | Mount Lemmon | Mount Lemmon Survey | · | 580 m | MPC · JPL |
| 622389 | 2013 SC_{70} | — | September 27, 2006 | Kitt Peak | Spacewatch | · | 710 m | MPC · JPL |
| 622390 | 2013 SP_{75} | — | September 14, 2006 | Kitt Peak | Spacewatch | · | 600 m | MPC · JPL |
| 622391 | 2013 SH_{86} | — | August 24, 2006 | Palomar | NEAT | · | 540 m | MPC · JPL |
| 622392 | 2013 SS_{98} | — | September 10, 2013 | Haleakala | Pan-STARRS 1 | PHO | 530 m | MPC · JPL |
| 622393 | 2013 SD_{109} | — | September 28, 2013 | Mount Lemmon | Mount Lemmon Survey | · | 930 m | MPC · JPL |
| 622394 | 2013 SH_{109} | — | September 23, 2013 | Haleakala | Pan-STARRS 1 | · | 720 m | MPC · JPL |
| 622395 | 2013 TQ_{3} | — | October 1, 2013 | Palomar | Palomar Transient Factory | · | 3.0 km | MPC · JPL |
| 622396 | 2013 TZ_{6} | — | August 18, 2006 | Kitt Peak | Spacewatch | · | 640 m | MPC · JPL |
| 622397 | 2013 TR_{10} | — | September 25, 2013 | Catalina | CSS | · | 1.2 km | MPC · JPL |
| 622398 Fraser | 2013 TF_{19} | Fraser | August 31, 2013 | Tincana | M. Kusiak, M. Żołnowski | · | 560 m | MPC · JPL |
| 622399 | 2013 TU_{21} | — | August 20, 2006 | Palomar | NEAT | · | 460 m | MPC · JPL |
| 622400 | 2013 TL_{23} | — | September 14, 2002 | Palomar | NEAT | · | 670 m | MPC · JPL |

== 622401–622500 ==
back to top

| Designation | | | Discovery | | | Properties | | Ref |
| Permanent | Provisional | Named after | Date | Site | Discoverer(s) | Category | Diam. | Ref |
|---|---|---|---|---|---|---|---|---|
| 622401 | 2013 TD_{24} | — | April 8, 2008 | Kitt Peak | Spacewatch | L5 | 9.4 km | MPC · JPL |
| 622402 | 2013 TJ_{25} | — | February 21, 2007 | Kitt Peak | Spacewatch | L5 | 7.0 km | MPC · JPL |
| 622403 | 2013 TC_{28} | — | October 19, 2006 | Kitt Peak | Spacewatch | V | 520 m | MPC · JPL |
| 622404 | 2013 TY_{34} | — | October 27, 2003 | Kitt Peak | Spacewatch | · | 460 m | MPC · JPL |
| 622405 | 2013 TM_{36} | — | October 11, 2006 | Pla D'Arguines | R. Ferrando, Ferrando, M. | (2076) | 590 m | MPC · JPL |
| 622406 | 2013 TJ_{46} | — | February 28, 2012 | Haleakala | Pan-STARRS 1 | · | 870 m | MPC · JPL |
| 622407 | 2013 TZ_{49} | — | October 30, 2008 | Kitt Peak | Spacewatch | · | 1.6 km | MPC · JPL |
| 622408 | 2013 TK_{54} | — | October 4, 2013 | Mount Lemmon | Mount Lemmon Survey | · | 460 m | MPC · JPL |
| 622409 | 2013 TM_{81} | — | October 1, 2013 | Mount Lemmon | Mount Lemmon Survey | H | 300 m | MPC · JPL |
| 622410 | 2013 TF_{84} | — | October 23, 2006 | Kitt Peak | Spacewatch | · | 930 m | MPC · JPL |
| 622411 | 2013 TH_{93} | — | September 14, 2013 | Mount Lemmon | Mount Lemmon Survey | · | 610 m | MPC · JPL |
| 622412 | 2013 TM_{101} | — | February 10, 2011 | Mount Lemmon | Mount Lemmon Survey | · | 1.0 km | MPC · JPL |
| 622413 | 2013 TS_{103} | — | October 3, 2013 | Kitt Peak | Spacewatch | · | 1.7 km | MPC · JPL |
| 622414 | 2013 TS_{105} | — | March 30, 2012 | Mount Lemmon | Mount Lemmon Survey | MAS | 510 m | MPC · JPL |
| 622415 | 2013 TD_{113} | — | October 3, 2013 | Haleakala | Pan-STARRS 1 | · | 980 m | MPC · JPL |
| 622416 | 2013 TN_{120} | — | September 26, 2006 | Catalina | CSS | · | 530 m | MPC · JPL |
| 622417 | 2013 TD_{121} | — | October 16, 2006 | Kitt Peak | Spacewatch | NYS | 620 m | MPC · JPL |
| 622418 | 2013 TT_{129} | — | June 19, 2006 | Mount Lemmon | Mount Lemmon Survey | · | 620 m | MPC · JPL |
| 622419 | 2013 TP_{130} | — | September 20, 2006 | Palomar | NEAT | · | 620 m | MPC · JPL |
| 622420 | 2013 TE_{131} | — | September 14, 2013 | Mount Lemmon | Mount Lemmon Survey | · | 2.4 km | MPC · JPL |
| 622421 | 2013 TH_{137} | — | August 14, 2012 | Haleakala | Pan-STARRS 1 | L5 | 7.0 km | MPC · JPL |
| 622422 | 2013 TA_{138} | — | October 2, 2006 | Mount Lemmon | Mount Lemmon Survey | · | 640 m | MPC · JPL |
| 622423 | 2013 TJ_{145} | — | June 23, 2006 | Palomar | NEAT | · | 870 m | MPC · JPL |
| 622424 | 2013 TD_{150} | — | September 4, 2013 | Calar Alto | F. Hormuth | L5 | 6.4 km | MPC · JPL |
| 622425 | 2013 TR_{162} | — | September 18, 2007 | Bergisch Gladbach | W. Bickel | · | 2.2 km | MPC · JPL |
| 622426 | 2013 TU_{162} | — | September 11, 2007 | Mount Lemmon | Mount Lemmon Survey | THM | 1.9 km | MPC · JPL |
| 622427 | 2013 TU_{186} | — | October 3, 2013 | Haleakala | Pan-STARRS 1 | · | 570 m | MPC · JPL |
| 622428 | 2013 TW_{188} | — | October 3, 2013 | Haleakala | Pan-STARRS 1 | · | 770 m | MPC · JPL |
| 622429 | 2013 TM_{190} | — | January 18, 2015 | Mount Lemmon | Mount Lemmon Survey | · | 2.7 km | MPC · JPL |
| 622430 | 2013 TS_{195} | — | October 3, 2013 | Mount Lemmon | Mount Lemmon Survey | THM | 1.7 km | MPC · JPL |
| 622431 | 2013 TM_{201} | — | October 12, 2013 | Mount Lemmon | Mount Lemmon Survey | NYS | 710 m | MPC · JPL |
| 622432 | 2013 TA_{205} | — | October 3, 2013 | Haleakala | Pan-STARRS 1 | V | 450 m | MPC · JPL |
| 622433 | 2013 TY_{212} | — | October 2, 2013 | Mount Lemmon | Mount Lemmon Survey | · | 530 m | MPC · JPL |
| 622434 | 2013 UC_{7} | — | October 25, 2013 | Fort Davis | Lister, T. | H | 380 m | MPC · JPL |
| 622435 | 2013 UE_{13} | — | October 5, 2013 | Kitt Peak | Spacewatch | · | 580 m | MPC · JPL |
| 622436 | 2013 UB_{14} | — | October 4, 2013 | Mount Lemmon | Mount Lemmon Survey | EOS | 1.7 km | MPC · JPL |
| 622437 | 2013 UY_{23} | — | October 24, 2013 | Mount Lemmon | Mount Lemmon Survey | V | 470 m | MPC · JPL |
| 622438 | 2013 UJ_{28} | — | October 24, 2013 | Mount Lemmon | Mount Lemmon Survey | · | 970 m | MPC · JPL |
| 622439 | 2013 UM_{42} | — | October 28, 2013 | Mount Lemmon | Mount Lemmon Survey | · | 1.9 km | MPC · JPL |
| 622440 | 2013 VU_{21} | — | September 26, 2006 | Kitt Peak | Spacewatch | · | 470 m | MPC · JPL |
| 622441 | 2013 VJ_{44} | — | September 13, 2007 | Mount Lemmon | Mount Lemmon Survey | THM | 1.7 km | MPC · JPL |
| 622442 | 2013 VT_{50} | — | August 15, 2009 | Kitt Peak | Spacewatch | MAS | 620 m | MPC · JPL |
| 622443 | 2013 VK_{51} | — | November 4, 2013 | Haleakala | Pan-STARRS 1 | EMA | 2.4 km | MPC · JPL |
| 622444 | 2013 VE_{55} | — | November 9, 2013 | Haleakala | Pan-STARRS 1 | MAS | 540 m | MPC · JPL |
| 622445 | 2013 VQ_{58} | — | May 12, 2012 | Mount Lemmon | Mount Lemmon Survey | · | 940 m | MPC · JPL |
| 622446 | 2013 VW_{69} | — | November 4, 2013 | Mount Lemmon | Mount Lemmon Survey | PHO | 650 m | MPC · JPL |
| 622447 | 2013 WB_{15} | — | November 17, 2009 | Mount Lemmon | Mount Lemmon Survey | · | 910 m | MPC · JPL |
| 622448 | 2013 WQ_{20} | — | May 18, 2012 | Haleakala | Pan-STARRS 1 | · | 810 m | MPC · JPL |
| 622449 | 2013 WX_{30} | — | November 9, 2013 | Haleakala | Pan-STARRS 1 | · | 950 m | MPC · JPL |
| 622450 | 2013 WU_{32} | — | November 2, 2013 | Kitt Peak | Spacewatch | · | 690 m | MPC · JPL |
| 622451 | 2013 WM_{56} | — | November 25, 2006 | Mount Lemmon | Mount Lemmon Survey | NYS | 720 m | MPC · JPL |
| 622452 | 2013 WQ_{64} | — | November 16, 2006 | Mount Lemmon | Mount Lemmon Survey | PHO | 880 m | MPC · JPL |
| 622453 | 2013 WU_{66} | — | November 6, 2013 | Haleakala | Pan-STARRS 1 | · | 3.1 km | MPC · JPL |
| 622454 | 2013 WA_{68} | — | October 19, 2006 | Catalina | CSS | · | 600 m | MPC · JPL |
| 622455 | 2013 WV_{70} | — | September 14, 1998 | Kitt Peak | Spacewatch | MAS | 460 m | MPC · JPL |
| 622456 | 2013 WU_{97} | — | October 9, 2013 | Mount Lemmon | Mount Lemmon Survey | · | 710 m | MPC · JPL |
| 622457 | 2013 WZ_{103} | — | November 29, 2013 | XuYi | PMO NEO Survey Program | · | 770 m | MPC · JPL |
| 622458 | 2013 WQ_{120} | — | April 27, 2017 | Haleakala | Pan-STARRS 1 | HYG | 2.0 km | MPC · JPL |
| 622459 | 2013 WA_{121} | — | November 28, 2013 | Mount Lemmon | Mount Lemmon Survey | · | 2.1 km | MPC · JPL |
| 622460 | 2013 WF_{130} | — | August 15, 2009 | Kitt Peak | Spacewatch | MAS | 570 m | MPC · JPL |
| 622461 | 2013 XK_{3} | — | December 4, 2013 | Haleakala | Pan-STARRS 1 | · | 3.0 km | MPC · JPL |
| 622462 | 2013 XV_{7} | — | October 22, 2006 | Mount Lemmon | Mount Lemmon Survey | NYS | 970 m | MPC · JPL |
| 622463 | 2013 XD_{14} | — | May 7, 2008 | Kitt Peak | Spacewatch | · | 1.1 km | MPC · JPL |
| 622464 | 2013 XO_{14} | — | July 8, 1997 | Flagstaff | B. A. Skiff | · | 1.6 km | MPC · JPL |
| 622465 | 2013 XY_{41} | — | December 11, 2013 | Haleakala | Pan-STARRS 1 | · | 800 m | MPC · JPL |
| 622466 | 2013 YR_{18} | — | November 22, 2006 | Mount Lemmon | Mount Lemmon Survey | · | 850 m | MPC · JPL |
| 622467 Ignés | 2013 YX_{22} | Ignés | July 20, 2012 | SM Montmagastrell | Bosch, J. M., Olivera, R. M. | · | 2.3 km | MPC · JPL |
| 622468 | 2013 YM_{37} | — | September 27, 2002 | Palomar | NEAT | · | 1.9 km | MPC · JPL |
| 622469 | 2013 YZ_{53} | — | November 28, 2013 | Mount Lemmon | Mount Lemmon Survey | · | 3.2 km | MPC · JPL |
| 622470 | 2013 YQ_{65} | — | January 25, 2007 | Kitt Peak | Spacewatch | · | 890 m | MPC · JPL |
| 622471 | 2013 YU_{109} | — | May 24, 2006 | Mount Lemmon | Mount Lemmon Survey | EUP | 3.8 km | MPC · JPL |
| 622472 | 2013 YM_{148} | — | December 31, 2013 | Haleakala | Pan-STARRS 1 | · | 970 m | MPC · JPL |
| 622473 | 2013 YW_{163} | — | December 25, 2013 | Haleakala | Pan-STARRS 1 | PHO | 730 m | MPC · JPL |
| 622474 | 2014 AH_{1} | — | January 1, 2014 | Haleakala | Pan-STARRS 1 | · | 860 m | MPC · JPL |
| 622475 | 2014 AP_{13} | — | November 10, 2013 | Catalina | CSS | T_{j} (2.96) | 2.9 km | MPC · JPL |
| 622476 | 2014 AP_{24} | — | December 11, 2013 | Mount Lemmon | Mount Lemmon Survey | · | 2.7 km | MPC · JPL |
| 622477 | 2014 AB_{49} | — | September 17, 2012 | Catalina | CSS | EUP | 3.3 km | MPC · JPL |
| 622478 | 2014 AT_{58} | — | January 1, 2014 | Kitt Peak | Spacewatch | HNS | 790 m | MPC · JPL |
| 622479 | 2014 AY_{61} | — | January 10, 2014 | Kitt Peak | Spacewatch | HNS | 760 m | MPC · JPL |
| 622480 | 2014 BO_{8} | — | December 30, 2013 | Catalina | CSS | H | 530 m | MPC · JPL |
| 622481 | 2014 BK_{14} | — | October 10, 2012 | Mount Lemmon | Mount Lemmon Survey | · | 1.2 km | MPC · JPL |
| 622482 | 2014 BD_{21} | — | August 24, 2005 | Palomar | NEAT | · | 1.2 km | MPC · JPL |
| 622483 | 2014 BC_{23} | — | January 1, 2014 | Mount Lemmon | Mount Lemmon Survey | · | 1.1 km | MPC · JPL |
| 622484 | 2014 BY_{32} | — | January 25, 2014 | Haleakala | Pan-STARRS 1 | AMO | 450 m | MPC · JPL |
| 622485 | 2014 BD_{52} | — | January 1, 2014 | Haleakala | Pan-STARRS 1 | · | 1.1 km | MPC · JPL |
| 622486 | 2014 BY_{52} | — | February 4, 2006 | Kitt Peak | Spacewatch | · | 990 m | MPC · JPL |
| 622487 | 2014 BP_{68} | — | January 10, 2014 | Mount Lemmon | Mount Lemmon Survey | EUN | 1.0 km | MPC · JPL |
| 622488 | 2014 BJ_{74} | — | January 24, 2014 | Haleakala | Pan-STARRS 1 | · | 930 m | MPC · JPL |
| 622489 | 2014 BK_{79} | — | September 16, 2012 | Mount Lemmon | Mount Lemmon Survey | · | 1.2 km | MPC · JPL |
| 622490 | 2014 CH_{11} | — | February 6, 2014 | Mount Lemmon | Mount Lemmon Survey | · | 970 m | MPC · JPL |
| 622491 | 2014 CO_{35} | — | February 10, 2014 | Mount Lemmon | Mount Lemmon Survey | · | 1.8 km | MPC · JPL |
| 622492 | 2014 DT_{46} | — | August 17, 2012 | Les Engarouines | L. Bernasconi | H | 630 m | MPC · JPL |
| 622493 | 2014 DG_{47} | — | February 27, 2014 | Kitt Peak | Spacewatch | · | 1.2 km | MPC · JPL |
| 622494 | 2014 DP_{60} | — | February 26, 2014 | Haleakala | Pan-STARRS 1 | · | 1.3 km | MPC · JPL |
| 622495 | 2014 DJ_{106} | — | February 27, 2014 | Mount Lemmon | Mount Lemmon Survey | · | 1.2 km | MPC · JPL |
| 622496 | 2014 DB_{108} | — | February 27, 2014 | Mount Lemmon | Mount Lemmon Survey | · | 1.1 km | MPC · JPL |
| 622497 | 2014 DJ_{132} | — | October 21, 2012 | Mount Lemmon | Mount Lemmon Survey | EUN | 810 m | MPC · JPL |
| 622498 | 2014 DD_{133} | — | February 28, 2014 | Haleakala | Pan-STARRS 1 | (194) | 1.2 km | MPC · JPL |
| 622499 | 2014 DU_{148} | — | December 3, 2008 | Mount Lemmon | Mount Lemmon Survey | JUN | 850 m | MPC · JPL |
| 622500 | 2014 DO_{158} | — | February 21, 2014 | Haleakala | Pan-STARRS 1 | · | 1.2 km | MPC · JPL |

== 622501–622600 ==
back to top

| Designation | | | Discovery | | | Properties | | Ref |
| Permanent | Provisional | Named after | Date | Site | Discoverer(s) | Category | Diam. | Ref |
|---|---|---|---|---|---|---|---|---|
| 622501 | 2014 DT_{158} | — | February 26, 2014 | Mount Lemmon | Mount Lemmon Survey | (194) | 1.3 km | MPC · JPL |
| 622502 | 2014 DX_{163} | — | February 26, 2014 | Haleakala | Pan-STARRS 1 | · | 890 m | MPC · JPL |
| 622503 | 2014 EA | — | March 10, 2004 | Palomar | NEAT | PHO | 2.4 km | MPC · JPL |
| 622504 | 2014 ET_{25} | — | February 6, 2005 | Palomar | NEAT | · | 1.7 km | MPC · JPL |
| 622505 | 2014 EW_{52} | — | March 1, 2014 | Cerro Tololo | DECam | · | 1.2 km | MPC · JPL |
| 622506 | 2014 EV_{64} | — | October 22, 2012 | Haleakala | Pan-STARRS 1 | · | 1.2 km | MPC · JPL |
| 622507 | 2014 EG_{67} | — | September 5, 2015 | Haleakala | Pan-STARRS 1 | · | 740 m | MPC · JPL |
| 622508 | 2014 ED_{85} | — | September 6, 2015 | Haleakala | Pan-STARRS 1 | · | 780 m | MPC · JPL |
| 622509 | 2014 EC_{91} | — | September 22, 2011 | Kitt Peak | Spacewatch | · | 840 m | MPC · JPL |
| 622510 | 2014 EV_{95} | — | August 4, 2003 | Kitt Peak | Spacewatch | (5) | 980 m | MPC · JPL |
| 622511 | 2014 EX_{125} | — | June 18, 2015 | Haleakala | Pan-STARRS 1 | · | 1.2 km | MPC · JPL |
| 622512 | 2014 EK_{140} | — | December 3, 2012 | Mount Lemmon | Mount Lemmon Survey | · | 1.0 km | MPC · JPL |
| 622513 | 2014 EH_{152} | — | October 12, 2016 | Haleakala | Pan-STARRS 1 | · | 790 m | MPC · JPL |
| 622514 | 2014 EG_{207} | — | May 18, 2015 | Mount Lemmon | Mount Lemmon Survey | · | 900 m | MPC · JPL |
| 622515 | 2014 EC_{218} | — | September 16, 2003 | Palomar | NEAT | BRG | 1.2 km | MPC · JPL |
| 622516 | 2014 FT_{27} | — | February 9, 2014 | Mount Lemmon | Mount Lemmon Survey | JUN | 1.1 km | MPC · JPL |
| 622517 | 2014 FZ_{81} | — | March 27, 2014 | Haleakala | Pan-STARRS 1 | 3:2 · SHU | 5.0 km | MPC · JPL |
| 622518 | 2014 FM_{85} | — | March 20, 2014 | Mount Lemmon | Mount Lemmon Survey | · | 1.1 km | MPC · JPL |
| 622519 | 2014 GL | — | April 20, 2010 | Mount Lemmon | Mount Lemmon Survey | · | 1.2 km | MPC · JPL |
| 622520 | 2014 GS | — | November 7, 2012 | Haleakala | Pan-STARRS 1 | · | 1.2 km | MPC · JPL |
| 622521 | 2014 GF_{15} | — | March 8, 2014 | Kitt Peak | Spacewatch | · | 1.3 km | MPC · JPL |
| 622522 | 2014 GG_{21} | — | November 7, 2007 | Kitt Peak | Spacewatch | · | 1.3 km | MPC · JPL |
| 622523 | 2014 GO_{23} | — | January 20, 2009 | Mount Lemmon | Mount Lemmon Survey | · | 1.8 km | MPC · JPL |
| 622524 | 2014 GC_{26} | — | September 28, 2011 | Mount Lemmon | Mount Lemmon Survey | · | 1.4 km | MPC · JPL |
| 622525 | 2014 GQ_{36} | — | March 9, 2005 | Mount Lemmon | Mount Lemmon Survey | · | 1.4 km | MPC · JPL |
| 622526 | 2014 GR_{48} | — | April 8, 2014 | Elena Remote | Oreshko, A. | · | 1.8 km | MPC · JPL |
| 622527 | 2014 GM_{75} | — | April 8, 2014 | Mount Lemmon | Mount Lemmon Survey | · | 1.2 km | MPC · JPL |
| 622528 | 2014 GU_{89} | — | April 4, 2014 | Haleakala | Pan-STARRS 1 | · | 1.2 km | MPC · JPL |
| 622529 | 2014 GA_{90} | — | April 5, 2014 | Haleakala | Pan-STARRS 1 | · | 1.5 km | MPC · JPL |
| 622530 | 2014 HR_{1} | — | April 8, 2014 | Haleakala | Pan-STARRS 1 | · | 1.4 km | MPC · JPL |
| 622531 | 2014 HW_{22} | — | February 28, 2014 | Haleakala | Pan-STARRS 1 | EUN | 1.1 km | MPC · JPL |
| 622532 | 2014 HS_{26} | — | November 3, 2007 | Kitt Peak | Spacewatch | (5) | 1.1 km | MPC · JPL |
| 622533 | 2014 HB_{32} | — | October 20, 2011 | Kitt Peak | Spacewatch | · | 930 m | MPC · JPL |
| 622534 | 2014 HY_{32} | — | April 4, 2014 | Haleakala | Pan-STARRS 1 | · | 1.5 km | MPC · JPL |
| 622535 | 2014 HE_{36} | — | April 24, 2014 | Mount Lemmon | Mount Lemmon Survey | · | 1.1 km | MPC · JPL |
| 622536 | 2014 HK_{37} | — | April 24, 2014 | Mount Lemmon | Mount Lemmon Survey | · | 1.4 km | MPC · JPL |
| 622537 | 2014 HR_{38} | — | August 28, 2006 | Catalina | CSS | · | 1.1 km | MPC · JPL |
| 622538 | 2014 HP_{40} | — | March 19, 2009 | Mount Lemmon | Mount Lemmon Survey | · | 1.4 km | MPC · JPL |
| 622539 | 2014 HZ_{143} | — | March 13, 2014 | Kitt Peak | Spacewatch | · | 1.0 km | MPC · JPL |
| 622540 | 2014 HB_{173} | — | August 13, 2006 | Palomar | NEAT | · | 1.4 km | MPC · JPL |
| 622541 | 2014 HG_{173} | — | October 28, 2011 | Mount Lemmon | Mount Lemmon Survey | · | 1.4 km | MPC · JPL |
| 622542 | 2014 HH_{173} | — | April 29, 2014 | Haleakala | Pan-STARRS 1 | PAD | 1.1 km | MPC · JPL |
| 622543 | 2014 HR_{175} | — | March 5, 2013 | Haleakala | Pan-STARRS 1 | 3:2 | 4.2 km | MPC · JPL |
| 622544 | 2014 HD_{200} | — | April 29, 2014 | Haleakala | Pan-STARRS 1 | plutino | 200 km | MPC · JPL |
| 622545 | 2014 HX_{207} | — | April 30, 2014 | Haleakala | Pan-STARRS 1 | HOF | 1.8 km | MPC · JPL |
| 622546 | 2014 HX_{211} | — | April 23, 2014 | Cerro Tololo | DECam | CLO | 1.6 km | MPC · JPL |
| 622547 | 2014 HQ_{213} | — | April 30, 2014 | Haleakala | Pan-STARRS 1 | · | 1.2 km | MPC · JPL |
| 622548 | 2014 JG_{1} | — | January 16, 2013 | Mount Lemmon | Mount Lemmon Survey | · | 1.4 km | MPC · JPL |
| 622549 | 2014 JN_{17} | — | April 14, 2007 | Kitt Peak | Spacewatch | · | 730 m | MPC · JPL |
| 622550 | 2014 JD_{18} | — | September 28, 2003 | Kitt Peak | Spacewatch | · | 1.4 km | MPC · JPL |
| 622551 | 2014 JS_{21} | — | March 28, 2014 | Haleakala | Pan-STARRS 1 | · | 1.7 km | MPC · JPL |
| 622552 | 2014 JB_{33} | — | March 25, 2014 | Kitt Peak | Spacewatch | · | 1.4 km | MPC · JPL |
| 622553 | 2014 JO_{41} | — | February 14, 2005 | La Silla | A. Boattini | · | 1.7 km | MPC · JPL |
| 622554 | 2014 JE_{43} | — | October 18, 2011 | Kitt Peak | Spacewatch | · | 2.3 km | MPC · JPL |
| 622555 | 2014 JT_{49} | — | May 25, 2010 | Mount Lemmon | Mount Lemmon Survey | · | 1.6 km | MPC · JPL |
| 622556 | 2014 JK_{54} | — | May 8, 2014 | Haleakala | Pan-STARRS 1 | · | 550 m | MPC · JPL |
| 622557 | 2014 JV_{64} | — | April 30, 2014 | Haleakala | Pan-STARRS 1 | EUN | 780 m | MPC · JPL |
| 622558 | 2014 JE_{88} | — | May 4, 2014 | Haleakala | Pan-STARRS 1 | EUN | 950 m | MPC · JPL |
| 622559 | 2014 JZ_{88} | — | May 5, 2014 | Mount Lemmon | Mount Lemmon Survey | ADE | 1.6 km | MPC · JPL |
| 622560 | 2014 JH_{91} | — | May 10, 2014 | Mount Lemmon | Mount Lemmon Survey | · | 1.5 km | MPC · JPL |
| 622561 | 2014 JF_{97} | — | May 5, 2014 | Haleakala | Pan-STARRS 1 | · | 1.4 km | MPC · JPL |
| 622562 | 2014 KX_{17} | — | May 7, 2014 | Haleakala | Pan-STARRS 1 | EUN | 830 m | MPC · JPL |
| 622563 | 2014 KR_{25} | — | April 3, 2014 | Haleakala | Pan-STARRS 1 | · | 1.3 km | MPC · JPL |
| 622564 | 2014 KP_{28} | — | May 7, 2014 | Haleakala | Pan-STARRS 1 | · | 1.5 km | MPC · JPL |
| 622565 | 2014 KV_{36} | — | February 3, 2009 | Mount Lemmon | Mount Lemmon Survey | · | 1.4 km | MPC · JPL |
| 622566 | 2014 KM_{52} | — | January 4, 2013 | Cerro Tololo-DECam | DECam | · | 1.4 km | MPC · JPL |
| 622567 | 2014 KJ_{82} | — | May 3, 2014 | Haleakala | Pan-STARRS 1 | · | 1.5 km | MPC · JPL |
| 622568 | 2014 KT_{88} | — | September 13, 2007 | Mount Lemmon | Mount Lemmon Survey | · | 2.1 km | MPC · JPL |
| 622569 | 2014 KH_{106} | — | May 21, 2014 | Haleakala | Pan-STARRS 1 | DOR | 1.8 km | MPC · JPL |
| 622570 | 2014 KU_{111} | — | May 27, 2014 | Mount Lemmon | Mount Lemmon Survey | · | 1.2 km | MPC · JPL |
| 622571 | 2014 KR_{112} | — | May 31, 2014 | Haleakala | Pan-STARRS 1 | · | 1.3 km | MPC · JPL |
| 622572 | 2014 KU_{112} | — | May 23, 2014 | Haleakala | Pan-STARRS 1 | ADE | 1.4 km | MPC · JPL |
| 622573 | 2014 KC_{113} | — | May 28, 2014 | Mount Lemmon | Mount Lemmon Survey | · | 1.4 km | MPC · JPL |
| 622574 | 2014 KY_{134} | — | May 28, 2014 | Mount Lemmon | Mount Lemmon Survey | PAD | 1.2 km | MPC · JPL |
| 622575 | 2014 KZ_{134} | — | May 25, 2014 | Haleakala | Pan-STARRS 1 | DOR | 1.6 km | MPC · JPL |
| 622576 | 2014 LX_{1} | — | May 23, 2001 | Cerro Tololo | Deep Ecliptic Survey | · | 1.3 km | MPC · JPL |
| 622577 Mioriţa | 2014 LU_{14} | Mioriţa | June 2, 2014 | La Palma | EURONEAR | APO | 410 m | MPC · JPL |
| 622578 | 2014 LT_{19} | — | October 30, 2011 | Mount Lemmon | Mount Lemmon Survey | · | 1.7 km | MPC · JPL |
| 622579 | 2014 LR_{20} | — | October 11, 2010 | Mayhill-ISON | L. Elenin | · | 1.3 km | MPC · JPL |
| 622580 | 2014 LK_{29} | — | June 4, 2014 | Haleakala | Pan-STARRS 1 | · | 1.8 km | MPC · JPL |
| 622581 | 2014 LY_{30} | — | June 2, 2014 | Haleakala | Pan-STARRS 1 | · | 1.8 km | MPC · JPL |
| 622582 | 2014 MW_{9} | — | June 5, 2014 | Haleakala | Pan-STARRS 1 | MAR | 880 m | MPC · JPL |
| 622583 | 2014 MS_{11} | — | May 7, 2014 | Haleakala | Pan-STARRS 1 | · | 1.1 km | MPC · JPL |
| 622584 | 2014 ML_{24} | — | July 2, 2005 | Kitt Peak | Spacewatch | AEO | 820 m | MPC · JPL |
| 622585 | 2014 MJ_{29} | — | May 21, 2014 | Haleakala | Pan-STARRS 1 | · | 1.2 km | MPC · JPL |
| 622586 | 2014 ME_{31} | — | August 13, 2010 | Kitt Peak | Spacewatch | · | 1.8 km | MPC · JPL |
| 622587 | 2014 MC_{39} | — | May 26, 2014 | Haleakala | Pan-STARRS 1 | TIN | 650 m | MPC · JPL |
| 622588 | 2014 MD_{43} | — | October 31, 2010 | Mount Lemmon | Mount Lemmon Survey | DOR | 1.7 km | MPC · JPL |
| 622589 | 2014 MV_{45} | — | February 9, 2008 | Kitt Peak | Spacewatch | · | 1.4 km | MPC · JPL |
| 622590 | 2014 MX_{50} | — | November 3, 2010 | Mount Lemmon | Mount Lemmon Survey | · | 1.2 km | MPC · JPL |
| 622591 | 2014 MM_{55} | — | June 24, 2014 | Haleakala | Pan-STARRS 1 | AMO | 610 m | MPC · JPL |
| 622592 | 2014 MH_{58} | — | June 27, 2014 | Haleakala | Pan-STARRS 1 | · | 2.1 km | MPC · JPL |
| 622593 | 2014 MN_{60} | — | September 29, 2005 | Catalina | CSS | · | 1.4 km | MPC · JPL |
| 622594 | 2014 MY_{73} | — | June 4, 2014 | Haleakala | Pan-STARRS 1 | · | 1.6 km | MPC · JPL |
| 622595 | 2014 MT_{80} | — | June 23, 2014 | Mount Lemmon | Mount Lemmon Survey | · | 1.9 km | MPC · JPL |
| 622596 | 2014 NW_{5} | — | September 11, 2010 | Mount Lemmon | Mount Lemmon Survey | · | 1.3 km | MPC · JPL |
| 622597 | 2014 NX_{5} | — | July 1, 2014 | Haleakala | Pan-STARRS 1 | KOR | 990 m | MPC · JPL |
| 622598 | 2014 NW_{16} | — | May 5, 2014 | Haleakala | Pan-STARRS 1 | · | 1.3 km | MPC · JPL |
| 622599 | 2014 NP_{22} | — | June 4, 2014 | Haleakala | Pan-STARRS 1 | · | 1.7 km | MPC · JPL |
| 622600 | 2014 NS_{26} | — | September 11, 2001 | Kitt Peak | Spacewatch | · | 1.2 km | MPC · JPL |

== 622601–622700 ==
back to top

| Designation | | | Discovery | | | Properties | | Ref |
| Permanent | Provisional | Named after | Date | Site | Discoverer(s) | Category | Diam. | Ref |
|---|---|---|---|---|---|---|---|---|
| 622601 | 2014 NN_{44} | — | June 30, 2014 | Mount Lemmon | Mount Lemmon Survey | · | 2.4 km | MPC · JPL |
| 622602 | 2014 NZ_{52} | — | July 2, 2014 | Haleakala | Pan-STARRS 1 | · | 1.1 km | MPC · JPL |
| 622603 | 2014 ND_{56} | — | August 31, 2005 | Palomar | NEAT | · | 1.8 km | MPC · JPL |
| 622604 | 2014 NO_{58} | — | October 23, 2008 | Kitt Peak | Spacewatch | · | 540 m | MPC · JPL |
| 622605 | 2014 NQ_{68} | — | July 7, 2014 | Haleakala | Pan-STARRS 1 | · | 2.0 km | MPC · JPL |
| 622606 | 2014 NX_{68} | — | October 29, 2010 | Kitt Peak | Spacewatch | · | 1.4 km | MPC · JPL |
| 622607 | 2014 ND_{69} | — | March 30, 2008 | Kitt Peak | Spacewatch | · | 1.3 km | MPC · JPL |
| 622608 | 2014 OL | — | June 5, 2014 | Haleakala | Pan-STARRS 1 | · | 1.5 km | MPC · JPL |
| 622609 | 2014 OU_{19} | — | October 25, 1995 | Kitt Peak | Spacewatch | · | 1.7 km | MPC · JPL |
| 622610 | 2014 OQ_{41} | — | July 25, 2014 | Haleakala | Pan-STARRS 1 | · | 1.7 km | MPC · JPL |
| 622611 | 2014 OJ_{47} | — | July 3, 2014 | Haleakala | Pan-STARRS 1 | · | 1.3 km | MPC · JPL |
| 622612 | 2014 OA_{55} | — | August 19, 2010 | Kitt Peak | Spacewatch | · | 1.3 km | MPC · JPL |
| 622613 | 2014 OB_{81} | — | June 20, 2014 | Haleakala | Pan-STARRS 1 | · | 1.7 km | MPC · JPL |
| 622614 | 2014 OS_{83} | — | July 26, 2014 | Haleakala | Pan-STARRS 1 | · | 1.3 km | MPC · JPL |
| 622615 | 2014 OS_{95} | — | September 23, 2005 | Kitt Peak | Spacewatch | · | 1.5 km | MPC · JPL |
| 622616 | 2014 OG_{110} | — | January 4, 2012 | Kitt Peak | Spacewatch | · | 1.8 km | MPC · JPL |
| 622617 | 2014 OA_{118} | — | April 10, 2013 | Haleakala | Pan-STARRS 1 | · | 1.4 km | MPC · JPL |
| 622618 | 2014 OD_{134} | — | October 1, 2005 | Mount Lemmon | Mount Lemmon Survey | KOR | 980 m | MPC · JPL |
| 622619 | 2014 OE_{153} | — | September 29, 2010 | Mount Lemmon | Mount Lemmon Survey | · | 1.3 km | MPC · JPL |
| 622620 | 2014 OF_{160} | — | January 19, 2012 | Haleakala | Pan-STARRS 1 | · | 1.6 km | MPC · JPL |
| 622621 | 2014 OR_{195} | — | July 27, 2014 | Haleakala | Pan-STARRS 1 | · | 1.4 km | MPC · JPL |
| 622622 | 2014 OF_{196} | — | September 22, 2009 | Mount Lemmon | Mount Lemmon Survey | · | 1.6 km | MPC · JPL |
| 622623 | 2014 OU_{205} | — | July 25, 2014 | Haleakala | Pan-STARRS 1 | · | 1.5 km | MPC · JPL |
| 622624 | 2014 OR_{215} | — | July 27, 2014 | Haleakala | Pan-STARRS 1 | · | 1.8 km | MPC · JPL |
| 622625 | 2014 OO_{216} | — | July 27, 2014 | Haleakala | Pan-STARRS 1 | · | 1.3 km | MPC · JPL |
| 622626 | 2014 OD_{224} | — | December 18, 2007 | Mount Lemmon | Mount Lemmon Survey | HNS | 930 m | MPC · JPL |
| 622627 | 2014 OL_{236} | — | June 4, 2005 | Kitt Peak | Spacewatch | · | 1.7 km | MPC · JPL |
| 622628 | 2014 OG_{237} | — | March 19, 2013 | Haleakala | Pan-STARRS 1 | · | 1.3 km | MPC · JPL |
| 622629 | 2014 OU_{242} | — | September 11, 2010 | Kitt Peak | Spacewatch | · | 1.2 km | MPC · JPL |
| 622630 | 2014 OO_{244} | — | April 1, 2008 | Kitt Peak | Spacewatch | · | 2.0 km | MPC · JPL |
| 622631 | 2014 OQ_{252} | — | December 6, 2011 | Haleakala | Pan-STARRS 1 | · | 760 m | MPC · JPL |
| 622632 | 2014 OU_{261} | — | December 8, 2005 | Kitt Peak | Spacewatch | EOS | 1.2 km | MPC · JPL |
| 622633 | 2014 OU_{265} | — | June 27, 2014 | Haleakala | Pan-STARRS 1 | DOR | 1.9 km | MPC · JPL |
| 622634 | 2014 OL_{270} | — | September 17, 2010 | Mount Lemmon | Mount Lemmon Survey | · | 1.3 km | MPC · JPL |
| 622635 | 2014 OE_{276} | — | November 12, 2010 | Mount Lemmon | Mount Lemmon Survey | · | 1.5 km | MPC · JPL |
| 622636 | 2014 OB_{294} | — | November 12, 2010 | Mount Lemmon | Mount Lemmon Survey | GEF | 1.1 km | MPC · JPL |
| 622637 | 2014 OO_{294} | — | October 22, 2005 | Catalina | CSS | · | 1.6 km | MPC · JPL |
| 622638 | 2014 OV_{296} | — | October 26, 2009 | Kitt Peak | Spacewatch | · | 2.2 km | MPC · JPL |
| 622639 | 2014 OP_{298} | — | August 27, 2009 | Catalina | CSS | · | 1.8 km | MPC · JPL |
| 622640 | 2014 OB_{303} | — | July 25, 2014 | Haleakala | Pan-STARRS 1 | KOR | 950 m | MPC · JPL |
| 622641 | 2014 OC_{336} | — | April 16, 2013 | Cerro Tololo-DECam | DECam | · | 2.6 km | MPC · JPL |
| 622642 | 2014 OG_{343} | — | November 16, 2010 | Mount Lemmon | Mount Lemmon Survey | · | 1.5 km | MPC · JPL |
| 622643 | 2014 OQ_{368} | — | July 7, 2014 | Haleakala | Pan-STARRS 1 | · | 1.2 km | MPC · JPL |
| 622644 | 2014 OL_{383} | — | July 27, 2014 | Haleakala | Pan-STARRS 1 | · | 2.4 km | MPC · JPL |
| 622645 | 2014 OA_{389} | — | July 11, 2005 | Kitt Peak | Spacewatch | · | 1.4 km | MPC · JPL |
| 622646 | 2014 OQ_{399} | — | November 1, 2005 | Mount Lemmon | Mount Lemmon Survey | · | 1.6 km | MPC · JPL |
| 622647 | 2014 OM_{411} | — | July 28, 2014 | Haleakala | Pan-STARRS 1 | · | 1.4 km | MPC · JPL |
| 622648 | 2014 OL_{432} | — | July 31, 2014 | Haleakala | Pan-STARRS 1 | EOS | 1.4 km | MPC · JPL |
| 622649 | 2014 OB_{433} | — | July 30, 2014 | Haleakala | Pan-STARRS 1 | · | 1.5 km | MPC · JPL |
| 622650 | 2014 OA_{453} | — | July 31, 2014 | Haleakala | Pan-STARRS 1 | · | 2.2 km | MPC · JPL |
| 622651 | 2014 OR_{464} | — | July 27, 2014 | Haleakala | Pan-STARRS 1 | KOR | 1.0 km | MPC · JPL |
| 622652 | 2014 PA_{3} | — | August 4, 2014 | Haleakala | Pan-STARRS 1 | · | 1.5 km | MPC · JPL |
| 622653 | 2014 PP_{4} | — | October 11, 2010 | Mayhill-ISON | L. Elenin | · | 1.5 km | MPC · JPL |
| 622654 | 2014 PW_{13} | — | September 23, 2011 | Haleakala | Pan-STARRS 1 | · | 480 m | MPC · JPL |
| 622655 | 2014 PH_{21} | — | July 26, 2014 | ESA OGS | ESA OGS | EOS | 1.3 km | MPC · JPL |
| 622656 | 2014 PO_{47} | — | August 28, 2005 | Anderson Mesa | LONEOS | · | 1.5 km | MPC · JPL |
| 622657 | 2014 PF_{57} | — | December 6, 2005 | Kitt Peak | Spacewatch | EOS | 2.0 km | MPC · JPL |
| 622658 | 2014 PQ_{60} | — | May 10, 2014 | Haleakala | Pan-STARRS 1 | EUN | 810 m | MPC · JPL |
| 622659 | 2014 PR_{61} | — | October 27, 2005 | Kitt Peak | Spacewatch | · | 1.1 km | MPC · JPL |
| 622660 | 2014 PY_{61} | — | August 30, 2005 | Kitt Peak | Spacewatch | (13314) | 1.7 km | MPC · JPL |
| 622661 | 2014 PP_{73} | — | October 16, 2009 | Mount Lemmon | Mount Lemmon Survey | · | 1.6 km | MPC · JPL |
| 622662 | 2014 PQ_{74} | — | August 3, 2014 | Haleakala | Pan-STARRS 1 | · | 2.0 km | MPC · JPL |
| 622663 | 2014 PG_{75} | — | August 3, 2014 | Haleakala | Pan-STARRS 1 | · | 1.4 km | MPC · JPL |
| 622664 | 2014 QJ | — | May 10, 2005 | Anderson Mesa | LONEOS | BAR | 1.2 km | MPC · JPL |
| 622665 | 2014 QZ_{7} | — | May 12, 2013 | Haleakala | Pan-STARRS 1 | · | 2.2 km | MPC · JPL |
| 622666 | 2014 QM_{11} | — | July 3, 2014 | Haleakala | Pan-STARRS 1 | · | 1.5 km | MPC · JPL |
| 622667 | 2014 QO_{21} | — | August 6, 2014 | Haleakala | Pan-STARRS 1 | · | 1.6 km | MPC · JPL |
| 622668 | 2014 QT_{27} | — | September 29, 2011 | Kitt Peak | Spacewatch | · | 460 m | MPC · JPL |
| 622669 | 2014 QL_{30} | — | November 3, 2005 | Mount Lemmon | Mount Lemmon Survey | · | 1.6 km | MPC · JPL |
| 622670 | 2014 QQ_{46} | — | September 10, 2010 | Kitt Peak | Spacewatch | · | 1.4 km | MPC · JPL |
| 622671 | 2014 QD_{52} | — | July 7, 2014 | Haleakala | Pan-STARRS 1 | · | 1.2 km | MPC · JPL |
| 622672 | 2014 QC_{69} | — | June 5, 2014 | Haleakala | Pan-STARRS 1 | · | 540 m | MPC · JPL |
| 622673 | 2014 QP_{73} | — | December 9, 2001 | Socorro | LINEAR | · | 1.7 km | MPC · JPL |
| 622674 | 2014 QK_{96} | — | August 20, 2014 | Haleakala | Pan-STARRS 1 | EOS | 1.2 km | MPC · JPL |
| 622675 | 2014 QV_{167} | — | October 1, 2003 | Anderson Mesa | LONEOS | · | 2.8 km | MPC · JPL |
| 622676 | 2014 QP_{168} | — | August 6, 2014 | Haleakala | Pan-STARRS 1 | · | 1.6 km | MPC · JPL |
| 622677 | 2014 QD_{186} | — | August 22, 2014 | Haleakala | Pan-STARRS 1 | WIT | 830 m | MPC · JPL |
| 622678 | 2014 QU_{187} | — | March 19, 2013 | Haleakala | Pan-STARRS 1 | · | 1.5 km | MPC · JPL |
| 622679 | 2014 QU_{206} | — | February 23, 2007 | Mount Lemmon | Mount Lemmon Survey | · | 1.5 km | MPC · JPL |
| 622680 | 2014 QM_{238} | — | January 28, 2011 | Mount Lemmon | Mount Lemmon Survey | · | 2.3 km | MPC · JPL |
| 622681 | 2014 QF_{247} | — | October 24, 2011 | Kitt Peak | Spacewatch | · | 520 m | MPC · JPL |
| 622682 | 2014 QX_{248} | — | October 14, 2001 | Kitt Peak | Spacewatch | · | 430 m | MPC · JPL |
| 622683 | 2014 QG_{253} | — | April 7, 2002 | Cerro Tololo | Deep Ecliptic Survey | · | 1.7 km | MPC · JPL |
| 622684 | 2014 QG_{258} | — | August 22, 2014 | Haleakala | Pan-STARRS 1 | EOS | 1.5 km | MPC · JPL |
| 622685 | 2014 QV_{263} | — | September 27, 2009 | Kitt Peak | Spacewatch | EOS | 1.3 km | MPC · JPL |
| 622686 | 2014 QH_{279} | — | October 11, 2010 | Kitt Peak | Spacewatch | · | 1.5 km | MPC · JPL |
| 622687 | 2014 QT_{287} | — | August 25, 2014 | Haleakala | Pan-STARRS 1 | · | 2.6 km | MPC · JPL |
| 622688 | 2014 QD_{289} | — | April 13, 2013 | Haleakala | Pan-STARRS 1 | · | 1.8 km | MPC · JPL |
| 622689 | 2014 QN_{293} | — | August 25, 2014 | Haleakala | Pan-STARRS 1 | · | 2.7 km | MPC · JPL |
| 622690 | 2014 QH_{297} | — | September 24, 2011 | Haleakala | Pan-STARRS 1 | · | 560 m | MPC · JPL |
| 622691 | 2014 QE_{309} | — | August 5, 2004 | Palomar | NEAT | · | 1.5 km | MPC · JPL |
| 622692 | 2014 QL_{321} | — | August 17, 2009 | Kitt Peak | Spacewatch | · | 1.2 km | MPC · JPL |
| 622693 | 2014 QO_{322} | — | April 10, 2010 | Mount Lemmon | Mount Lemmon Survey | · | 460 m | MPC · JPL |
| 622694 | 2014 QN_{349} | — | October 1, 2009 | Mount Lemmon | Mount Lemmon Survey | · | 1.4 km | MPC · JPL |
| 622695 | 2014 QG_{359} | — | August 27, 2014 | Haleakala | Pan-STARRS 1 | EOS | 1.6 km | MPC · JPL |
| 622696 | 2014 QO_{366} | — | July 29, 2009 | Dauban | C. Rinner, Kugel, F. | DOR | 2.0 km | MPC · JPL |
| 622697 | 2014 QH_{381} | — | February 7, 2011 | Mount Lemmon | Mount Lemmon Survey | · | 2.0 km | MPC · JPL |
| 622698 | 2014 QQ_{382} | — | July 29, 2014 | Haleakala | Pan-STARRS 1 | · | 1.3 km | MPC · JPL |
| 622699 | 2014 QX_{383} | — | October 1, 2005 | Kitt Peak | Spacewatch | · | 1.2 km | MPC · JPL |
| 622700 | 2014 QX_{404} | — | August 28, 2014 | Haleakala | Pan-STARRS 1 | · | 1.8 km | MPC · JPL |

== 622701–622800 ==
back to top

| Designation | | | Discovery | | | Properties | | Ref |
| Permanent | Provisional | Named after | Date | Site | Discoverer(s) | Category | Diam. | Ref |
|---|---|---|---|---|---|---|---|---|
| 622701 | 2014 QQ_{411} | — | July 25, 2014 | Haleakala | Pan-STARRS 1 | KOR | 1.2 km | MPC · JPL |
| 622702 | 2014 QN_{417} | — | September 23, 2009 | Mount Lemmon | Mount Lemmon Survey | · | 1.7 km | MPC · JPL |
| 622703 | 2014 QO_{422} | — | October 5, 2005 | Catalina | CSS | DOR | 1.6 km | MPC · JPL |
| 622704 | 2014 QS_{423} | — | August 18, 2009 | Kitt Peak | Spacewatch | · | 1.8 km | MPC · JPL |
| 622705 | 2014 QZ_{438} | — | August 31, 2014 | Haleakala | Pan-STARRS 1 | · | 2.1 km | MPC · JPL |
| 622706 | 2014 QD_{439} | — | August 31, 2014 | Haleakala | Pan-STARRS 1 | · | 1.9 km | MPC · JPL |
| 622707 | 2014 QY_{447} | — | September 22, 1995 | Kitt Peak | Spacewatch | KOR | 1.2 km | MPC · JPL |
| 622708 | 2014 QQ_{454} | — | August 30, 2014 | Haleakala | Pan-STARRS 1 | · | 1.7 km | MPC · JPL |
| 622709 | 2014 QB_{455} | — | November 8, 2009 | Mount Lemmon | Mount Lemmon Survey | THM | 1.4 km | MPC · JPL |
| 622710 | 2014 QW_{460} | — | September 16, 2009 | Kitt Peak | Spacewatch | · | 1.4 km | MPC · JPL |
| 622711 | 2014 QD_{465} | — | August 23, 2014 | Haleakala | Pan-STARRS 1 | · | 1.7 km | MPC · JPL |
| 622712 | 2014 QO_{472} | — | August 31, 2014 | Kitt Peak | Spacewatch | · | 1.5 km | MPC · JPL |
| 622713 | 2014 QE_{473} | — | August 15, 2009 | Kitt Peak | Spacewatch | · | 1.4 km | MPC · JPL |
| 622714 | 2014 QB_{475} | — | June 30, 2005 | Kitt Peak | Spacewatch | · | 1.8 km | MPC · JPL |
| 622715 | 2014 QY_{475} | — | March 31, 2009 | Mount Lemmon | Mount Lemmon Survey | · | 1.4 km | MPC · JPL |
| 622716 | 2014 QW_{483} | — | May 10, 2003 | Kitt Peak | Spacewatch | · | 1.7 km | MPC · JPL |
| 622717 | 2014 QC_{487} | — | June 30, 2014 | Haleakala | Pan-STARRS 1 | · | 1.5 km | MPC · JPL |
| 622718 | 2014 QX_{491} | — | January 2, 2011 | Mount Lemmon | Mount Lemmon Survey | · | 1.4 km | MPC · JPL |
| 622719 | 2014 QC_{494} | — | October 18, 2009 | La Sagra | OAM | · | 1.9 km | MPC · JPL |
| 622720 | 2014 QB_{495} | — | August 28, 2014 | Haleakala | Pan-STARRS 1 | · | 540 m | MPC · JPL |
| 622721 | 2014 QZ_{497} | — | December 9, 2015 | Haleakala | Pan-STARRS 1 | EOS | 1.3 km | MPC · JPL |
| 622722 | 2014 QH_{515} | — | December 3, 2015 | Mount Lemmon | Mount Lemmon Survey | · | 2.1 km | MPC · JPL |
| 622723 | 2014 QO_{518} | — | August 28, 2014 | Haleakala | Pan-STARRS 1 | · | 2.4 km | MPC · JPL |
| 622724 | 2014 QC_{519} | — | February 25, 2007 | Mount Lemmon | Mount Lemmon Survey | · | 1.7 km | MPC · JPL |
| 622725 | 2014 QE_{519} | — | August 22, 2014 | Haleakala | Pan-STARRS 1 | VER | 1.9 km | MPC · JPL |
| 622726 | 2014 QX_{523} | — | August 30, 2014 | Mount Lemmon | Mount Lemmon Survey | · | 1.5 km | MPC · JPL |
| 622727 | 2014 RA_{20} | — | July 29, 2009 | Kitt Peak | Spacewatch | · | 1.6 km | MPC · JPL |
| 622728 | 2014 RG_{38} | — | August 20, 2014 | Haleakala | Pan-STARRS 1 | · | 1.8 km | MPC · JPL |
| 622729 | 2014 RK_{45} | — | September 17, 2003 | Kitt Peak | Spacewatch | EMA | 2.1 km | MPC · JPL |
| 622730 | 2014 RV_{46} | — | September 14, 2014 | Mount Lemmon | Mount Lemmon Survey | · | 1.9 km | MPC · JPL |
| 622731 | 2014 RS_{66} | — | October 27, 2009 | Mount Lemmon | Mount Lemmon Survey | · | 2.0 km | MPC · JPL |
| 622732 | 2014 RU_{68} | — | April 27, 2012 | Haleakala | Pan-STARRS 1 | TIR | 2.1 km | MPC · JPL |
| 622733 | 2014 RQ_{69} | — | September 18, 2009 | Kitt Peak | Spacewatch | · | 1.3 km | MPC · JPL |
| 622734 | 2014 RA_{73} | — | October 24, 2008 | Catalina | CSS | · | 2.6 km | MPC · JPL |
| 622735 | 2014 SO_{94} | — | September 2, 2014 | Haleakala | Pan-STARRS 1 | · | 1.6 km | MPC · JPL |
| 622736 | 2014 SJ_{101} | — | September 21, 2003 | Kitt Peak | Spacewatch | THM | 1.5 km | MPC · JPL |
| 622737 | 2014 SK_{104} | — | April 6, 2008 | Mount Lemmon | Mount Lemmon Survey | · | 1.4 km | MPC · JPL |
| 622738 | 2014 SX_{111} | — | February 11, 2011 | Mount Lemmon | Mount Lemmon Survey | · | 1.9 km | MPC · JPL |
| 622739 | 2014 SN_{118} | — | September 15, 2009 | Kitt Peak | Spacewatch | · | 1.5 km | MPC · JPL |
| 622740 | 2014 SO_{133} | — | September 29, 2003 | Kitt Peak | Spacewatch | · | 2.2 km | MPC · JPL |
| 622741 | 2014 SP_{134} | — | November 18, 2009 | Mount Lemmon | Mount Lemmon Survey | · | 1.6 km | MPC · JPL |
| 622742 | 2014 SK_{179} | — | November 5, 2005 | Kitt Peak | Spacewatch | · | 1.4 km | MPC · JPL |
| 622743 | 2014 SS_{209} | — | September 4, 2014 | Haleakala | Pan-STARRS 1 | · | 2.3 km | MPC · JPL |
| 622744 | 2014 SV_{212} | — | September 20, 2014 | Haleakala | Pan-STARRS 1 | · | 2.2 km | MPC · JPL |
| 622745 | 2014 SL_{217} | — | September 4, 2014 | Haleakala | Pan-STARRS 1 | TIR | 2.3 km | MPC · JPL |
| 622746 | 2014 SU_{218} | — | August 23, 2007 | Kitt Peak | Spacewatch | · | 570 m | MPC · JPL |
| 622747 | 2014 SK_{241} | — | July 7, 2014 | Haleakala | Pan-STARRS 1 | · | 530 m | MPC · JPL |
| 622748 | 2014 SS_{242} | — | September 22, 2009 | Mount Lemmon | Mount Lemmon Survey | · | 2.2 km | MPC · JPL |
| 622749 | 2014 SY_{245} | — | September 22, 2014 | Haleakala | Pan-STARRS 1 | · | 2.0 km | MPC · JPL |
| 622750 | 2014 SF_{254} | — | September 2, 2014 | Haleakala | Pan-STARRS 1 | · | 2.3 km | MPC · JPL |
| 622751 | 2014 SB_{256} | — | June 3, 2014 | Haleakala | Pan-STARRS 1 | · | 460 m | MPC · JPL |
| 622752 | 2014 ST_{262} | — | January 8, 2010 | Kitt Peak | Spacewatch | · | 2.7 km | MPC · JPL |
| 622753 | 2014 SJ_{305} | — | April 3, 2010 | Kitt Peak | Spacewatch | · | 650 m | MPC · JPL |
| 622754 | 2014 SB_{313} | — | November 24, 2009 | Kitt Peak | Spacewatch | · | 2.0 km | MPC · JPL |
| 622755 | 2014 ST_{314} | — | September 23, 2003 | Palomar | NEAT | · | 2.1 km | MPC · JPL |
| 622756 | 2014 SE_{325} | — | October 5, 2004 | Kitt Peak | Spacewatch | KOR | 1.3 km | MPC · JPL |
| 622757 | 2014 SB_{326} | — | October 12, 2009 | Mount Lemmon | Mount Lemmon Survey | · | 1.8 km | MPC · JPL |
| 622758 | 2014 SL_{328} | — | October 20, 2003 | Kitt Peak | Spacewatch | · | 2.3 km | MPC · JPL |
| 622759 | 2014 SJ_{339} | — | September 2, 2014 | Haleakala | Pan-STARRS 1 | · | 2.1 km | MPC · JPL |
| 622760 | 2014 SH_{342} | — | September 29, 2014 | Haleakala | Pan-STARRS 1 | · | 2.1 km | MPC · JPL |
| 622761 | 2014 SP_{342} | — | September 16, 2009 | Mount Lemmon | Mount Lemmon Survey | EOS | 1.5 km | MPC · JPL |
| 622762 | 2014 SC_{344} | — | November 22, 2011 | Mount Lemmon | Mount Lemmon Survey | · | 610 m | MPC · JPL |
| 622763 | 2014 SD_{345} | — | October 23, 2009 | Mount Lemmon | Mount Lemmon Survey | EOS | 1.5 km | MPC · JPL |
| 622764 | 2014 SJ_{360} | — | September 19, 2014 | Haleakala | Pan-STARRS 1 | · | 1.7 km | MPC · JPL |
| 622765 | 2014 SX_{361} | — | September 24, 2014 | Kitt Peak | Spacewatch | · | 1.8 km | MPC · JPL |
| 622766 | 2014 SX_{364} | — | September 20, 2014 | Haleakala | Pan-STARRS 1 | · | 410 m | MPC · JPL |
| 622767 | 2014 SY_{375} | — | September 25, 2014 | Kitt Peak | Spacewatch | · | 2.1 km | MPC · JPL |
| 622768 | 2014 SF_{381} | — | September 19, 2014 | Haleakala | Pan-STARRS 1 | VER | 2.2 km | MPC · JPL |
| 622769 | 2014 TH | — | October 23, 2011 | Haleakala | Pan-STARRS 1 | · | 710 m | MPC · JPL |
| 622770 | 2014 TX_{14} | — | May 14, 2008 | Mount Lemmon | Mount Lemmon Survey | · | 1.5 km | MPC · JPL |
| 622771 | 2014 TO_{22} | — | September 23, 2014 | Kitt Peak | Spacewatch | · | 1.7 km | MPC · JPL |
| 622772 | 2014 TN_{26} | — | September 25, 2009 | Catalina | CSS | · | 1.5 km | MPC · JPL |
| 622773 | 2014 TF_{31} | — | October 14, 2009 | Mount Lemmon | Mount Lemmon Survey | EOS | 1.6 km | MPC · JPL |
| 622774 | 2014 TS_{32} | — | November 16, 2009 | Mount Lemmon | Mount Lemmon Survey | · | 3.2 km | MPC · JPL |
| 622775 | 2014 TU_{44} | — | September 28, 2003 | Kitt Peak | Spacewatch | · | 2.1 km | MPC · JPL |
| 622776 | 2014 TF_{45} | — | September 24, 2014 | Kitt Peak | Spacewatch | · | 1.7 km | MPC · JPL |
| 622777 | 2014 TK_{46} | — | September 19, 2003 | Kitt Peak | Spacewatch | · | 1.9 km | MPC · JPL |
| 622778 | 2014 TQ_{51} | — | November 8, 2009 | Mount Lemmon | Mount Lemmon Survey | EOS | 1.6 km | MPC · JPL |
| 622779 | 2014 TU_{60} | — | October 13, 2014 | Mount Lemmon | Mount Lemmon Survey | · | 650 m | MPC · JPL |
| 622780 | 2014 TC_{90} | — | September 8, 2004 | Apache Point | SDSS Collaboration | 615 | 1.2 km | MPC · JPL |
| 622781 | 2014 TQ_{96} | — | October 2, 2014 | Haleakala | Pan-STARRS 1 | EOS | 1.3 km | MPC · JPL |
| 622782 | 2014 TN_{104} | — | October 1, 2014 | Haleakala | Pan-STARRS 1 | · | 2.2 km | MPC · JPL |
| 622783 | 2014 TN_{109} | — | October 5, 2014 | Kitt Peak | Spacewatch | · | 2.4 km | MPC · JPL |
| 622784 | 2014 UC | — | September 2, 2014 | Haleakala | Pan-STARRS 1 | · | 1.4 km | MPC · JPL |
| 622785 | 2014 UK_{6} | — | October 24, 2011 | Haleakala | Pan-STARRS 1 | · | 580 m | MPC · JPL |
| 622786 | 2014 UO_{24} | — | September 5, 2008 | Kitt Peak | Spacewatch | · | 2.2 km | MPC · JPL |
| 622787 | 2014 UU_{27} | — | April 28, 2012 | Mount Lemmon | Mount Lemmon Survey | · | 2.4 km | MPC · JPL |
| 622788 | 2014 UG_{44} | — | October 21, 2014 | Kitt Peak | Spacewatch | · | 1.9 km | MPC · JPL |
| 622789 | 2014 UQ_{51} | — | September 23, 2008 | Mount Lemmon | Mount Lemmon Survey | · | 2.7 km | MPC · JPL |
| 622790 | 2014 UP_{52} | — | October 3, 2014 | Mount Lemmon | Mount Lemmon Survey | · | 2.4 km | MPC · JPL |
| 622791 | 2014 UW_{54} | — | October 18, 2003 | Kitt Peak | Spacewatch | THM | 2.1 km | MPC · JPL |
| 622792 | 2014 UK_{57} | — | September 15, 2004 | Socorro | LINEAR | T_{j} (2.98) | 2.2 km | MPC · JPL |
| 622793 | 2014 UB_{67} | — | September 2, 2014 | Haleakala | Pan-STARRS 1 | VER | 2.2 km | MPC · JPL |
| 622794 | 2014 UR_{67} | — | July 29, 2003 | Campo Imperatore | CINEOS | · | 2.0 km | MPC · JPL |
| 622795 | 2014 UU_{72} | — | April 14, 2007 | Mount Lemmon | Mount Lemmon Survey | · | 2.0 km | MPC · JPL |
| 622796 | 2014 UN_{78} | — | September 22, 2009 | Mount Lemmon | Mount Lemmon Survey | EOS | 1.5 km | MPC · JPL |
| 622797 | 2014 UG_{83} | — | October 1, 2003 | Anderson Mesa | LONEOS | · | 2.3 km | MPC · JPL |
| 622798 | 2014 UN_{84} | — | December 1, 2003 | Kitt Peak | Spacewatch | · | 2.5 km | MPC · JPL |
| 622799 | 2014 UE_{100} | — | September 15, 2009 | Kitt Peak | Spacewatch | · | 1.6 km | MPC · JPL |
| 622800 | 2014 UB_{109} | — | August 23, 2008 | Kitt Peak | Spacewatch | THM | 2.0 km | MPC · JPL |

== 622801–622900 ==
back to top

| Designation | | | Discovery | | | Properties | | Ref |
| Permanent | Provisional | Named after | Date | Site | Discoverer(s) | Category | Diam. | Ref |
|---|---|---|---|---|---|---|---|---|
| 622801 | 2014 UK_{117} | — | August 8, 2004 | Palomar | NEAT | · | 480 m | MPC · JPL |
| 622802 | 2014 UX_{119} | — | October 10, 2004 | Kitt Peak | Spacewatch | KOR | 1.2 km | MPC · JPL |
| 622803 | 2014 UY_{123} | — | October 3, 2014 | Mount Lemmon | Mount Lemmon Survey | · | 2.2 km | MPC · JPL |
| 622804 | 2014 UD_{133} | — | September 5, 2008 | Kitt Peak | Spacewatch | EOS | 1.7 km | MPC · JPL |
| 622805 | 2014 UH_{141} | — | October 14, 2014 | Kitt Peak | Spacewatch | · | 2.1 km | MPC · JPL |
| 622806 | 2014 UH_{151} | — | October 25, 2014 | Mount Lemmon | Mount Lemmon Survey | HYG | 2.0 km | MPC · JPL |
| 622807 | 2014 UB_{156} | — | October 3, 2003 | Kitt Peak | Spacewatch | · | 2.0 km | MPC · JPL |
| 622808 | 2014 UP_{157} | — | August 31, 2014 | Haleakala | Pan-STARRS 1 | · | 2.0 km | MPC · JPL |
| 622809 | 2014 UN_{162} | — | October 16, 2014 | Kitt Peak | Spacewatch | · | 2.5 km | MPC · JPL |
| 622810 | 2014 UO_{186} | — | October 27, 2003 | Kitt Peak | Spacewatch | · | 1.8 km | MPC · JPL |
| 622811 | 2014 UZ_{198} | — | October 26, 2014 | Mount Lemmon | Mount Lemmon Survey | · | 2.2 km | MPC · JPL |
| 622812 | 2014 UP_{199} | — | October 26, 2014 | Mount Lemmon | Mount Lemmon Survey | · | 640 m | MPC · JPL |
| 622813 | 2014 UK_{207} | — | September 19, 1998 | Apache Point | SDSS | · | 1.8 km | MPC · JPL |
| 622814 | 2014 US_{222} | — | April 12, 2013 | Haleakala | Pan-STARRS 1 | · | 1.8 km | MPC · JPL |
| 622815 | 2014 UA_{231} | — | October 10, 2008 | Mount Lemmon | Mount Lemmon Survey | · | 2.2 km | MPC · JPL |
| 622816 | 2014 UL_{244} | — | October 28, 2014 | Haleakala | Pan-STARRS 1 | · | 2.2 km | MPC · JPL |
| 622817 | 2014 UZ_{244} | — | October 23, 2014 | Nogales | M. Schwartz, P. R. Holvorcem | · | 1.6 km | MPC · JPL |
| 622818 | 2014 UN_{258} | — | October 28, 2014 | Mount Lemmon | Mount Lemmon Survey | · | 750 m | MPC · JPL |
| 622819 | 2014 UF_{271} | — | October 28, 2014 | Haleakala | Pan-STARRS 1 | VER | 1.9 km | MPC · JPL |
| 622820 | 2014 VE_{7} | — | September 19, 2003 | Kitt Peak | Spacewatch | · | 2.3 km | MPC · JPL |
| 622821 | 2014 VR_{10} | — | November 10, 2014 | Haleakala | Pan-STARRS 1 | · | 2.2 km | MPC · JPL |
| 622822 | 2014 VA_{19} | — | November 8, 2009 | Mount Lemmon | Mount Lemmon Survey | · | 1.9 km | MPC · JPL |
| 622823 | 2014 VD_{22} | — | November 12, 1999 | Kitt Peak | Spacewatch | · | 1.8 km | MPC · JPL |
| 622824 | 2014 VF_{29} | — | April 16, 2013 | Cerro Tololo-DECam | DECam | · | 470 m | MPC · JPL |
| 622825 | 2014 VB_{31} | — | November 14, 2014 | Kitt Peak | Spacewatch | · | 2.4 km | MPC · JPL |
| 622826 | 2014 VO_{31} | — | November 14, 2014 | Kitt Peak | Spacewatch | · | 2.7 km | MPC · JPL |
| 622827 | 2014 VR_{40} | — | November 1, 2014 | Mount Lemmon | Mount Lemmon Survey | · | 2.5 km | MPC · JPL |
| 622828 | 2014 WR_{9} | — | September 21, 2009 | Mount Lemmon | Mount Lemmon Survey | KOR | 1.2 km | MPC · JPL |
| 622829 | 2014 WJ_{15} | — | November 16, 2014 | Mount Lemmon | Mount Lemmon Survey | L5 | 6.7 km | MPC · JPL |
| 622830 | 2014 WQ_{19} | — | September 24, 2014 | Kitt Peak | Spacewatch | · | 510 m | MPC · JPL |
| 622831 | 2014 WL_{23} | — | October 25, 2014 | Haleakala | Pan-STARRS 1 | · | 2.1 km | MPC · JPL |
| 622832 | 2014 WA_{27} | — | October 8, 2008 | Mount Lemmon | Mount Lemmon Survey | · | 2.0 km | MPC · JPL |
| 622833 | 2014 WD_{44} | — | November 17, 2014 | Mount Lemmon | Mount Lemmon Survey | · | 1.9 km | MPC · JPL |
| 622834 | 2014 WT_{49} | — | October 23, 2014 | Kitt Peak | Spacewatch | · | 2.9 km | MPC · JPL |
| 622835 | 2014 WE_{52} | — | October 16, 2003 | Palomar | NEAT | · | 2.5 km | MPC · JPL |
| 622836 | 2014 WX_{60} | — | October 25, 2014 | Haleakala | Pan-STARRS 1 | EOS | 1.6 km | MPC · JPL |
| 622837 | 2014 WO_{61} | — | April 27, 2012 | Haleakala | Pan-STARRS 1 | · | 2.0 km | MPC · JPL |
| 622838 | 2014 WX_{64} | — | October 22, 2003 | Apache Point | SDSS Collaboration | · | 1.7 km | MPC · JPL |
| 622839 | 2014 WN_{68} | — | October 25, 2014 | Haleakala | Pan-STARRS 1 | · | 2.4 km | MPC · JPL |
| 622840 | 2014 WA_{70} | — | November 19, 2014 | Mount Lemmon | Mount Lemmon Survey | · | 560 m | MPC · JPL |
| 622841 | 2014 WO_{74} | — | November 17, 2014 | Mount Lemmon | Mount Lemmon Survey | · | 2.2 km | MPC · JPL |
| 622842 | 2014 WJ_{77} | — | March 16, 2013 | Kitt Peak | Spacewatch | · | 550 m | MPC · JPL |
| 622843 | 2014 WC_{82} | — | October 13, 2007 | Mount Lemmon | Mount Lemmon Survey | · | 590 m | MPC · JPL |
| 622844 | 2014 WH_{83} | — | October 3, 2008 | Kitt Peak | Spacewatch | · | 2.2 km | MPC · JPL |
| 622845 | 2014 WE_{93} | — | September 23, 2008 | Kitt Peak | Spacewatch | · | 2.2 km | MPC · JPL |
| 622846 | 2014 WL_{103} | — | October 15, 2014 | Mount Lemmon | Mount Lemmon Survey | · | 2.2 km | MPC · JPL |
| 622847 | 2014 WG_{111} | — | October 14, 2009 | Mount Lemmon | Mount Lemmon Survey | · | 1.6 km | MPC · JPL |
| 622848 | 2014 WH_{112} | — | November 18, 2014 | Haleakala | Pan-STARRS 1 | · | 2.5 km | MPC · JPL |
| 622849 | 2014 WE_{125} | — | November 16, 2014 | Mount Lemmon | Mount Lemmon Survey | · | 520 m | MPC · JPL |
| 622850 | 2014 WH_{131} | — | November 17, 2014 | Haleakala | Pan-STARRS 1 | · | 1.4 km | MPC · JPL |
| 622851 | 2014 WM_{131} | — | July 12, 2013 | Haleakala | Pan-STARRS 1 | · | 1.8 km | MPC · JPL |
| 622852 | 2014 WN_{133} | — | September 29, 2008 | Kitt Peak | Spacewatch | ARM | 2.5 km | MPC · JPL |
| 622853 | 2014 WH_{134} | — | October 21, 2003 | Kitt Peak | Spacewatch | · | 2.0 km | MPC · JPL |
| 622854 | 2014 WW_{138} | — | August 7, 2008 | Kitt Peak | Spacewatch | · | 1.9 km | MPC · JPL |
| 622855 | 2014 WH_{139} | — | October 16, 2014 | Mount Lemmon | Mount Lemmon Survey | · | 1.9 km | MPC · JPL |
| 622856 | 2014 WY_{153} | — | November 17, 2014 | Haleakala | Pan-STARRS 1 | · | 2.2 km | MPC · JPL |
| 622857 | 2014 WV_{163} | — | September 15, 2009 | Kitt Peak | Spacewatch | 615 | 1.0 km | MPC · JPL |
| 622858 | 2014 WJ_{177} | — | February 28, 2012 | Haleakala | Pan-STARRS 1 | · | 1.7 km | MPC · JPL |
| 622859 | 2014 WC_{197} | — | September 29, 2008 | Mount Lemmon | Mount Lemmon Survey | · | 2.0 km | MPC · JPL |
| 622860 | 2014 WU_{199} | — | July 2, 2013 | Haleakala | Pan-STARRS 1 | · | 2.2 km | MPC · JPL |
| 622861 | 2014 WL_{218} | — | May 20, 2010 | Mount Lemmon | Mount Lemmon Survey | · | 480 m | MPC · JPL |
| 622862 | 2014 WT_{223} | — | November 18, 2014 | Haleakala | Pan-STARRS 1 | · | 1.8 km | MPC · JPL |
| 622863 | 2014 WU_{231} | — | November 12, 2005 | Kitt Peak | Spacewatch | DOR | 1.9 km | MPC · JPL |
| 622864 | 2014 WV_{238} | — | November 20, 2014 | Haleakala | Pan-STARRS 1 | · | 560 m | MPC · JPL |
| 622865 | 2014 WR_{239} | — | October 12, 1998 | Kitt Peak | Spacewatch | · | 1.8 km | MPC · JPL |
| 622866 | 2014 WF_{253} | — | October 28, 2014 | Catalina | CSS | · | 1.9 km | MPC · JPL |
| 622867 | 2014 WQ_{264} | — | August 28, 2003 | Cerro Tololo | I. P. Griffin, Miranda, A. | · | 1.6 km | MPC · JPL |
| 622868 | 2014 WU_{281} | — | July 30, 2008 | Kitt Peak | Spacewatch | · | 2.2 km | MPC · JPL |
| 622869 | 2014 WC_{300} | — | January 31, 2009 | Mount Lemmon | Mount Lemmon Survey | · | 630 m | MPC · JPL |
| 622870 | 2014 WD_{300} | — | October 1, 2008 | Mount Lemmon | Mount Lemmon Survey | · | 2.4 km | MPC · JPL |
| 622871 | 2014 WY_{302} | — | September 30, 2003 | Kitt Peak | Spacewatch | EOS | 1.6 km | MPC · JPL |
| 622872 | 2014 WZ_{315} | — | August 25, 2014 | Haleakala | Pan-STARRS 1 | · | 1.8 km | MPC · JPL |
| 622873 | 2014 WB_{320} | — | September 16, 2014 | Haleakala | Pan-STARRS 1 | · | 1.8 km | MPC · JPL |
| 622874 | 2014 WL_{325} | — | July 15, 2013 | Haleakala | Pan-STARRS 1 | · | 2.1 km | MPC · JPL |
| 622875 | 2014 WN_{326} | — | September 6, 2008 | Mount Lemmon | Mount Lemmon Survey | EOS | 1.3 km | MPC · JPL |
| 622876 | 2014 WN_{346} | — | June 18, 2013 | Haleakala | Pan-STARRS 1 | · | 1.6 km | MPC · JPL |
| 622877 | 2014 WY_{349} | — | November 24, 2003 | Kitt Peak | Spacewatch | (1118) | 2.8 km | MPC · JPL |
| 622878 | 2014 WQ_{352} | — | October 17, 2003 | Kitt Peak | Spacewatch | · | 2.2 km | MPC · JPL |
| 622879 | 2014 WP_{357} | — | October 28, 2014 | Haleakala | Pan-STARRS 1 | · | 2.8 km | MPC · JPL |
| 622880 | 2014 WO_{358} | — | October 24, 2005 | Mauna Kea | A. Boattini | L5 | 8.2 km | MPC · JPL |
| 622881 | 2014 WL_{390} | — | June 16, 2009 | Mount Lemmon | Mount Lemmon Survey | · | 1.5 km | MPC · JPL |
| 622882 | 2014 WJ_{396} | — | November 25, 2014 | Haleakala | Pan-STARRS 1 | · | 3.1 km | MPC · JPL |
| 622883 | 2014 WU_{401} | — | April 28, 2012 | Kitt Peak | Spacewatch | · | 2.4 km | MPC · JPL |
| 622884 | 2014 WR_{407} | — | November 26, 2014 | Haleakala | Pan-STARRS 1 | · | 740 m | MPC · JPL |
| 622885 | 2014 WM_{408} | — | November 26, 2014 | Haleakala | Pan-STARRS 1 | MAS | 530 m | MPC · JPL |
| 622886 | 2014 WR_{417} | — | November 26, 2014 | Haleakala | Pan-STARRS 1 | · | 2.3 km | MPC · JPL |
| 622887 | 2014 WY_{420} | — | September 27, 2008 | Mount Lemmon | Mount Lemmon Survey | · | 2.3 km | MPC · JPL |
| 622888 | 2014 WR_{436} | — | October 15, 2009 | Mount Lemmon | Mount Lemmon Survey | · | 3.4 km | MPC · JPL |
| 622889 | 2014 WZ_{441} | — | December 19, 2004 | Mount Lemmon | Mount Lemmon Survey | · | 2.0 km | MPC · JPL |
| 622890 | 2014 WT_{466} | — | September 28, 2003 | Apache Point | SDSS Collaboration | · | 2.0 km | MPC · JPL |
| 622891 | 2014 WE_{471} | — | October 28, 2014 | Kitt Peak | Spacewatch | · | 1.9 km | MPC · JPL |
| 622892 | 2014 WQ_{483} | — | November 4, 2014 | Mount Lemmon | Mount Lemmon Survey | · | 550 m | MPC · JPL |
| 622893 | 2014 WO_{501} | — | October 14, 2014 | Kitt Peak | Spacewatch | · | 2.4 km | MPC · JPL |
| 622894 | 2014 WR_{512} | — | November 10, 2009 | Kitt Peak | Spacewatch | H | 330 m | MPC · JPL |
| 622895 | 2014 WN_{518} | — | September 10, 2008 | Kitt Peak | Spacewatch | · | 1.8 km | MPC · JPL |
| 622896 | 2014 WW_{521} | — | October 29, 2003 | Kitt Peak | Spacewatch | EOS | 1.5 km | MPC · JPL |
| 622897 | 2014 WT_{525} | — | August 15, 2013 | Haleakala | Pan-STARRS 1 | URS | 2.3 km | MPC · JPL |
| 622898 | 2014 WY_{536} | — | November 23, 2014 | Haleakala | Pan-STARRS 1 | · | 510 m | MPC · JPL |
| 622899 | 2014 WA_{537} | — | November 28, 2014 | Haleakala | Pan-STARRS 1 | · | 480 m | MPC · JPL |
| 622900 | 2014 WW_{562} | — | January 9, 2016 | Haleakala | Pan-STARRS 1 | · | 2.6 km | MPC · JPL |

== 622901–623000 ==
back to top

| Designation | | | Discovery | | | Properties | | Ref |
| Permanent | Provisional | Named after | Date | Site | Discoverer(s) | Category | Diam. | Ref |
|---|---|---|---|---|---|---|---|---|
| 622901 | 2014 WJ_{569} | — | February 7, 2011 | Mount Lemmon | Mount Lemmon Survey | · | 1.6 km | MPC · JPL |
| 622902 | 2014 WF_{575} | — | November 23, 2014 | Haleakala | Pan-STARRS 1 | · | 620 m | MPC · JPL |
| 622903 | 2014 WT_{575} | — | November 27, 2014 | Haleakala | Pan-STARRS 1 | L5 | 9.8 km | MPC · JPL |
| 622904 | 2014 WS_{611} | — | November 27, 2014 | Haleakala | Pan-STARRS 1 | · | 2.4 km | MPC · JPL |
| 622905 | 2014 XL_{12} | — | November 17, 2014 | Haleakala | Pan-STARRS 1 | · | 640 m | MPC · JPL |
| 622906 | 2014 XV_{21} | — | September 28, 2008 | Catalina | CSS | · | 2.5 km | MPC · JPL |
| 622907 | 2014 XG_{42} | — | September 28, 2008 | Mount Lemmon | Mount Lemmon Survey | · | 2.0 km | MPC · JPL |
| 622908 | 2014 YM_{42} | — | January 16, 2005 | Mauna Kea | Veillet, C. | L5 | 7.8 km | MPC · JPL |
| 622909 | 2014 YE_{51} | — | December 30, 2014 | Haleakala | Pan-STARRS 1 | H | 340 m | MPC · JPL |
| 622910 | 2014 YP_{58} | — | December 21, 2014 | Mount Lemmon | Mount Lemmon Survey | · | 2.7 km | MPC · JPL |
| 622911 | 2014 YC_{68} | — | December 26, 2014 | Haleakala | Pan-STARRS 1 | LUT | 3.0 km | MPC · JPL |
| 622912 | 2014 YG_{68} | — | November 7, 2008 | Catalina | CSS | · | 2.6 km | MPC · JPL |
| 622913 | 2014 YW_{95} | — | December 29, 2014 | Haleakala | Pan-STARRS 1 | · | 1.5 km | MPC · JPL |
| 622914 | 2015 AZ_{2} | — | January 11, 2015 | Haleakala | Pan-STARRS 1 | · | 290 m | MPC · JPL |
| 622915 | 2015 AS_{14} | — | January 11, 2015 | Haleakala | Pan-STARRS 1 | · | 3.0 km | MPC · JPL |
| 622916 | 2015 AH_{22} | — | May 21, 2012 | Haleakala | Pan-STARRS 1 | · | 3.4 km | MPC · JPL |
| 622917 | 2015 AR_{59} | — | August 10, 2007 | Kitt Peak | Spacewatch | · | 2.0 km | MPC · JPL |
| 622918 | 2015 AM_{60} | — | April 20, 2012 | Kitt Peak | Spacewatch | NYS | 680 m | MPC · JPL |
| 622919 | 2015 AK_{73} | — | February 26, 2008 | Mount Lemmon | Mount Lemmon Survey | · | 1.1 km | MPC · JPL |
| 622920 | 2015 AR_{73} | — | February 11, 2008 | Kitt Peak | Spacewatch | NYS | 940 m | MPC · JPL |
| 622921 | 2015 AX_{97} | — | July 16, 2013 | Haleakala | Pan-STARRS 1 | TIR | 2.3 km | MPC · JPL |
| 622922 | 2015 AL_{124} | — | July 2, 2013 | Haleakala | Pan-STARRS 1 | · | 720 m | MPC · JPL |
| 622923 | 2015 AO_{141} | — | September 21, 2003 | Kitt Peak | Spacewatch | · | 500 m | MPC · JPL |
| 622924 | 2015 AR_{152} | — | September 11, 2007 | Kitt Peak | Spacewatch | THM | 1.8 km | MPC · JPL |
| 622925 | 2015 AW_{168} | — | September 18, 2003 | Kitt Peak | Spacewatch | · | 590 m | MPC · JPL |
| 622926 | 2015 AF_{223} | — | November 2, 2007 | Mount Lemmon | Mount Lemmon Survey | · | 500 m | MPC · JPL |
| 622927 | 2015 AT_{229} | — | January 15, 2015 | Haleakala | Pan-STARRS 1 | V | 480 m | MPC · JPL |
| 622928 | 2015 AR_{239} | — | August 27, 2009 | Catalina | CSS | PHO | 830 m | MPC · JPL |
| 622929 | 2015 AC_{268} | — | June 18, 2013 | Haleakala | Pan-STARRS 1 | · | 780 m | MPC · JPL |
| 622930 | 2015 AG_{298} | — | January 14, 2015 | Haleakala | Pan-STARRS 1 | · | 2.4 km | MPC · JPL |
| 622931 | 2015 AH_{299} | — | January 13, 2015 | Haleakala | Pan-STARRS 1 | · | 510 m | MPC · JPL |
| 622932 | 2015 BW_{2} | — | January 16, 2015 | Haleakala | Pan-STARRS 1 | · | 840 m | MPC · JPL |
| 622933 | 2015 BW_{16} | — | November 26, 2003 | Kitt Peak | Spacewatch | · | 760 m | MPC · JPL |
| 622934 | 2015 BT_{21} | — | August 15, 2013 | Haleakala | Pan-STARRS 1 | · | 650 m | MPC · JPL |
| 622935 | 2015 BK_{41} | — | December 29, 2014 | Haleakala | Pan-STARRS 1 | EUP | 3.2 km | MPC · JPL |
| 622936 | 2015 BC_{53} | — | September 29, 2013 | Haleakala | Pan-STARRS 1 | · | 3.1 km | MPC · JPL |
| 622937 | 2015 BQ_{66} | — | March 31, 2008 | Mount Lemmon | Mount Lemmon Survey | · | 850 m | MPC · JPL |
| 622938 | 2015 BS_{68} | — | January 15, 2015 | Haleakala | Pan-STARRS 1 | · | 2.6 km | MPC · JPL |
| 622939 | 2015 BJ_{113} | — | April 6, 2008 | Mount Lemmon | Mount Lemmon Survey | · | 890 m | MPC · JPL |
| 622940 | 2015 BC_{115} | — | February 12, 2008 | Mount Lemmon | Mount Lemmon Survey | · | 1.0 km | MPC · JPL |
| 622941 | 2015 BY_{137} | — | September 18, 2003 | Kitt Peak | Spacewatch | · | 530 m | MPC · JPL |
| 622942 | 2015 BC_{189} | — | January 17, 2015 | Haleakala | Pan-STARRS 1 | · | 730 m | MPC · JPL |
| 622943 | 2015 BJ_{204} | — | September 23, 2013 | Catalina | CSS | · | 3.2 km | MPC · JPL |
| 622944 | 2015 BO_{212} | — | April 15, 2012 | Haleakala | Pan-STARRS 1 | · | 710 m | MPC · JPL |
| 622945 | 2015 BS_{226} | — | November 26, 2003 | Kitt Peak | Spacewatch | · | 850 m | MPC · JPL |
| 622946 | 2015 BQ_{265} | — | September 19, 2007 | Kitt Peak | Spacewatch | · | 2.7 km | MPC · JPL |
| 622947 | 2015 BO_{300} | — | March 10, 2008 | Mount Lemmon | Mount Lemmon Survey | · | 1.2 km | MPC · JPL |
| 622948 | 2015 BP_{304} | — | January 19, 2015 | Haleakala | Pan-STARRS 1 | H | 320 m | MPC · JPL |
| 622949 | 2015 BO_{318} | — | January 17, 2015 | Haleakala | Pan-STARRS 1 | · | 1.1 km | MPC · JPL |
| 622950 | 2015 BA_{321} | — | November 6, 2010 | Mount Lemmon | Mount Lemmon Survey | · | 570 m | MPC · JPL |
| 622951 | 2015 BF_{327} | — | August 17, 2012 | Haleakala | Pan-STARRS 1 | · | 2.5 km | MPC · JPL |
| 622952 | 2015 BR_{332} | — | January 17, 2015 | Haleakala | Pan-STARRS 1 | · | 2.7 km | MPC · JPL |
| 622953 | 2015 BO_{334} | — | January 17, 2015 | Haleakala | Pan-STARRS 1 | · | 790 m | MPC · JPL |
| 622954 | 2015 BC_{342} | — | October 17, 2010 | Mount Lemmon | Mount Lemmon Survey | · | 520 m | MPC · JPL |
| 622955 | 2015 BK_{343} | — | October 3, 2010 | Catalina | CSS | · | 610 m | MPC · JPL |
| 622956 | 2015 BS_{386} | — | January 20, 2015 | Haleakala | Pan-STARRS 1 | · | 970 m | MPC · JPL |
| 622957 | 2015 BF_{426} | — | October 5, 2013 | Haleakala | Pan-STARRS 1 | · | 920 m | MPC · JPL |
| 622958 | 2015 BK_{428} | — | April 4, 2008 | Mount Lemmon | Mount Lemmon Survey | · | 1.3 km | MPC · JPL |
| 622959 | 2015 BO_{428} | — | January 20, 2015 | Haleakala | Pan-STARRS 1 | NYS | 850 m | MPC · JPL |
| 622960 | 2015 BF_{434} | — | September 18, 2009 | Kitt Peak | Spacewatch | · | 1.0 km | MPC · JPL |
| 622961 | 2015 BO_{436} | — | January 20, 2015 | Haleakala | Pan-STARRS 1 | · | 880 m | MPC · JPL |
| 622962 | 2015 BT_{466} | — | August 18, 2012 | Črni Vrh | Skvarč, J. | · | 3.1 km | MPC · JPL |
| 622963 | 2015 BO_{467} | — | January 28, 2011 | Mount Lemmon | Mount Lemmon Survey | · | 1.0 km | MPC · JPL |
| 622964 | 2015 BS_{471} | — | October 25, 2007 | Mount Lemmon | Mount Lemmon Survey | · | 540 m | MPC · JPL |
| 622965 | 2015 BM_{478} | — | November 8, 2007 | Kitt Peak | Spacewatch | · | 560 m | MPC · JPL |
| 622966 | 2015 BG_{484} | — | January 20, 2015 | Haleakala | Pan-STARRS 1 | · | 570 m | MPC · JPL |
| 622967 | 2015 BP_{535} | — | January 18, 2015 | Haleakala | Pan-STARRS 1 | · | 940 m | MPC · JPL |
| 622968 | 2015 BB_{558} | — | September 14, 2013 | Haleakala | Pan-STARRS 1 | · | 2.4 km | MPC · JPL |
| 622969 | 2015 BB_{568} | — | January 15, 2015 | Haleakala | Pan-STARRS 1 | PHO | 730 m | MPC · JPL |
| 622970 | 2015 BZ_{569} | — | January 28, 2015 | Haleakala | Pan-STARRS 1 | PHO | 700 m | MPC · JPL |
| 622971 | 2015 CH_{7} | — | January 20, 2015 | Haleakala | Pan-STARRS 1 | · | 1.0 km | MPC · JPL |
| 622972 | 2015 CR_{17} | — | February 11, 2004 | Palomar | NEAT | ERI | 1.7 km | MPC · JPL |
| 622973 | 2015 CZ_{21} | — | April 14, 2008 | Mount Lemmon | Mount Lemmon Survey | · | 890 m | MPC · JPL |
| 622974 | 2015 CB_{26} | — | January 17, 2007 | Kitt Peak | Spacewatch | · | 1.1 km | MPC · JPL |
| 622975 | 2015 CO_{43} | — | February 15, 2015 | Haleakala | Pan-STARRS 1 | NYS | 690 m | MPC · JPL |
| 622976 | 2015 CG_{45} | — | February 12, 2000 | Apache Point | SDSS Collaboration | · | 1.0 km | MPC · JPL |
| 622977 | 2015 CQ_{64} | — | May 12, 2012 | Haleakala | Pan-STARRS 1 | NYS | 820 m | MPC · JPL |
| 622978 | 2015 CV_{69} | — | January 19, 2015 | Mount Lemmon | Mount Lemmon Survey | · | 3.4 km | MPC · JPL |
| 622979 | 2015 CW_{69} | — | August 14, 2013 | Haleakala | Pan-STARRS 1 | V | 490 m | MPC · JPL |
| 622980 | 2015 CK_{70} | — | February 15, 2015 | Haleakala | Pan-STARRS 1 | PHO | 590 m | MPC · JPL |
| 622981 | 2015 DR_{2} | — | February 11, 2008 | Mount Lemmon | Mount Lemmon Survey | · | 1.1 km | MPC · JPL |
| 622982 | 2015 DH_{5} | — | December 18, 2014 | Haleakala | Pan-STARRS 1 | · | 2.5 km | MPC · JPL |
| 622983 | 2015 DB_{28} | — | January 27, 2015 | Haleakala | Pan-STARRS 1 | · | 970 m | MPC · JPL |
| 622984 | 2015 DT_{50} | — | February 16, 2015 | Haleakala | Pan-STARRS 1 | · | 810 m | MPC · JPL |
| 622985 | 2015 DM_{62} | — | September 14, 2009 | Kitt Peak | Spacewatch | · | 1.3 km | MPC · JPL |
| 622986 | 2015 DG_{72} | — | May 13, 2004 | Kitt Peak | Spacewatch | · | 820 m | MPC · JPL |
| 622987 | 2015 DE_{99} | — | October 27, 2005 | Kitt Peak | Spacewatch | MAS | 690 m | MPC · JPL |
| 622988 | 2015 DD_{192} | — | February 20, 2015 | Haleakala | Pan-STARRS 1 | H | 260 m | MPC · JPL |
| 622989 | 2015 DE_{209} | — | November 27, 2013 | Haleakala | Pan-STARRS 1 | V | 630 m | MPC · JPL |
| 622990 | 2015 DY_{232} | — | February 7, 2011 | Mount Lemmon | Mount Lemmon Survey | · | 710 m | MPC · JPL |
| 622991 | 2015 DX_{239} | — | October 30, 2007 | Kitt Peak | Spacewatch | · | 2.4 km | MPC · JPL |
| 622992 | 2015 DN_{243} | — | February 20, 2015 | Haleakala | Pan-STARRS 1 | · | 950 m | MPC · JPL |
| 622993 | 2015 DN_{247} | — | March 4, 2011 | Mount Lemmon | Mount Lemmon Survey | · | 880 m | MPC · JPL |
| 622994 | 2015 EY_{1} | — | January 23, 2011 | Mount Lemmon | Mount Lemmon Survey | · | 1.0 km | MPC · JPL |
| 622995 | 2015 EM_{5} | — | January 23, 2015 | Haleakala | Pan-STARRS 1 | · | 900 m | MPC · JPL |
| 622996 | 2015 ED_{23} | — | January 27, 2011 | Mount Lemmon | Mount Lemmon Survey | NYS | 880 m | MPC · JPL |
| 622997 | 2015 EX_{37} | — | April 15, 2008 | Kitt Peak | Spacewatch | · | 980 m | MPC · JPL |
| 622998 | 2015 EM_{52} | — | February 20, 2015 | Haleakala | Pan-STARRS 1 | · | 900 m | MPC · JPL |
| 622999 | 2015 EF_{61} | — | March 15, 2015 | Haleakala | Pan-STARRS 1 | · | 1.1 km | MPC · JPL |
| 623000 | 2015 EQ_{74} | — | December 11, 2013 | Haleakala | Pan-STARRS 1 | · | 1.2 km | MPC · JPL |

back to top

== Meaning of names ==
As minor planet discoveries are confirmed, they are given a permanent number by the IAU's Minor Planet Center (MPC), and the discoverers can then submit names for them, following the IAU's naming conventions. The list below concerns those minor planets in the specified number-range that have received names, and explains the meanings of those names.

Official naming citations of newly named small Solar System bodies are approved and published in a bulletin by IAU's Working Group for Small Bodies Nomenclature (WGSBN). Before May 2021, citations were published in MPC's Minor Planet Circulars for many decades. Recent citations can also be found on the JPL Small-Body Database (SBDB). Until his death in 2016, German astronomer Lutz D. Schmadel compiled these citations into the Dictionary of Minor Planet Names (DMP) and regularly updated the collection.

Based on Paul Herget's The Names of the Minor Planets, Schmadel also researched the unclear origin of numerous asteroids, most of which had been named prior to World War II. This article incorporates text from this source, which is in the public domain: SBDB New namings may only be added to this list below after official publication as the preannouncement of names is condemned. The WGSBN publishes a comprehensive guideline for the naming rules of non-cometary small Solar System bodies.

| Named minor planet | Provisional | This minor planet was named for... | Ref · Catalog |
|---|---|---|---|
| 622006 Vákárlajos | 2011 VB_{3} | Lajos Vákár (1910–1993), a Hungarian-Romanian ice hockey player and coach. | IAU · 622006 |
| 622398 Fraser | 2013 TF_{19} | Elizabeth Davidson Fraser (born 1963), a Scottish musician | IAU · 622398 |
| 622467 Ignés | 2013 YX_{22} | Magí Ignés Ortigues (1798–1872), the first discoverer's great-great-grandfather. | IAU · 622467 |
| 622577 Mioriţa | 2014 LU_{14} | Mioriţa, a unique Romanian pastoral myth-ballad. | IAU · 622577 |
