= List of minor planets: 659001–660000 =

The following is a partial list of minor planets, running from minor-planet number 659001 through 660000, inclusive. The primary data for this and other partial lists is based on JPL's "Small-Body Orbital Elements" and data available from the Minor Planet Center. Critical list information is also provided by the MPC, unless otherwise specified from Lowell Observatory. A detailed description of the table's columns and additional sources are given on the main page including a complete list of every page in this series, and a statistical break-up on the dynamical classification of minor planets.

Also see the summary list of all named bodies in numerical and alphabetical order, and the corresponding naming citations for the number range of this particular list. New namings may only be added to this list after official publication, as the preannouncement of names is condemned by the Working Group for Small Bodies Nomenclature of the International Astronomical Union.

Near-Earth obj.	MBA (inner)	MBA (outer)	Centaur
Mars-crosser	MBA (middle)	Jupiter trojan	Trans-Neptunian obj.
Unclassified

== 659001–659100 ==
Designation			Discovery			Properties		Ref
Permanent	Provisional	Named after	Date	Site	Discoverer(s)	Category	Diam.	Ref
659001	2018 LU_{30}	—	June 13, 2018	Mount Lemmon	Mount Lemmon Survey	·	1.4 km	MPC · JPL
659002	2018 LM_{32}	—	June 15, 2018	Haleakala	Pan-STARRS 1	·	750 m	MPC · JPL
659003	2018 MO_{18}	—	June 19, 2018	Haleakala	Pan-STARRS 1	·	630 m	MPC · JPL
659004	2018 MQ_{18}	—	June 17, 2018	Haleakala	Pan-STARRS 1	·	710 m	MPC · JPL
659005	2018 MM_{19}	—	June 21, 2018	Haleakala	Pan-STARRS 1	V	440 m	MPC · JPL
659006	2018 MK_{20}	—	April 25, 2014	Cerro Tololo	DECam	·	560 m	MPC · JPL
659007	2018 NK_{5}	—	December 22, 2008	Mount Lemmon	Mount Lemmon Survey	MAR	860 m	MPC · JPL
659008	2018 NQ_{9}	—	March 4, 2011	Mount Lemmon	Mount Lemmon Survey	EOS	1.7 km	MPC · JPL
659009	2018 NX_{21}	—	July 10, 2018	Haleakala	Pan-STARRS 1	·	1.2 km	MPC · JPL
659010	2018 NO_{24}	—	July 10, 2018	Haleakala	Pan-STARRS 1	V	520 m	MPC · JPL
659011	2018 NW_{24}	—	July 12, 2018	Haleakala	Pan-STARRS 1	L4	6.3 km	MPC · JPL
659012	2018 NR_{26}	—	July 8, 2018	Haleakala	Pan-STARRS 1	L4	6.3 km	MPC · JPL
659013	2018 NB_{28}	—	April 24, 2014	Cerro Tololo-DECam	DECam	L4	5.8 km	MPC · JPL
659014	2018 NZ_{38}	—	December 4, 2010	Mount Lemmon	Mount Lemmon Survey	L4	6.0 km	MPC · JPL
659015	2018 NJ_{69}	—	March 10, 2005	Mount Lemmon	Mount Lemmon Survey	·	1.0 km	MPC · JPL
659016	2018 PH_{1}	—	June 19, 2014	Haleakala	Pan-STARRS 1	·	820 m	MPC · JPL
659017	2018 PQ_{1}	—	April 28, 2014	Cerro Tololo	DECam	V	520 m	MPC · JPL
659018	2018 PA_{3}	—	February 13, 2002	Apache Point	SDSS Collaboration	·	1.0 km	MPC · JPL
659019	2018 PU_{4}	—	January 17, 2013	Kitt Peak	Spacewatch	·	950 m	MPC · JPL
659020	2018 PP_{11}	—	April 18, 2015	Cerro Tololo-DECam	DECam	L4	6.3 km	MPC · JPL
659021	2018 PU_{36}	—	August 17, 2013	Haleakala	Pan-STARRS 1	·	1.8 km	MPC · JPL
659022	2018 PG_{43}	—	August 5, 2018	Haleakala	Pan-STARRS 1	L4	6.9 km	MPC · JPL
659023	2018 PK_{43}	—	August 11, 2018	Haleakala	Pan-STARRS 1	·	1.0 km	MPC · JPL
659024	2018 PN_{43}	—	March 28, 2016	Cerro Tololo-DECam	DECam	·	1.3 km	MPC · JPL
659025	2018 PT_{43}	—	March 13, 2013	Mount Lemmon	Mount Lemmon Survey	·	870 m	MPC · JPL
659026	2018 PU_{43}	—	August 11, 2018	Haleakala	Pan-STARRS 1	EUN	890 m	MPC · JPL
659027	2018 PV_{43}	—	August 12, 2018	Haleakala	Pan-STARRS 1	PHO	800 m	MPC · JPL
659028	2018 PX_{43}	—	August 5, 2018	Haleakala	Pan-STARRS 1	(5)	960 m	MPC · JPL
659029	2018 PZ_{43}	—	August 13, 2018	Haleakala	Pan-STARRS 1	·	990 m	MPC · JPL
659030	2018 PX_{47}	—	July 12, 2018	Haleakala	Pan-STARRS 1	·	1.1 km	MPC · JPL
659031	2018 PB_{55}	—	August 5, 2018	Haleakala	Pan-STARRS 1	·	1.3 km	MPC · JPL
659032	2018 PK_{55}	—	August 11, 2018	Haleakala	Pan-STARRS 1	·	940 m	MPC · JPL
659033	2018 PR_{55}	—	August 8, 2018	Haleakala	Pan-STARRS 1	MAR	720 m	MPC · JPL
659034	2018 PS_{55}	—	August 13, 2018	Haleakala	Pan-STARRS 1	EUN	920 m	MPC · JPL
659035	2018 PO_{60}	—	August 13, 2018	Haleakala	Pan-STARRS 1	·	1.1 km	MPC · JPL
659036	2018 PP_{62}	—	August 12, 2018	Haleakala	Pan-STARRS 1	·	1.1 km	MPC · JPL
659037	2018 PW_{64}	—	August 14, 2018	Haleakala	Pan-STARRS 1	·	970 m	MPC · JPL
659038	2018 QB_{3}	—	October 7, 2005	Mount Lemmon	Mount Lemmon Survey	·	1.3 km	MPC · JPL
659039	2018 QH_{3}	—	October 8, 2005	Kitt Peak	Spacewatch	·	1.2 km	MPC · JPL
659040	2018 QB_{4}	—	February 27, 2006	Kitt Peak	Spacewatch	CLA	1.2 km	MPC · JPL
659041	2018 QY_{11}	—	August 18, 2018	Haleakala	Pan-STARRS 1	(18466)	1.5 km	MPC · JPL
659042	2018 QG_{12}	—	August 22, 2018	Haleakala	Pan-STARRS 1	·	1.8 km	MPC · JPL
659043	2018 QW_{14}	—	August 21, 2018	Haleakala	Pan-STARRS 1	·	1.8 km	MPC · JPL
659044	2018 RF_{4}	—	September 17, 2009	Catalina	CSS	·	1.5 km	MPC · JPL
659045	2018 RA_{12}	—	September 8, 2018	XuYi	PMO NEO Survey Program	MAR	1.0 km	MPC · JPL
659046	2018 RX_{13}	—	July 25, 2001	Lake Tekapo	I. P. Griffin, Brady, N.	·	2.4 km	MPC · JPL
659047	2018 RS_{15}	—	February 20, 2009	Kitt Peak	Spacewatch	·	1.2 km	MPC · JPL
659048	2018 RP_{18}	—	October 23, 2014	Nogales	M. Schwartz, P. R. Holvorcem	·	1.4 km	MPC · JPL
659049	2018 RB_{21}	—	November 17, 2014	Catalina	CSS	·	1.6 km	MPC · JPL
659050	2018 RV_{24}	—	December 5, 2005	Kitt Peak	Spacewatch	MRX	760 m	MPC · JPL
659051	2018 RO_{26}	—	June 30, 2008	Kitt Peak	Spacewatch	·	1.8 km	MPC · JPL
659052	2018 RH_{27}	—	August 25, 2000	Cerro Tololo	Deep Ecliptic Survey	·	1.4 km	MPC · JPL
659053	2018 RH_{28}	—	October 30, 2014	Mount Lemmon	Mount Lemmon Survey	·	2.2 km	MPC · JPL
659054	2018 RK_{31}	—	October 26, 2014	Catalina	CSS	·	1.1 km	MPC · JPL
659055	2018 RU_{31}	—	December 5, 2005	Socorro	LINEAR	·	1.9 km	MPC · JPL
659056	2018 RG_{32}	—	November 20, 2014	Haleakala	Pan-STARRS 1	·	1.3 km	MPC · JPL
659057	2018 RN_{32}	—	September 9, 2018	Mount Lemmon	Mount Lemmon Survey	H	440 m	MPC · JPL
659058	2018 RQ_{32}	—	September 27, 2005	Kitt Peak	Spacewatch	·	1.5 km	MPC · JPL
659059	2018 RF_{34}	—	January 12, 2015	Haleakala	Pan-STARRS 1	·	1.6 km	MPC · JPL
659060	2018 RK_{35}	—	August 30, 2005	Palomar	NEAT	·	2.1 km	MPC · JPL
659061	2018 RL_{35}	—	May 21, 2017	Haleakala	Pan-STARRS 1	·	3.2 km	MPC · JPL
659062	2018 RF_{40}	—	November 25, 2005	Kitt Peak	Spacewatch	·	1.5 km	MPC · JPL
659063	2018 RL_{48}	—	January 5, 2006	Catalina	CSS	·	1.8 km	MPC · JPL
659064	2018 RA_{49}	—	September 9, 2018	Mount Lemmon	Mount Lemmon Survey	·	1.8 km	MPC · JPL
659065	2018 RM_{49}	—	September 12, 2018	Mount Lemmon	Mount Lemmon Survey	·	1.6 km	MPC · JPL
659066	2018 RO_{49}	—	September 11, 2018	Sandlot	G. Hug	·	1.2 km	MPC · JPL
659067	2018 RV_{49}	—	March 29, 2016	Cerro Tololo-DECam	DECam	·	1.3 km	MPC · JPL
659068	2018 RT_{50}	—	March 12, 2016	Haleakala	Pan-STARRS 1	·	1.8 km	MPC · JPL
659069	2018 RT_{51}	—	March 29, 2016	Cerro Tololo-DECam	DECam	·	1.4 km	MPC · JPL
659070	2018 RY_{55}	—	November 13, 2007	Mount Lemmon	Mount Lemmon Survey	·	2.3 km	MPC · JPL
659071	2018 RG_{57}	—	June 27, 2001	Kitt Peak	Spacewatch	·	1.3 km	MPC · JPL
659072	2018 RZ_{58}	—	September 8, 2018	Mount Lemmon	Mount Lemmon Survey	·	1.1 km	MPC · JPL
659073	2018 RL_{61}	—	September 12, 2018	Mount Lemmon	Mount Lemmon Survey	·	1.2 km	MPC · JPL
659074	2018 SU	—	December 1, 2011	Haleakala	Pan-STARRS 1	·	1.1 km	MPC · JPL
659075	2018 SH_{4}	—	January 29, 2016	Mount Lemmon	Mount Lemmon Survey	·	1.9 km	MPC · JPL
659076	2018 SX_{4}	—	July 14, 2013	Haleakala	Pan-STARRS 1	·	1.7 km	MPC · JPL
659077	2018 SJ_{7}	—	November 26, 2014	Haleakala	Pan-STARRS 1	(1547)	1.3 km	MPC · JPL
659078	2018 SQ_{7}	—	April 18, 2009	Kitt Peak	Spacewatch	·	1.5 km	MPC · JPL
659079	2018 SA_{8}	—	September 29, 2005	Kitt Peak	Spacewatch	·	1.6 km	MPC · JPL
659080	2018 SE_{8}	—	January 29, 2011	Mount Lemmon	Mount Lemmon Survey	·	1.3 km	MPC · JPL
659081	2018 ST_{9}	—	January 14, 2016	Haleakala	Pan-STARRS 1	·	2.0 km	MPC · JPL
659082	2018 SD_{10}	—	March 7, 2017	Mount Lemmon	Mount Lemmon Survey	·	1.2 km	MPC · JPL
659083	2018 SM_{10}	—	April 20, 2017	Haleakala	Pan-STARRS 1	EUN	1.1 km	MPC · JPL
659084	2018 SB_{16}	—	September 19, 2009	Catalina	CSS	·	1.1 km	MPC · JPL
659085	2018 SZ_{17}	—	September 11, 2018	Mount Lemmon	Mount Lemmon Survey	MAR	840 m	MPC · JPL
659086	2018 SP_{18}	—	September 19, 2018	Haleakala	Pan-STARRS 2	·	1.5 km	MPC · JPL
659087	2018 SH_{20}	—	March 28, 2016	Cerro Tololo-DECam	DECam	·	1.7 km	MPC · JPL
659088	2018 TL_{8}	—	October 27, 2005	Catalina	CSS	JUN	750 m	MPC · JPL
659089	2018 TH_{9}	—	July 9, 2013	Haleakala	Pan-STARRS 1	HNS	1.2 km	MPC · JPL
659090	2018 TV_{9}	—	September 25, 2009	Mount Lemmon	Mount Lemmon Survey	·	1.3 km	MPC · JPL
659091	2018 TW_{11}	—	November 4, 1999	Socorro	LINEAR	MAS	830 m	MPC · JPL
659092	2018 TW_{16}	—	March 31, 2016	Haleakala	Pan-STARRS 1	·	1.8 km	MPC · JPL
659093	2018 TC_{26}	—	March 28, 2016	Cerro Tololo-DECam	DECam	·	1.8 km	MPC · JPL
659094	2018 TD_{26}	—	October 5, 2018	Mount Lemmon	Mount Lemmon Survey	·	1.5 km	MPC · JPL
659095	2018 TN_{26}	—	October 5, 2018	Mount Lemmon	Mount Lemmon Survey	·	1.5 km	MPC · JPL
659096	2018 TX_{26}	—	October 4, 2018	Haleakala	Pan-STARRS 2	·	1.0 km	MPC · JPL
659097	2018 TG_{27}	—	April 1, 2016	Haleakala	Pan-STARRS 1	·	1.1 km	MPC · JPL
659098	2018 TP_{29}	—	October 10, 2018	Haleakala	Pan-STARRS 2	·	1.3 km	MPC · JPL
659099	2018 TR_{31}	—	October 6, 2018	Mount Lemmon	Mount Lemmon Survey	·	1.7 km	MPC · JPL
659100	2018 TB_{34}	—	October 3, 2018	Haleakala	Pan-STARRS 2	·	1.4 km	MPC · JPL

== 659101–659200 ==
back to top

Designation			Discovery			Properties		Ref
Permanent	Provisional	Named after	Date	Site	Discoverer(s)	Category	Diam.	Ref
659101	2018 TH_{36}	—	September 20, 2009	Mount Lemmon	Mount Lemmon Survey	·	1.2 km	MPC · JPL
659102	2018 TA_{39}	—	March 28, 2016	Cerro Tololo-DECam	DECam	·	1.2 km	MPC · JPL
659103	2018 TF_{40}	—	March 28, 2016	Cerro Tololo-DECam	DECam	·	940 m	MPC · JPL
659104	2018 TV_{40}	—	January 16, 2015	Haleakala	Pan-STARRS 1	·	1.3 km	MPC · JPL
659105	2018 TV_{43}	—	October 10, 2018	Mount Lemmon	Mount Lemmon Survey	·	1.1 km	MPC · JPL
659106	2018 TB_{49}	—	September 26, 2014	Catalina	CSS	·	1.1 km	MPC · JPL
659107	2018 TS_{49}	—	July 24, 2012	Siding Spring	SSS	·	2.3 km	MPC · JPL
659108	2018 UU_{2}	—	July 24, 2015	Haleakala	Pan-STARRS 1	H	420 m	MPC · JPL
659109	2018 UX_{2}	—	November 28, 2006	Mount Lemmon	Mount Lemmon Survey	H	460 m	MPC · JPL
659110	2018 UN_{4}	—	December 26, 2014	Haleakala	Pan-STARRS 1	·	1.8 km	MPC · JPL
659111	2018 UV_{4}	—	January 25, 2006	Kitt Peak	Spacewatch	GEF	1.1 km	MPC · JPL
659112	2018 UO_{5}	—	November 20, 2014	Catalina	CSS	·	1.2 km	MPC · JPL
659113	2018 UF_{6}	—	August 12, 2013	Haleakala	Pan-STARRS 1	·	1.6 km	MPC · JPL
659114	2018 UN_{7}	—	September 10, 2004	Kitt Peak	Spacewatch	·	1.6 km	MPC · JPL
659115	2018 UE_{9}	—	October 18, 2003	Apache Point	SDSS Collaboration	BRA	1.1 km	MPC · JPL
659116	2018 UZ_{11}	—	September 26, 2007	Mount Lemmon	Mount Lemmon Survey	·	3.1 km	MPC · JPL
659117	2018 UC_{13}	—	December 27, 2014	Mount Lemmon	Mount Lemmon Survey	·	1.5 km	MPC · JPL
659118	2018 UQ_{13}	—	September 14, 2004	Palomar	NEAT	·	1.6 km	MPC · JPL
659119	2018 UD_{14}	—	October 10, 2007	Catalina	CSS	T_{j} (2.97)	3.3 km	MPC · JPL
659120	2018 UZ_{17}	—	November 11, 2005	Kitt Peak	Spacewatch	·	1.4 km	MPC · JPL
659121	2018 UQ_{18}	—	March 13, 2016	Haleakala	Pan-STARRS 1	·	2.6 km	MPC · JPL
659122	2018 UH_{26}	—	October 16, 2018	Haleakala	Pan-STARRS 2	·	1.4 km	MPC · JPL
659123	2018 UJ_{26}	—	October 16, 2018	Haleakala	Pan-STARRS 2	·	1.7 km	MPC · JPL
659124	2018 UO_{28}	—	October 16, 2018	Haleakala	Pan-STARRS 2	·	1.9 km	MPC · JPL
659125	2018 US_{28}	—	October 16, 2018	Haleakala	Pan-STARRS 2	·	980 m	MPC · JPL
659126	2018 UU_{29}	—	October 17, 2018	Haleakala	Pan-STARRS 2	·	1.1 km	MPC · JPL
659127	2018 UB_{36}	—	October 17, 2018	Haleakala	Pan-STARRS 2	·	1.4 km	MPC · JPL
659128	2018 US_{36}	—	October 22, 2018	Haleakala	Pan-STARRS 2	·	880 m	MPC · JPL
659129	2018 UH_{38}	—	October 17, 2018	Haleakala	Pan-STARRS 2	EUN	890 m	MPC · JPL
659130	2018 VZ_{10}	—	September 13, 2005	Kitt Peak	Spacewatch	·	2.0 km	MPC · JPL
659131	2018 VM_{11}	—	October 2, 2013	Haleakala	Pan-STARRS 1	·	1.2 km	MPC · JPL
659132	2018 VP_{13}	—	August 30, 2005	Campo Imperatore	CINEOS	·	1.6 km	MPC · JPL
659133	2018 VS_{15}	—	November 17, 2006	Mount Lemmon	Mount Lemmon Survey	·	1.7 km	MPC · JPL
659134	2018 VX_{15}	—	November 26, 2014	Mount Lemmon	Mount Lemmon Survey	·	1.5 km	MPC · JPL
659135	2018 VM_{18}	—	October 9, 2013	Catalina	CSS	·	1.7 km	MPC · JPL
659136	2018 VA_{19}	—	January 23, 2006	Catalina	CSS	·	1.5 km	MPC · JPL
659137	2018 VD_{19}	—	April 27, 2012	Haleakala	Pan-STARRS 1	HNS	1.2 km	MPC · JPL
659138	2018 VP_{19}	—	April 18, 2009	Kitt Peak	Spacewatch	·	1.1 km	MPC · JPL
659139	2018 VW_{19}	—	November 30, 2005	Kitt Peak	Spacewatch	·	1.6 km	MPC · JPL
659140	2018 VJ_{21}	—	November 30, 2014	Catalina	CSS	HNS	1.4 km	MPC · JPL
659141	2018 VD_{22}	—	November 6, 1996	Kitt Peak	Spacewatch	·	1.3 km	MPC · JPL
659142	2018 VB_{23}	—	September 2, 2005	Palomar	NEAT	HNS	1.5 km	MPC · JPL
659143	2018 VF_{23}	—	February 10, 2008	Mount Lemmon	Mount Lemmon Survey	MAR	1.1 km	MPC · JPL
659144	2018 VJ_{24}	—	December 30, 2014	Mount Lemmon	Mount Lemmon Survey	·	1.4 km	MPC · JPL
659145	2018 VK_{24}	—	December 19, 2003	Kitt Peak	Spacewatch	·	2.0 km	MPC · JPL
659146	2018 VL_{24}	—	October 5, 2005	Catalina	CSS	·	1.7 km	MPC · JPL
659147	2018 VW_{24}	—	February 25, 2012	Mount Lemmon	Mount Lemmon Survey	EUN	1.2 km	MPC · JPL
659148	2018 VY_{24}	—	May 12, 2012	Haleakala	Pan-STARRS 1	HNS	1.3 km	MPC · JPL
659149	2018 VB_{26}	—	April 25, 2017	Haleakala	Pan-STARRS 1	EUN	1.2 km	MPC · JPL
659150	2018 VU_{28}	—	October 2, 2008	Mount Lemmon	Mount Lemmon Survey	·	1.3 km	MPC · JPL
659151	2018 VY_{28}	—	October 4, 1997	Kitt Peak	Spacewatch	·	1.3 km	MPC · JPL
659152	2018 VT_{29}	—	September 1, 2005	Palomar	NEAT	MAR	1.0 km	MPC · JPL
659153	2018 VX_{29}	—	November 4, 2018	Palomar	Zwicky Transient Facility	BRA	1.5 km	MPC · JPL
659154	2018 VY_{29}	—	December 23, 2013	Haleakala	Pan-STARRS 1	H	570 m	MPC · JPL
659155	2018 VV_{31}	—	March 22, 2012	Mount Lemmon	Mount Lemmon Survey	·	1.4 km	MPC · JPL
659156	2018 VY_{32}	—	October 6, 2008	Kitt Peak	Spacewatch	·	1.4 km	MPC · JPL
659157	2018 VX_{35}	—	November 5, 2018	Mount Lemmon	Mount Lemmon Survey	EOS	1.6 km	MPC · JPL
659158	2018 VM_{36}	—	September 25, 2009	Mount Lemmon	Mount Lemmon Survey	·	1.6 km	MPC · JPL
659159	2018 VG_{37}	—	February 10, 2011	Mount Lemmon	Mount Lemmon Survey	·	1.5 km	MPC · JPL
659160	2018 VK_{39}	—	January 24, 2015	Haleakala	Pan-STARRS 1	·	1.3 km	MPC · JPL
659161	2018 VM_{39}	—	November 25, 2005	Kitt Peak	Spacewatch	·	1.5 km	MPC · JPL
659162	2018 VS_{41}	—	October 27, 2009	Mount Lemmon	Mount Lemmon Survey	·	1.7 km	MPC · JPL
659163	2018 VR_{44}	—	November 1, 2014	Mount Lemmon	Mount Lemmon Survey	·	1.1 km	MPC · JPL
659164	2018 VF_{45}	—	January 13, 2015	Haleakala	Pan-STARRS 1	·	1.4 km	MPC · JPL
659165	2018 VM_{45}	—	March 17, 2012	Mount Lemmon	Mount Lemmon Survey	·	1.2 km	MPC · JPL
659166	2018 VD_{46}	—	March 2, 2011	Mount Lemmon	Mount Lemmon Survey	·	1.4 km	MPC · JPL
659167	2018 VA_{47}	—	February 17, 2015	Haleakala	Pan-STARRS 1	·	1.6 km	MPC · JPL
659168	2018 VD_{49}	—	October 15, 2007	Mount Lemmon	Mount Lemmon Survey	EOS	1.6 km	MPC · JPL
659169	2018 VS_{49}	—	September 15, 2013	Haleakala	Pan-STARRS 1	·	1.6 km	MPC · JPL
659170	2018 VS_{51}	—	November 26, 2014	Mount Lemmon	Mount Lemmon Survey	·	1.5 km	MPC · JPL
659171	2018 VX_{51}	—	November 30, 2008	Kitt Peak	Spacewatch	·	1.6 km	MPC · JPL
659172	2018 VZ_{52}	—	October 30, 2002	Kitt Peak	Spacewatch	·	1.7 km	MPC · JPL
659173	2018 VB_{53}	—	December 6, 2005	Kitt Peak	Spacewatch	·	1.4 km	MPC · JPL
659174	2018 VW_{53}	—	August 13, 2013	Kitt Peak	Spacewatch	·	1.3 km	MPC · JPL
659175	2018 VX_{53}	—	August 17, 2009	Kitt Peak	Spacewatch	·	1.1 km	MPC · JPL
659176	2018 VN_{54}	—	September 1, 2013	Haleakala	Pan-STARRS 1	·	1.4 km	MPC · JPL
659177	2018 VD_{56}	—	October 16, 2018	Haleakala	Pan-STARRS 2	·	1.3 km	MPC · JPL
659178	2018 VN_{57}	—	November 26, 2014	Haleakala	Pan-STARRS 1	·	1.2 km	MPC · JPL
659179	2018 VO_{58}	—	January 11, 2015	Haleakala	Pan-STARRS 1	EUN	780 m	MPC · JPL
659180	2018 VT_{59}	—	November 17, 2006	Kitt Peak	Spacewatch	·	1.4 km	MPC · JPL
659181	2018 VX_{59}	—	September 11, 2018	Mount Lemmon	Mount Lemmon Survey	·	1.2 km	MPC · JPL
659182	2018 VQ_{61}	—	July 28, 2005	Palomar	NEAT	·	1.2 km	MPC · JPL
659183	2018 VT_{61}	—	April 19, 2015	Cerro Tololo-DECam	DECam	·	1.9 km	MPC · JPL
659184	2018 VG_{62}	—	July 16, 2013	Haleakala	Pan-STARRS 1	KON	2.4 km	MPC · JPL
659185	2018 VQ_{62}	—	September 21, 2012	Mount Lemmon	Mount Lemmon Survey	HYG	2.2 km	MPC · JPL
659186	2018 VT_{62}	—	September 30, 2005	Mauna Kea	A. Boattini	·	1.5 km	MPC · JPL
659187	2018 VC_{63}	—	November 10, 2005	Mount Lemmon	Mount Lemmon Survey	·	1.5 km	MPC · JPL
659188	2018 VP_{65}	—	October 8, 2004	Kitt Peak	Spacewatch	·	1.6 km	MPC · JPL
659189	2018 VP_{66}	—	January 28, 2006	Catalina	CSS	·	2.9 km	MPC · JPL
659190	2018 VY_{68}	—	October 1, 2013	Mount Lemmon	Mount Lemmon Survey	AGN	1.2 km	MPC · JPL
659191	2018 VZ_{68}	—	October 22, 2009	Mount Lemmon	Mount Lemmon Survey	·	1.9 km	MPC · JPL
659192	2018 VL_{69}	—	September 17, 2013	Mount Lemmon	Mount Lemmon Survey	·	1.6 km	MPC · JPL
659193	2018 VX_{69}	—	November 27, 2013	Haleakala	Pan-STARRS 1	·	2.1 km	MPC · JPL
659194	2018 VA_{70}	—	October 3, 2013	Haleakala	Pan-STARRS 1	·	1.9 km	MPC · JPL
659195	2018 VG_{70}	—	March 13, 2007	Kitt Peak	Spacewatch	·	1.7 km	MPC · JPL
659196	2018 VB_{71}	—	March 13, 2011	Catalina	CSS	DOR	2.7 km	MPC · JPL
659197	2018 VS_{71}	—	September 20, 2009	Mount Lemmon	Mount Lemmon Survey	·	1.7 km	MPC · JPL
659198	2018 VA_{72}	—	April 30, 2012	Mount Lemmon	Mount Lemmon Survey	H	390 m	MPC · JPL
659199	2018 VK_{73}	—	September 13, 2007	Kitt Peak	Spacewatch	·	1.6 km	MPC · JPL
659200	2018 VU_{73}	—	March 28, 2008	Mount Lemmon	Mount Lemmon Survey	(5)	1.3 km	MPC · JPL

== 659201–659300 ==
back to top

Designation			Discovery			Properties		Ref
Permanent	Provisional	Named after	Date	Site	Discoverer(s)	Category	Diam.	Ref
659201	2018 VJ_{75}	—	November 24, 1997	Kitt Peak	Spacewatch	·	1.4 km	MPC · JPL
659202	2018 VZ_{76}	—	November 9, 2013	Haleakala	Pan-STARRS 1	·	1.4 km	MPC · JPL
659203	2018 VD_{77}	—	October 16, 2018	Haleakala	Pan-STARRS 2	·	1.5 km	MPC · JPL
659204	2018 VP_{78}	—	August 29, 2009	Kitt Peak	Spacewatch	·	1.2 km	MPC · JPL
659205	2018 VV_{78}	—	December 29, 2014	Haleakala	Pan-STARRS 1	·	2.3 km	MPC · JPL
659206	2018 VE_{80}	—	September 11, 2004	Kitt Peak	Spacewatch	AEO	1.1 km	MPC · JPL
659207	2018 VF_{80}	—	March 19, 2007	Mount Lemmon	Mount Lemmon Survey	WIT	850 m	MPC · JPL
659208	2018 VG_{80}	—	November 27, 2013	Haleakala	Pan-STARRS 1	EOS	1.4 km	MPC · JPL
659209	2018 VV_{81}	—	November 20, 2009	Kitt Peak	Spacewatch	·	1.7 km	MPC · JPL
659210	2018 VS_{82}	—	April 5, 2011	Mount Lemmon	Mount Lemmon Survey	·	1.7 km	MPC · JPL
659211	2018 VD_{83}	—	May 9, 2007	Mount Lemmon	Mount Lemmon Survey	H	560 m	MPC · JPL
659212	2018 VR_{83}	—	August 23, 2014	Haleakala	Pan-STARRS 1	MAR	720 m	MPC · JPL
659213	2018 VT_{83}	—	October 21, 2009	Catalina	CSS	·	1.4 km	MPC · JPL
659214	2018 VZ_{83}	—	September 5, 2007	Catalina	CSS	·	3.0 km	MPC · JPL
659215	2018 VW_{84}	—	October 9, 2004	Kitt Peak	Spacewatch	·	1.7 km	MPC · JPL
659216	2018 VZ_{87}	—	September 28, 2009	Kitt Peak	Spacewatch	·	1.5 km	MPC · JPL
659217	2018 VJ_{89}	—	October 28, 2008	Kitt Peak	Spacewatch	·	1.5 km	MPC · JPL
659218	2018 VM_{89}	—	March 27, 2016	Mount Lemmon	Mount Lemmon Survey	·	1.5 km	MPC · JPL
659219	2018 VO_{89}	—	January 20, 2015	Haleakala	Pan-STARRS 1	·	1.3 km	MPC · JPL
659220	2018 VU_{90}	—	September 11, 2007	Kitt Peak	Spacewatch	·	1.5 km	MPC · JPL
659221	2018 VE_{94}	—	November 30, 2008	Kitt Peak	Spacewatch	·	1.2 km	MPC · JPL
659222	2018 VE_{98}	—	September 13, 2007	Mount Lemmon	Mount Lemmon Survey	·	960 m	MPC · JPL
659223	2018 VW_{99}	—	January 17, 2007	Palomar	NEAT	(5)	1.3 km	MPC · JPL
659224	2018 VP_{100}	—	October 6, 2005	Mount Lemmon	Mount Lemmon Survey	·	1.5 km	MPC · JPL
659225	2018 VS_{100}	—	August 30, 2005	Kitt Peak	Spacewatch	·	1.2 km	MPC · JPL
659226	2018 VC_{102}	—	September 20, 2008	Mount Lemmon	Mount Lemmon Survey	KOR	950 m	MPC · JPL
659227	2018 VF_{102}	—	May 1, 2016	Cerro Tololo	DECam	·	1.6 km	MPC · JPL
659228	2018 VB_{103}	—	July 15, 2013	Haleakala	Pan-STARRS 1	·	1.2 km	MPC · JPL
659229	2018 VM_{105}	—	March 20, 2007	Mount Lemmon	Mount Lemmon Survey	·	1.3 km	MPC · JPL
659230	2018 VL_{106}	—	October 1, 2009	Mount Lemmon	Mount Lemmon Survey	·	1.5 km	MPC · JPL
659231	2018 VW_{106}	—	September 23, 2008	Mount Lemmon	Mount Lemmon Survey	·	1.3 km	MPC · JPL
659232	2018 VA_{108}	—	April 16, 2007	Mount Lemmon	Mount Lemmon Survey	·	2.2 km	MPC · JPL
659233	2018 VF_{109}	—	November 10, 2013	Mount Lemmon	Mount Lemmon Survey	·	1.6 km	MPC · JPL
659234	2018 VF_{110}	—	October 25, 2009	Kitt Peak	Spacewatch	·	1.4 km	MPC · JPL
659235	2018 VW_{110}	—	October 11, 2007	Kitt Peak	Spacewatch	·	2.6 km	MPC · JPL
659236	2018 VB_{111}	—	April 16, 2016	Haleakala	Pan-STARRS 1	EOS	1.6 km	MPC · JPL
659237	2018 VB_{112}	—	December 31, 2008	Mount Lemmon	Mount Lemmon Survey	·	2.2 km	MPC · JPL
659238	2018 VY_{115}	—	October 23, 2005	Catalina	CSS	·	1.4 km	MPC · JPL
659239	2018 VZ_{117}	—	April 1, 2016	Haleakala	Pan-STARRS 1	·	1.8 km	MPC · JPL
659240	2018 VZ_{119}	—	November 8, 2018	Mount Lemmon	Mount Lemmon Survey	·	2.6 km	MPC · JPL
659241	2018 VN_{122}	—	November 8, 2018	Mount Lemmon	Mount Lemmon Survey	·	1.6 km	MPC · JPL
659242	2018 VP_{122}	—	March 28, 2016	Cerro Tololo-DECam	DECam	·	1.5 km	MPC · JPL
659243	2018 VQ_{122}	—	November 6, 2018	Haleakala	Pan-STARRS 2	·	2.2 km	MPC · JPL
659244	2018 VS_{122}	—	November 9, 2018	Haleakala	Pan-STARRS 2	·	1.8 km	MPC · JPL
659245	2018 VU_{122}	—	November 2, 2018	Haleakala	Pan-STARRS 2	·	1.3 km	MPC · JPL
659246	2018 VG_{123}	—	November 1, 2018	Mount Lemmon	Mount Lemmon Survey	·	1.3 km	MPC · JPL
659247	2018 VP_{123}	—	November 8, 2018	Mount Lemmon	Mount Lemmon Survey	·	1.3 km	MPC · JPL
659248	2018 VD_{124}	—	October 10, 2018	Mount Lemmon	Mount Lemmon Survey	TEL	1.1 km	MPC · JPL
659249	2018 VL_{128}	—	November 6, 2018	Haleakala	Pan-STARRS 2	·	2.8 km	MPC · JPL
659250	2018 VN_{128}	—	March 28, 2016	Cerro Tololo-DECam	DECam	·	1.5 km	MPC · JPL
659251	2018 VW_{130}	—	November 9, 2018	Mount Lemmon	Mount Lemmon Survey	·	1.4 km	MPC · JPL
659252	2018 VS_{138}	—	January 8, 2011	Mount Lemmon	Mount Lemmon Survey	·	1.8 km	MPC · JPL
659253	2018 VK_{139}	—	January 17, 2015	Haleakala	Pan-STARRS 1	·	1.6 km	MPC · JPL
659254	2018 VU_{139}	—	March 4, 2011	Kitt Peak	Spacewatch	·	1.9 km	MPC · JPL
659255	2018 VV_{139}	—	November 3, 2018	Mount Lemmon	Mount Lemmon Survey	·	1.0 km	MPC · JPL
659256	2018 VT_{141}	—	November 8, 2018	Mount Lemmon	Mount Lemmon Survey	·	1.4 km	MPC · JPL
659257	2018 VX_{141}	—	November 10, 2018	Mount Lemmon	Mount Lemmon Survey	·	1.6 km	MPC · JPL
659258	2018 VZ_{141}	—	November 10, 2018	Mount Lemmon	Mount Lemmon Survey	·	1.6 km	MPC · JPL
659259	2018 VA_{142}	—	November 6, 2018	Haleakala	Pan-STARRS 2	·	1.5 km	MPC · JPL
659260	2018 VF_{142}	—	January 29, 2015	Haleakala	Pan-STARRS 1	·	2.3 km	MPC · JPL
659261	2018 VC_{143}	—	November 5, 2018	Haleakala	Pan-STARRS 2	·	1.4 km	MPC · JPL
659262	2018 VP_{144}	—	November 5, 2018	Haleakala	Pan-STARRS 2	·	1.3 km	MPC · JPL
659263	2018 VA_{145}	—	November 2, 2018	Mount Lemmon	Mount Lemmon Survey	·	1.7 km	MPC · JPL
659264	2018 VY_{145}	—	June 4, 2011	Mount Lemmon	Mount Lemmon Survey	·	2.0 km	MPC · JPL
659265	2018 VC_{147}	—	November 2, 2018	Mount Lemmon	Mount Lemmon Survey	·	1.2 km	MPC · JPL
659266	2018 VB_{151}	—	November 9, 2018	Haleakala	Pan-STARRS 2	·	1.5 km	MPC · JPL
659267 Cristianstancu	2018 VV_{162}	Cristianstancu	November 5, 2018	La Palma	EURONEAR	·	1.4 km	MPC · JPL
659268	2018 VQ_{181}	—	November 10, 2018	Haleakala	Pan-STARRS 2	·	2.5 km	MPC · JPL
659269	2018 VX_{183}	—	November 2, 2018	Mount Lemmon	Mount Lemmon Survey	·	1.5 km	MPC · JPL
659270	2018 WA_{5}	—	August 17, 2017	Haleakala	Pan-STARRS 1	·	1.9 km	MPC · JPL
659271	2018 WK_{5}	—	November 19, 2018	Haleakala	Pan-STARRS 2	·	2.2 km	MPC · JPL
659272	2018 WM_{5}	—	November 10, 2018	Mount Lemmon	Mount Lemmon Survey	·	1.8 km	MPC · JPL
659273	2018 WG_{8}	—	November 17, 2018	Mount Lemmon	Mount Lemmon Survey	·	1.9 km	MPC · JPL
659274	2018 WS_{8}	—	December 10, 2018	Mount Lemmon	Mount Lemmon Survey	·	2.3 km	MPC · JPL
659275	2018 XU_{4}	—	April 16, 2017	Haleakala	Pan-STARRS 1	H	510 m	MPC · JPL
659276	2018 XH_{6}	—	December 18, 2001	Socorro	LINEAR	·	3.5 km	MPC · JPL
659277	2018 XX_{7}	—	September 24, 2011	Mount Lemmon	Mount Lemmon Survey	·	2.3 km	MPC · JPL
659278	2018 XJ_{9}	—	October 15, 2001	Palomar	NEAT	TIR	2.9 km	MPC · JPL
659279	2018 XK_{9}	—	January 14, 2015	Haleakala	Pan-STARRS 1	·	2.0 km	MPC · JPL
659280	2018 XH_{10}	—	October 22, 2009	Mount Lemmon	Mount Lemmon Survey	·	1.2 km	MPC · JPL
659281	2018 XM_{11}	—	March 27, 2011	Mount Lemmon	Mount Lemmon Survey	·	1.7 km	MPC · JPL
659282	2018 XT_{14}	—	January 5, 2001	Kitt Peak	Spacewatch	·	2.7 km	MPC · JPL
659283	2018 XA_{15}	—	April 4, 2010	Kitt Peak	Spacewatch	·	2.2 km	MPC · JPL
659284	2018 XF_{15}	—	November 20, 2007	Mount Lemmon	Mount Lemmon Survey	·	2.5 km	MPC · JPL
659285	2018 XH_{15}	—	December 15, 2006	Kitt Peak	Spacewatch	·	1.4 km	MPC · JPL
659286	2018 XK_{16}	—	July 19, 2013	Haleakala	Pan-STARRS 1	EUN	1.3 km	MPC · JPL
659287	2018 XQ_{17}	—	January 14, 2011	Kitt Peak	Spacewatch	·	2.8 km	MPC · JPL
659288	2018 XV_{18}	—	October 29, 2010	Catalina	CSS	H	470 m	MPC · JPL
659289	2018 XE_{19}	—	December 19, 2001	Cima Ekar	ADAS	·	3.1 km	MPC · JPL
659290	2018 XO_{19}	—	December 10, 2018	Mount Lemmon	Mount Lemmon Survey	CLO	1.6 km	MPC · JPL
659291	2018 XP_{19}	—	October 5, 2004	Kitt Peak	Spacewatch	·	1.6 km	MPC · JPL
659292	2018 XR_{20}	—	December 12, 2018	Haleakala	Pan-STARRS 1	BRA	1.2 km	MPC · JPL
659293	2018 XA_{21}	—	September 24, 2008	Mount Lemmon	Mount Lemmon Survey	·	2.0 km	MPC · JPL
659294	2018 XD_{22}	—	October 8, 2007	Catalina	CSS	·	1.4 km	MPC · JPL
659295	2018 XL_{24}	—	January 29, 2014	Kitt Peak	Spacewatch	·	2.4 km	MPC · JPL
659296	2018 XS_{24}	—	December 12, 2018	Haleakala	Pan-STARRS 1	H	370 m	MPC · JPL
659297	2018 XR_{25}	—	December 14, 2018	Haleakala	Pan-STARRS 1	·	2.6 km	MPC · JPL
659298	2018 XZ_{27}	—	December 14, 2018	Mount Lemmon	Mount Lemmon Survey	·	3.1 km	MPC · JPL
659299	2018 XN_{28}	—	December 12, 2018	Haleakala	Pan-STARRS 1	·	1.9 km	MPC · JPL
659300	2018 XW_{29}	—	December 10, 2018	Mount Lemmon	Mount Lemmon Survey	·	2.6 km	MPC · JPL

== 659301–659400 ==
back to top

Designation			Discovery			Properties		Ref
Permanent	Provisional	Named after	Date	Site	Discoverer(s)	Category	Diam.	Ref
659301	2018 XD_{32}	—	December 14, 2018	Haleakala	Pan-STARRS 1	TIR	2.5 km	MPC · JPL
659302	2018 XL_{32}	—	December 10, 2018	Mount Lemmon	Mount Lemmon Survey	·	2.8 km	MPC · JPL
659303	2018 XQ_{35}	—	April 18, 2015	Cerro Tololo-DECam	DECam	·	1.9 km	MPC · JPL
659304	2018 XR_{36}	—	January 20, 2015	Haleakala	Pan-STARRS 1	·	2.1 km	MPC · JPL
659305	2018 XR_{44}	—	November 13, 2002	Palomar	NEAT	·	1.8 km	MPC · JPL
659306	2018 YP	—	September 10, 2007	Catalina	CSS	H	450 m	MPC · JPL
659307	2018 YY_{6}	—	January 2, 2019	Haleakala	Pan-STARRS 1	·	1.8 km	MPC · JPL
659308	2018 YL_{8}	—	December 18, 2018	Haleakala	Pan-STARRS 1	H	410 m	MPC · JPL
659309	2018 YL_{12}	—	December 31, 2018	Haleakala	Pan-STARRS 1	EOS	1.5 km	MPC · JPL
659310	2018 YN_{12}	—	April 18, 2015	Cerro Tololo-DECam	DECam	NAE	1.8 km	MPC · JPL
659311	2019 AE	—	February 21, 2007	Catalina	CSS	·	2.5 km	MPC · JPL
659312	2019 AE_{12}	—	February 19, 2009	Kitt Peak	Spacewatch	H	340 m	MPC · JPL
659313	2019 AH_{15}	—	September 16, 2009	Mount Lemmon	Mount Lemmon Survey	·	1.7 km	MPC · JPL
659314	2019 AK_{15}	—	August 22, 2006	Palomar	NEAT	THB	3.6 km	MPC · JPL
659315	2019 AB_{16}	—	November 7, 2012	Haleakala	Pan-STARRS 1	·	1.6 km	MPC · JPL
659316	2019 AX_{16}	—	September 26, 2011	Haleakala	Pan-STARRS 1	·	2.8 km	MPC · JPL
659317	2019 AF_{17}	—	August 9, 2016	Haleakala	Pan-STARRS 1	·	2.7 km	MPC · JPL
659318	2019 AV_{18}	—	April 18, 2015	Cerro Tololo-DECam	DECam	EOS	1.6 km	MPC · JPL
659319	2019 AX_{18}	—	October 22, 2006	Kitt Peak	Spacewatch	·	2.2 km	MPC · JPL
659320	2019 AD_{19}	—	March 15, 2008	Mount Lemmon	Mount Lemmon Survey	T_{j} (2.98)	2.8 km	MPC · JPL
659321	2019 AH_{19}	—	November 20, 2001	Socorro	LINEAR	EUP	3.2 km	MPC · JPL
659322	2019 AO_{19}	—	February 10, 2008	Kitt Peak	Spacewatch	·	3.0 km	MPC · JPL
659323	2019 AY_{19}	—	April 15, 2004	Apache Point	SDSS Collaboration	H	470 m	MPC · JPL
659324	2019 AZ_{20}	—	April 4, 2003	Kitt Peak	Spacewatch	·	2.8 km	MPC · JPL
659325	2019 AE_{21}	—	November 2, 2007	Kitt Peak	Spacewatch	·	1.7 km	MPC · JPL
659326	2019 AG_{22}	—	February 24, 2014	Haleakala	Pan-STARRS 1	·	1.7 km	MPC · JPL
659327	2019 AL_{22}	—	May 15, 2016	Haleakala	Pan-STARRS 1	GAL	1.5 km	MPC · JPL
659328	2019 AG_{26}	—	April 7, 2014	Mount Lemmon	Mount Lemmon Survey	(895)	3.8 km	MPC · JPL
659329	2019 AL_{26}	—	October 16, 2007	Catalina	CSS	H	570 m	MPC · JPL
659330	2019 AU_{26}	—	September 17, 2006	Kitt Peak	Spacewatch	·	1.8 km	MPC · JPL
659331	2019 AZ_{26}	—	August 1, 2016	Haleakala	Pan-STARRS 1	·	2.8 km	MPC · JPL
659332	2019 AG_{28}	—	February 26, 2014	Mount Lemmon	Mount Lemmon Survey	·	2.7 km	MPC · JPL
659333	2019 AL_{28}	—	February 19, 2014	Mount Lemmon	Mount Lemmon Survey	·	1.7 km	MPC · JPL
659334	2019 AX_{28}	—	October 21, 2012	Mount Lemmon	Mount Lemmon Survey	H	620 m	MPC · JPL
659335	2019 AY_{28}	—	May 1, 2003	Kitt Peak	Spacewatch	EUP	2.4 km	MPC · JPL
659336	2019 AE_{30}	—	September 17, 2017	Haleakala	Pan-STARRS 1	EUP	3.0 km	MPC · JPL
659337	2019 AU_{30}	—	January 23, 2006	Kitt Peak	Spacewatch	H	390 m	MPC · JPL
659338	2019 AH_{31}	—	November 1, 2007	Kitt Peak	Spacewatch	·	2.9 km	MPC · JPL
659339	2019 AM_{31}	—	November 18, 2003	Kitt Peak	Spacewatch	BRA	1.1 km	MPC · JPL
659340	2019 AZ_{31}	—	September 23, 2017	Haleakala	Pan-STARRS 1	·	2.5 km	MPC · JPL
659341	2019 AK_{32}	—	September 19, 2017	Haleakala	Pan-STARRS 1	·	3.0 km	MPC · JPL
659342	2019 AB_{33}	—	November 13, 1996	Kitt Peak	Spacewatch	·	1.5 km	MPC · JPL
659343	2019 AB_{34}	—	October 2, 2008	Catalina	CSS	·	1.8 km	MPC · JPL
659344	2019 AD_{34}	—	January 16, 2009	Mount Lemmon	Mount Lemmon Survey	·	660 m	MPC · JPL
659345	2019 AF_{35}	—	October 22, 2012	Haleakala	Pan-STARRS 1	·	1.9 km	MPC · JPL
659346	2019 AT_{36}	—	July 4, 2016	Haleakala	Pan-STARRS 1	KOR	1.1 km	MPC · JPL
659347	2019 AV_{38}	—	November 4, 2005	Mount Lemmon	Mount Lemmon Survey	·	3.6 km	MPC · JPL
659348	2019 AX_{38}	—	April 13, 2015	Haleakala	Pan-STARRS 1	EOS	1.8 km	MPC · JPL
659349	2019 AA_{39}	—	October 12, 2005	Kitt Peak	Spacewatch	·	2.5 km	MPC · JPL
659350	2019 AH_{39}	—	May 10, 2015	Mount Lemmon	Mount Lemmon Survey	·	1.4 km	MPC · JPL
659351	2019 AO_{39}	—	January 12, 2008	Kitt Peak	Spacewatch	·	2.7 km	MPC · JPL
659352	2019 AZ_{39}	—	January 19, 2012	Haleakala	Pan-STARRS 1	·	1.1 km	MPC · JPL
659353	2019 AA_{40}	—	August 31, 2017	Mount Lemmon	Mount Lemmon Survey	·	1.8 km	MPC · JPL
659354	2019 AB_{40}	—	December 14, 2007	Mount Lemmon	Mount Lemmon Survey	H	470 m	MPC · JPL
659355	2019 AE_{42}	—	April 18, 2015	Cerro Tololo-DECam	DECam	KOR	1.0 km	MPC · JPL
659356	2019 AU_{42}	—	December 20, 2007	Kitt Peak	Spacewatch	EOS	1.6 km	MPC · JPL
659357	2019 AV_{42}	—	September 8, 1999	Kitt Peak	Spacewatch	·	1.7 km	MPC · JPL
659358	2019 AF_{43}	—	November 20, 2007	Kitt Peak	Spacewatch	EOS	1.4 km	MPC · JPL
659359	2019 AW_{43}	—	February 18, 2015	Haleakala	Pan-STARRS 1	KOR	1.2 km	MPC · JPL
659360	2019 AZ_{43}	—	January 23, 2003	Kitt Peak	Spacewatch	·	2.2 km	MPC · JPL
659361	2019 AA_{44}	—	April 1, 2003	Apache Point	SDSS Collaboration	LIX	3.4 km	MPC · JPL
659362	2019 AF_{44}	—	July 4, 2016	Haleakala	Pan-STARRS 1	·	2.9 km	MPC · JPL
659363	2019 AU_{45}	—	February 10, 2013	Haleakala	Pan-STARRS 1	·	2.7 km	MPC · JPL
659364	2019 AZ_{45}	—	August 19, 2006	Kitt Peak	Spacewatch	EOS	1.6 km	MPC · JPL
659365	2019 AV_{47}	—	January 9, 2002	Kitt Peak	Spacewatch	VER	2.2 km	MPC · JPL
659366	2019 AF_{48}	—	February 10, 2014	Mount Lemmon	Mount Lemmon Survey	·	1.4 km	MPC · JPL
659367	2019 AK_{48}	—	October 26, 1995	Kitt Peak	Spacewatch	·	1.2 km	MPC · JPL
659368	2019 AQ_{50}	—	March 10, 2008	Mount Lemmon	Mount Lemmon Survey	·	2.5 km	MPC · JPL
659369	2019 AC_{54}	—	March 26, 2014	Mount Lemmon	Mount Lemmon Survey	·	2.2 km	MPC · JPL
659370	2019 AU_{54}	—	January 4, 2019	Mount Lemmon	Mount Lemmon Survey	THM	1.8 km	MPC · JPL
659371	2019 AY_{54}	—	January 2, 2019	Haleakala	Pan-STARRS 1	H	440 m	MPC · JPL
659372	2019 AD_{55}	—	January 7, 2019	Haleakala	Pan-STARRS 1	·	1.8 km	MPC · JPL
659373	2019 AR_{55}	—	May 20, 2015	Cerro Tololo	DECam	·	1.8 km	MPC · JPL
659374	2019 AS_{55}	—	January 1, 2019	Haleakala	Pan-STARRS 1	H	440 m	MPC · JPL
659375	2019 AS_{56}	—	January 9, 2019	Haleakala	Pan-STARRS 1	H	400 m	MPC · JPL
659376	2019 AA_{57}	—	January 3, 2019	Haleakala	Pan-STARRS 1	H	420 m	MPC · JPL
659377	2019 AW_{57}	—	August 27, 2008	Mauna Kea	P. A. Wiegert	DOR	1.6 km	MPC · JPL
659378	2019 AW_{58}	—	January 14, 2019	Haleakala	Pan-STARRS 1	·	2.5 km	MPC · JPL
659379	2019 AX_{58}	—	January 9, 2019	Haleakala	Pan-STARRS 1	·	2.6 km	MPC · JPL
659380	2019 AR_{59}	—	January 8, 2019	Haleakala	Pan-STARRS 1	·	2.7 km	MPC · JPL
659381	2019 AW_{59}	—	October 19, 2011	Haleakala	Pan-STARRS 1	·	2.3 km	MPC · JPL
659382	2019 AJ_{64}	—	May 5, 2014	Cerro Tololo	DECam	H	440 m	MPC · JPL
659383	2019 AB_{67}	—	December 11, 2013	Haleakala	Pan-STARRS 1	KOR	1.0 km	MPC · JPL
659384	2019 AE_{67}	—	February 22, 2014	Mount Lemmon	Mount Lemmon Survey	·	2.1 km	MPC · JPL
659385	2019 AX_{68}	—	January 11, 2019	Haleakala	Pan-STARRS 1	·	2.5 km	MPC · JPL
659386	2019 AF_{73}	—	January 1, 2014	Haleakala	Pan-STARRS 1	EOS	2.0 km	MPC · JPL
659387	2019 AN_{79}	—	September 12, 2007	Mount Lemmon	Mount Lemmon Survey	·	1.1 km	MPC · JPL
659388	2019 AM_{81}	—	September 17, 2017	Haleakala	Pan-STARRS 1	LUT	2.8 km	MPC · JPL
659389	2019 AO_{83}	—	January 22, 2002	Kitt Peak	Spacewatch	·	2.1 km	MPC · JPL
659390	2019 AZ_{84}	—	April 29, 2014	Cerro Tololo	DECam	·	2.3 km	MPC · JPL
659391	2019 AA_{93}	—	April 18, 2015	Cerro Tololo-DECam	DECam	·	1.4 km	MPC · JPL
659392	2019 AF_{98}	—	October 27, 2017	Mount Lemmon	Mount Lemmon Survey	EOS	1.5 km	MPC · JPL
659393	2019 AD_{109}	—	October 8, 2012	Mount Lemmon	Mount Lemmon Survey	·	1.5 km	MPC · JPL
659394	2019 AN_{113}	—	November 16, 2017	Mount Lemmon	Mount Lemmon Survey	·	1.6 km	MPC · JPL
659395	2019 AO_{114}	—	September 10, 2007	Mount Lemmon	Mount Lemmon Survey	KOR	1.0 km	MPC · JPL
659396	2019 BC	—	December 31, 2015	Haleakala	Pan-STARRS 1	H	470 m	MPC · JPL
659397	2019 BR	—	February 27, 2006	Mount Lemmon	Mount Lemmon Survey	H	550 m	MPC · JPL
659398	2019 BU	—	May 12, 2014	Mount Lemmon	Mount Lemmon Survey	H	530 m	MPC · JPL
659399	2019 BX	—	January 4, 2019	Mount Lemmon	Mount Lemmon Survey	H	360 m	MPC · JPL
659400	2019 BW_{2}	—	February 25, 2006	Kitt Peak	Spacewatch	H	520 m	MPC · JPL

== 659401–659500 ==
back to top

Designation			Discovery			Properties		Ref
Permanent	Provisional	Named after	Date	Site	Discoverer(s)	Category	Diam.	Ref
659401	2019 BJ_{3}	—	March 6, 2013	Siding Spring	SSS	·	5.1 km	MPC · JPL
659402	2019 BU_{4}	—	June 11, 2012	Haleakala	Pan-STARRS 1	H	430 m	MPC · JPL
659403	2019 BW_{4}	—	June 3, 2008	Mount Lemmon	Mount Lemmon Survey	T_{j} (2.96)	3.1 km	MPC · JPL
659404	2019 BU_{5}	—	October 11, 2012	Piszkéstető	K. Sárneczky	·	2.4 km	MPC · JPL
659405	2019 BB_{6}	—	January 30, 2011	Catalina	CSS	H	440 m	MPC · JPL
659406	2019 BK_{6}	—	December 31, 2013	Kitt Peak	Spacewatch	·	2.0 km	MPC · JPL
659407	2019 BL_{6}	—	December 10, 2006	Kitt Peak	Spacewatch	·	2.7 km	MPC · JPL
659408	2019 BU_{6}	—	October 18, 2012	Mount Lemmon	Mount Lemmon Survey	·	2.2 km	MPC · JPL
659409	2019 BY_{6}	—	July 21, 2006	Mount Lemmon	Mount Lemmon Survey	·	3.6 km	MPC · JPL
659410	2019 BT_{7}	—	December 21, 2008	Catalina	CSS	BRA	1.8 km	MPC · JPL
659411	2019 BU_{7}	—	November 12, 2007	Mount Lemmon	Mount Lemmon Survey	EOS	2.0 km	MPC · JPL
659412	2019 BV_{7}	—	November 24, 2003	Kitt Peak	Spacewatch	·	2.1 km	MPC · JPL
659413	2019 BY_{7}	—	November 7, 2012	Mount Lemmon	Mount Lemmon Survey	·	2.3 km	MPC · JPL
659414	2019 BA_{8}	—	March 23, 2003	Kitt Peak	Spacewatch	·	2.4 km	MPC · JPL
659415	2019 BE_{8}	—	September 27, 2006	Mount Lemmon	Mount Lemmon Survey	·	4.3 km	MPC · JPL
659416	2019 BJ_{9}	—	January 16, 2019	Haleakala	Pan-STARRS 1	EOS	1.4 km	MPC · JPL
659417	2019 BW_{10}	—	January 16, 2019	Haleakala	Pan-STARRS 1	T_{j} (2.99) · EUP	2.7 km	MPC · JPL
659418	2019 BQ_{11}	—	December 13, 2006	Mount Lemmon	Mount Lemmon Survey	LUT	3.7 km	MPC · JPL
659419	2019 CC	—	December 15, 2010	Mount Lemmon	Mount Lemmon Survey	H	570 m	MPC · JPL
659420	2019 CK	—	July 15, 2012	Siding Spring	SSS	H	400 m	MPC · JPL
659421	2019 CM	—	January 7, 2006	Mount Lemmon	Mount Lemmon Survey	H	550 m	MPC · JPL
659422	2019 CG_{2}	—	June 17, 2012	Kitt Peak	Spacewatch	H	590 m	MPC · JPL
659423	2019 CQ_{2}	—	May 30, 2017	Mount Lemmon	Mount Lemmon Survey	H	420 m	MPC · JPL
659424	2019 CR_{3}	—	November 12, 2007	Mount Lemmon	Mount Lemmon Survey	H	640 m	MPC · JPL
659425	2019 CT_{3}	—	December 8, 2015	Haleakala	Pan-STARRS 1	H	470 m	MPC · JPL
659426	2019 CY_{3}	—	April 24, 2011	Haleakala	Pan-STARRS 1	H	480 m	MPC · JPL
659427	2019 CB_{6}	—	November 3, 2007	Kitt Peak	Spacewatch	·	2.3 km	MPC · JPL
659428	2019 CJ_{6}	—	February 13, 2008	Mount Lemmon	Mount Lemmon Survey	LIX	3.3 km	MPC · JPL
659429	2019 CK_{6}	—	March 24, 2009	Mount Lemmon	Mount Lemmon Survey	·	2.9 km	MPC · JPL
659430	2019 CU_{6}	—	September 3, 2005	Mauna Kea	Veillet, C.	·	3.0 km	MPC · JPL
659431	2019 CA_{7}	—	November 30, 2003	Kitt Peak	Spacewatch	NYS	980 m	MPC · JPL
659432	2019 CM_{7}	—	April 7, 2008	Kitt Peak	Spacewatch	·	1.2 km	MPC · JPL
659433	2019 CS_{7}	—	September 12, 2007	Mount Lemmon	Mount Lemmon Survey	(2076)	610 m	MPC · JPL
659434	2019 CW_{9}	—	September 26, 2017	Haleakala	Pan-STARRS 1	·	2.2 km	MPC · JPL
659435	2019 CD_{13}	—	February 4, 2019	Haleakala	Pan-STARRS 1	HYG	2.5 km	MPC · JPL
659436	2019 CU_{13}	—	August 12, 2017	Haleakala	Pan-STARRS 1	H	470 m	MPC · JPL
659437	2019 CA_{14}	—	February 4, 2019	Haleakala	Pan-STARRS 1	·	2.2 km	MPC · JPL
659438	2019 CF_{18}	—	February 8, 2019	Mount Lemmon	Mount Lemmon Survey	·	2.3 km	MPC · JPL
659439	2019 CS_{18}	—	February 12, 2019	Mount Lemmon	Mount Lemmon Survey	·	2.5 km	MPC · JPL
659440	2019 CB_{19}	—	February 4, 2019	Haleakala	Pan-STARRS 1	·	2.0 km	MPC · JPL
659441	2019 CC_{19}	—	February 5, 2019	Haleakala	Pan-STARRS 1	·	2.3 km	MPC · JPL
659442	2019 CD_{24}	—	February 4, 2019	Haleakala	Pan-STARRS 1	TIR	2.3 km	MPC · JPL
659443	2019 CK_{27}	—	July 26, 2011	Haleakala	Pan-STARRS 1	L5	8.7 km	MPC · JPL
659444	2019 DU_{2}	—	October 25, 2005	Kitt Peak	Spacewatch	THM	2.4 km	MPC · JPL
659445	2019 DY_{4}	—	September 22, 2016	Mount Lemmon	Mount Lemmon Survey	EOS	1.6 km	MPC · JPL
659446	2019 EW	—	September 26, 2006	Kitt Peak	Spacewatch	·	1.3 km	MPC · JPL
659447	2019 EV_{1}	—	May 4, 2006	Catalina	CSS	H	550 m	MPC · JPL
659448	2019 EG_{2}	—	March 12, 2003	Palomar	NEAT	·	2.3 km	MPC · JPL
659449	2019 EL_{4}	—	March 9, 2019	Mount Lemmon	Mount Lemmon Survey	·	3.2 km	MPC · JPL
659450	2019 FJ_{2}	—	March 31, 2019	Mount Lemmon	Mount Lemmon Survey	H	400 m	MPC · JPL
659451	2019 FH_{3}	—	February 24, 2006	Catalina	CSS	H	640 m	MPC · JPL
659452	2019 FN_{3}	—	November 19, 2009	Mount Lemmon	Mount Lemmon Survey	·	1.3 km	MPC · JPL
659453	2019 FV_{3}	—	March 8, 1997	Kitt Peak	Spacewatch	EUN	1.4 km	MPC · JPL
659454	2019 FZ_{3}	—	March 11, 1996	Kitt Peak	Spacewatch	·	2.8 km	MPC · JPL
659455	2019 FZ_{4}	—	April 11, 2008	Mount Lemmon	Mount Lemmon Survey	·	2.9 km	MPC · JPL
659456	2019 FL_{5}	—	May 30, 2011	Haleakala	Pan-STARRS 1	·	1.7 km	MPC · JPL
659457	2019 FM_{6}	—	March 15, 2002	Kitt Peak	Spacewatch	·	2.6 km	MPC · JPL
659458	2019 FM_{7}	—	March 11, 2008	Catalina	CSS	H	530 m	MPC · JPL
659459	2019 FT_{8}	—	May 27, 2014	Haleakala	Pan-STARRS 1	·	2.2 km	MPC · JPL
659460	2019 FE_{11}	—	March 29, 2019	Mount Lemmon	Mount Lemmon Survey	·	1.3 km	MPC · JPL
659461	2019 FM_{11}	—	April 29, 2014	Haleakala	Pan-STARRS 1	·	1.4 km	MPC · JPL
659462	2019 FB_{15}	—	March 31, 2019	Mount Lemmon	Mount Lemmon Survey	·	540 m	MPC · JPL
659463	2019 FE_{15}	—	March 29, 2019	Mount Lemmon	Mount Lemmon Survey	·	510 m	MPC · JPL
659464	2019 FB_{17}	—	March 29, 2019	Mount Lemmon	Mount Lemmon Survey	L5	7.0 km	MPC · JPL
659465	2019 FS_{19}	—	April 28, 2014	Cerro Tololo-DECam	DECam	·	3.1 km	MPC · JPL
659466	2019 FE_{25}	—	March 29, 2019	Mount Lemmon	Mount Lemmon Survey	·	2.4 km	MPC · JPL
659467	2019 GD_{6}	—	November 10, 2016	Haleakala	Pan-STARRS 1	L5	10 km	MPC · JPL
659468	2019 GO_{6}	—	August 30, 2016	Haleakala	Pan-STARRS 1	·	2.0 km	MPC · JPL
659469	2019 GE_{7}	—	April 6, 2014	Mount Lemmon	Mount Lemmon Survey	·	1.8 km	MPC · JPL
659470	2019 GA_{8}	—	March 4, 2008	Mount Lemmon	Mount Lemmon Survey	·	2.5 km	MPC · JPL
659471	2019 GV_{8}	—	March 11, 2008	Kitt Peak	Spacewatch	·	2.6 km	MPC · JPL
659472	2019 GC_{9}	—	May 2, 2014	Mount Lemmon	Mount Lemmon Survey	·	2.0 km	MPC · JPL
659473	2019 GG_{9}	—	September 30, 2010	Mount Lemmon	Mount Lemmon Survey	·	2.2 km	MPC · JPL
659474	2019 GF_{14}	—	October 18, 2011	Piszkés-tető	K. Sárneczky, A. Szing	·	2.4 km	MPC · JPL
659475	2019 GS_{15}	—	October 7, 2004	Kitt Peak	Spacewatch	·	2.6 km	MPC · JPL
659476	2019 GT_{15}	—	April 2, 2014	Mount Lemmon	Mount Lemmon Survey	·	1.7 km	MPC · JPL
659477	2019 GA_{21}	—	April 2, 2005	Mount Lemmon	Mount Lemmon Survey	L5	8.5 km	MPC · JPL
659478	2019 GE_{22}	—	July 20, 1996	Xinglong	SCAP	·	830 m	MPC · JPL
659479	2019 GG_{22}	—	February 21, 2007	Mount Lemmon	Mount Lemmon Survey	LUT	3.5 km	MPC · JPL
659480	2019 GD_{23}	—	October 29, 2005	Mount Lemmon	Mount Lemmon Survey	·	3.2 km	MPC · JPL
659481	2019 GA_{25}	—	May 5, 2010	Mount Lemmon	Mount Lemmon Survey	·	2.1 km	MPC · JPL
659482	2019 GQ_{25}	—	April 1, 2019	XuYi	PMO NEO Survey Program	T_{j} (2.99) · EUP	2.9 km	MPC · JPL
659483	2019 GR_{25}	—	April 30, 2011	Mount Lemmon	Mount Lemmon Survey	T_{j} (2.98) · 3:2	4.9 km	MPC · JPL
659484	2019 GQ_{43}	—	September 2, 2010	Mount Lemmon	Mount Lemmon Survey	EOS	1.4 km	MPC · JPL
659485	2019 GJ_{50}	—	April 6, 2019	Haleakala	Pan-STARRS 1	·	520 m	MPC · JPL
659486	2019 GH_{51}	—	November 23, 2015	Haleakala	Pan-STARRS 1	H	440 m	MPC · JPL
659487	2019 GW_{55}	—	April 5, 2019	Haleakala	Pan-STARRS 1	H	470 m	MPC · JPL
659488	2019 GA_{60}	—	April 5, 2019	Haleakala	Pan-STARRS 1	VER	2.1 km	MPC · JPL
659489	2019 GQ_{79}	—	May 20, 2015	Haleakala	Pan-STARRS 1	·	1.3 km	MPC · JPL
659490	2019 GN_{108}	—	August 7, 2016	Haleakala	Pan-STARRS 1	·	1.3 km	MPC · JPL
659491	2019 GN_{114}	—	April 3, 2019	Haleakala	Pan-STARRS 1	·	2.5 km	MPC · JPL
659492	2019 GV_{117}	—	November 22, 2006	Mount Lemmon	Mount Lemmon Survey	·	2.0 km	MPC · JPL
659493	2019 GN_{152}	—	November 20, 2006	Kitt Peak	Spacewatch	·	1.6 km	MPC · JPL
659494	2019 HG	—	March 15, 2016	Mount Lemmon	Mount Lemmon Survey	·	630 m	MPC · JPL
659495	2019 HE_{1}	—	March 10, 2013	Nogales	M. Schwartz, P. R. Holvorcem	·	3.3 km	MPC · JPL
659496	2019 HR_{1}	—	April 23, 2009	Kitt Peak	Spacewatch	·	710 m	MPC · JPL
659497	2019 HG_{5}	—	October 28, 2010	Mount Lemmon	Mount Lemmon Survey	·	540 m	MPC · JPL
659498	2019 HZ_{6}	—	November 7, 2016	Mount Lemmon	Mount Lemmon Survey	EUP	3.0 km	MPC · JPL
659499	2019 HR_{13}	—	September 17, 2009	Mount Lemmon	Mount Lemmon Survey	·	2.9 km	MPC · JPL
659500	2019 JN_{11}	—	December 26, 2005	Kitt Peak	Spacewatch	·	2.6 km	MPC · JPL

== 659501–659600 ==
back to top

Designation			Discovery			Properties		Ref
Permanent	Provisional	Named after	Date	Site	Discoverer(s)	Category	Diam.	Ref
659501	2019 JX_{11}	—	April 13, 2008	Mount Lemmon	Mount Lemmon Survey	·	2.7 km	MPC · JPL
659502	2019 JZ_{12}	—	July 26, 2005	Palomar	NEAT	·	1.1 km	MPC · JPL
659503	2019 JB_{13}	—	April 8, 2008	Kitt Peak	Spacewatch	L5	8.5 km	MPC · JPL
659504	2019 JK_{17}	—	October 24, 2016	Mount Lemmon	Mount Lemmon Survey	·	2.4 km	MPC · JPL
659505	2019 JN_{21}	—	November 11, 2010	Mount Lemmon	Mount Lemmon Survey	·	3.2 km	MPC · JPL
659506	2019 JK_{32}	—	October 30, 2005	Mount Lemmon	Mount Lemmon Survey	·	2.8 km	MPC · JPL
659507	2019 JE_{34}	—	January 18, 2013	Mount Lemmon	Mount Lemmon Survey	·	1.6 km	MPC · JPL
659508	2019 JO_{41}	—	October 4, 2016	Mount Lemmon	Mount Lemmon Survey	·	3.5 km	MPC · JPL
659509	2019 JH_{43}	—	April 13, 2008	Mount Lemmon	Mount Lemmon Survey	·	2.8 km	MPC · JPL
659510	2019 JW_{46}	—	September 18, 2003	Kitt Peak	Spacewatch	·	610 m	MPC · JPL
659511	2019 JB_{47}	—	May 17, 2013	Mount Lemmon	Mount Lemmon Survey	·	580 m	MPC · JPL
659512	2019 JS_{56}	—	April 7, 2013	Mount Lemmon	Mount Lemmon Survey	THM	2.1 km	MPC · JPL
659513	2019 JW_{62}	—	May 9, 2019	Haleakala	Pan-STARRS 1	H	430 m	MPC · JPL
659514	2019 JQ_{68}	—	May 1, 2019	Haleakala	Pan-STARRS 1	T_{j} (2.98) · 3:2	4.0 km	MPC · JPL
659515	2019 JR_{102}	—	November 20, 2003	Apache Point	SDSS	·	630 m	MPC · JPL
659516	2019 JQ_{138}	—	January 22, 2015	Haleakala	Pan-STARRS 1	·	460 m	MPC · JPL
659517	2019 KE	—	December 24, 2014	Mount Lemmon	Mount Lemmon Survey	·	1.0 km	MPC · JPL
659518	2019 KS_{5}	—	November 25, 2006	Mount Lemmon	Mount Lemmon Survey	H	490 m	MPC · JPL
659519	2019 KA_{20}	—	May 30, 2019	Haleakala	Pan-STARRS 1	·	2.4 km	MPC · JPL
659520	2019 KD_{39}	—	May 29, 2019	Haleakala	Pan-STARRS 1	3:2	3.7 km	MPC · JPL
659521	2019 LS_{3}	—	April 17, 2016	Haleakala	Pan-STARRS 1	H	470 m	MPC · JPL
659522	2019 LC_{4}	—	November 3, 2010	Mount Lemmon	Mount Lemmon Survey	L4	9.2 km	MPC · JPL
659523	2019 LD_{10}	—	July 11, 2004	Socorro	LINEAR	·	1.3 km	MPC · JPL
659524	2019 LX_{19}	—	June 3, 2019	Haleakala	Pan-STARRS 1	·	2.2 km	MPC · JPL
659525	2019 MM_{1}	—	June 3, 2005	Kitt Peak	Spacewatch	H	560 m	MPC · JPL
659526	2019 ME_{17}	—	June 30, 2019	Haleakala	Pan-STARRS 1	L4	7.0 km	MPC · JPL
659527	2019 NS	—	May 4, 2005	Kitt Peak	D. E. Trilling, A. S. Rivkin	H	760 m	MPC · JPL
659528	2019 NM_{3}	—	July 26, 2011	Siding Spring	SSS	BAR	1.3 km	MPC · JPL
659529	2019 NY_{7}	—	July 1, 2019	Haleakala	Pan-STARRS 1	L4	5.6 km	MPC · JPL
659530	2019 NK_{8}	—	February 27, 2014	Mount Lemmon	Mount Lemmon Survey	L4	6.9 km	MPC · JPL
659531	2019 NO_{8}	—	January 24, 2012	Haleakala	Pan-STARRS 1	L4	6.9 km	MPC · JPL
659532	2019 NB_{9}	—	September 7, 2008	Mount Lemmon	Mount Lemmon Survey	L4	6.0 km	MPC · JPL
659533	2019 NX_{9}	—	February 5, 2013	Kitt Peak	Spacewatch	L4	5.9 km	MPC · JPL
659534	2019 NR_{13}	—	November 27, 2010	Mount Lemmon	Mount Lemmon Survey	L4	5.1 km	MPC · JPL
659535	2019 NX_{19}	—	August 2, 2016	Haleakala	Pan-STARRS 1	·	550 m	MPC · JPL
659536	2019 NV_{21}	—	June 16, 2012	Haleakala	Pan-STARRS 1	·	710 m	MPC · JPL
659537	2019 NU_{36}	—	July 10, 2019	Haleakala	Pan-STARRS 1	·	710 m	MPC · JPL
659538	2019 NV_{36}	—	July 1, 2019	Haleakala	Pan-STARRS 1	L4	6.8 km	MPC · JPL
659539	2019 NC_{37}	—	July 10, 2019	Haleakala	Pan-STARRS 1	L4	6.6 km	MPC · JPL
659540	2019 NN_{37}	—	July 2, 2019	Haleakala	Pan-STARRS 1	·	1.2 km	MPC · JPL
659541	2019 NS_{37}	—	July 1, 2019	Haleakala	Pan-STARRS 1	·	510 m	MPC · JPL
659542	2019 NU_{37}	—	July 7, 2019	Haleakala	Pan-STARRS 1	·	1.1 km	MPC · JPL
659543	2019 NK_{38}	—	July 7, 2019	Haleakala	Pan-STARRS 1	L4	5.9 km	MPC · JPL
659544	2019 NJ_{46}	—	July 4, 2019	Haleakala	Pan-STARRS 1	L4	7.0 km	MPC · JPL
659545	2019 NX_{51}	—	April 19, 2015	Cerro Tololo-DECam	DECam	L4	6.0 km	MPC · JPL
659546	2019 NY_{51}	—	April 17, 2015	Cerro Tololo-DECam	DECam	L4	6.0 km	MPC · JPL
659547	2019 NT_{57}	—	July 10, 2019	Haleakala	Pan-STARRS 1	·	920 m	MPC · JPL
659548	2019 NO_{64}	—	July 1, 2019	Haleakala	Pan-STARRS 1	L4	5.3 km	MPC · JPL
659549	2019 NK_{78}	—	May 20, 2015	Cerro Tololo-DECam	DECam	·	520 m	MPC · JPL
659550	2019 NM_{78}	—	July 1, 2019	Haleakala	Pan-STARRS 1	·	580 m	MPC · JPL
659551	2019 NT_{80}	—	July 27, 2001	Anderson Mesa	LONEOS	PHO	710 m	MPC · JPL
659552	2019 OL_{7}	—	March 11, 2008	Kitt Peak	Spacewatch	·	790 m	MPC · JPL
659553	2019 OM_{7}	—	January 16, 2009	Mount Lemmon	Mount Lemmon Survey	·	800 m	MPC · JPL
659554	2019 OW_{7}	—	September 7, 2008	Mount Lemmon	Mount Lemmon Survey	·	960 m	MPC · JPL
659555	2019 OG_{8}	—	January 19, 2013	Mount Lemmon	Mount Lemmon Survey	L4	6.4 km	MPC · JPL
659556	2019 OE_{10}	—	September 2, 2008	Kitt Peak	Spacewatch	·	3.0 km	MPC · JPL
659557	2019 OL_{10}	—	April 20, 2007	Kitt Peak	Spacewatch	NYS	1.3 km	MPC · JPL
659558	2019 OG_{12}	—	April 23, 2007	Mount Lemmon	Mount Lemmon Survey	·	3.2 km	MPC · JPL
659559	2019 OC_{15}	—	January 12, 2011	Mount Lemmon	Mount Lemmon Survey	·	430 m	MPC · JPL
659560	2019 OH_{15}	—	October 31, 2008	Kitt Peak	Spacewatch	PHO	1.2 km	MPC · JPL
659561	2019 OL_{15}	—	December 30, 2013	Mount Lemmon	Mount Lemmon Survey	·	810 m	MPC · JPL
659562	2019 OF_{17}	—	March 16, 2007	Kitt Peak	Spacewatch	·	1.3 km	MPC · JPL
659563	2019 OH_{17}	—	February 2, 2017	Haleakala	Pan-STARRS 1	·	1.3 km	MPC · JPL
659564	2019 OA_{18}	—	September 18, 2001	Anderson Mesa	LONEOS	·	1.0 km	MPC · JPL
659565	2019 OY_{23}	—	July 28, 2019	Haleakala	Pan-STARRS 2	·	600 m	MPC · JPL
659566	2019 OW_{24}	—	July 28, 2019	Haleakala	Pan-STARRS 1	L4	6.8 km	MPC · JPL
659567	2019 ON_{26}	—	June 30, 2019	Haleakala	Pan-STARRS 1	L4	6.5 km	MPC · JPL
659568	2019 OD_{31}	—	September 6, 2008	Mount Lemmon	Mount Lemmon Survey	L4	5.3 km	MPC · JPL
659569	2019 OY_{31}	—	July 30, 2019	Haleakala	Pan-STARRS 1	L4	6.3 km	MPC · JPL
659570	2019 PM_{4}	—	February 12, 2004	Kitt Peak	Spacewatch	·	570 m	MPC · JPL
659571	2019 PA_{5}	—	January 4, 2012	Kitt Peak	Spacewatch	L4	6.1 km	MPC · JPL
659572	2019 PQ_{8}	—	January 10, 2013	Haleakala	Pan-STARRS 1	L4	6.5 km	MPC · JPL
659573	2019 PS_{10}	—	September 24, 2008	Kitt Peak	Spacewatch	L4	6.7 km	MPC · JPL
659574	2019 PR_{17}	—	February 8, 2000	Kitt Peak	Spacewatch	·	1.1 km	MPC · JPL
659575	2019 PV_{32}	—	August 11, 2019	Haleakala	Pan-STARRS 1	·	620 m	MPC · JPL
659576	2019 PZ_{32}	—	August 7, 2019	Haleakala	Pan-STARRS 2	(2076)	590 m	MPC · JPL
659577	2019 PQ_{33}	—	August 7, 2019	Haleakala	Pan-STARRS 1	(194)	1.4 km	MPC · JPL
659578	2019 PS_{33}	—	August 4, 2019	Haleakala	Pan-STARRS 1	·	910 m	MPC · JPL
659579	2019 PU_{41}	—	April 18, 2015	Cerro Tololo-DECam	DECam	L4	5.8 km	MPC · JPL
659580	2019 PC_{45}	—	August 13, 2019	Haleakala	Pan-STARRS 1	·	1.2 km	MPC · JPL
659581	2019 PZ_{54}	—	August 5, 2019	Haleakala	Pan-STARRS 1	L4	6.3 km	MPC · JPL
659582	2019 PG_{59}	—	August 5, 2019	Haleakala	Pan-STARRS 1	L4	6.2 km	MPC · JPL
659583	2019 PW_{60}	—	April 18, 2015	Cerro Tololo-DECam	DECam	L4	5.8 km	MPC · JPL
659584	2019 PX_{60}	—	August 8, 2019	Haleakala	Pan-STARRS 1	L4	5.8 km	MPC · JPL
659585	2019 PQ_{65}	—	May 12, 2015	Mount Lemmon	Mount Lemmon Survey	·	580 m	MPC · JPL
659586	2019 PV_{67}	—	August 8, 2019	Haleakala	Pan-STARRS 1	L4	5.9 km	MPC · JPL
659587	2019 PE_{68}	—	October 1, 2008	Mount Lemmon	Mount Lemmon Survey	L4	6.4 km	MPC · JPL
659588	2019 QS_{11}	—	November 26, 2012	Mount Lemmon	Mount Lemmon Survey	·	770 m	MPC · JPL
659589	2019 QF_{20}	—	June 16, 2012	Haleakala	Pan-STARRS 1	·	680 m	MPC · JPL
659590	2019 QL_{27}	—	September 8, 1996	Kitt Peak	Spacewatch	·	2.3 km	MPC · JPL
659591	2019 QW_{30}	—	August 27, 2019	Mount Lemmon	Mount Lemmon Survey	·	1.0 km	MPC · JPL
659592	2019 QD_{31}	—	August 24, 2019	Haleakala	Pan-STARRS 1	·	900 m	MPC · JPL
659593	2019 QM_{36}	—	February 27, 2014	Haleakala	Pan-STARRS 1	L4	5.9 km	MPC · JPL
659594	2019 QB_{44}	—	May 18, 2015	Haleakala	Pan-STARRS 1	L4	6.4 km	MPC · JPL
659595	2019 QO_{53}	—	August 29, 2019	Haleakala	Pan-STARRS 1	L4	5.7 km	MPC · JPL
659596	2019 QX_{58}	—	January 25, 2007	Kitt Peak	Spacewatch	·	460 m	MPC · JPL
659597	2019 RT_{4}	—	November 24, 2008	Kitt Peak	Spacewatch	·	1.4 km	MPC · JPL
659598	2019 RV_{4}	—	December 17, 2007	Mount Lemmon	Mount Lemmon Survey	·	1.3 km	MPC · JPL
659599	2019 RR_{5}	—	November 11, 2006	Kitt Peak	Spacewatch	·	610 m	MPC · JPL
659600	2019 RY_{21}	—	February 24, 2006	Kitt Peak	Spacewatch	·	1.3 km	MPC · JPL

== 659601–659700 ==
back to top

Designation			Discovery			Properties		Ref
Permanent	Provisional	Named after	Date	Site	Discoverer(s)	Category	Diam.	Ref
659601	2019 RY_{28}	—	September 7, 2019	Mount Lemmon	Mount Lemmon Survey	(5)	1.1 km	MPC · JPL
659602	2019 RS_{31}	—	September 5, 2019	Mount Lemmon	Mount Lemmon Survey	·	480 m	MPC · JPL
659603	2019 RK_{33}	—	September 6, 2019	Haleakala	Pan-STARRS 1	·	1.4 km	MPC · JPL
659604	2019 RA_{42}	—	October 9, 2008	Mount Lemmon	Mount Lemmon Survey	L4	6.4 km	MPC · JPL
659605	2019 RT_{57}	—	September 8, 2019	Haleakala	Pan-STARRS 1	V	410 m	MPC · JPL
659606	2019 RU_{60}	—	April 23, 2014	Cerro Tololo	DECam	·	740 m	MPC · JPL
659607	2019 RN_{87}	—	July 28, 2019	Haleakala	Pan-STARRS 2	·	1.0 km	MPC · JPL
659608	2019 RH_{91}	—	October 25, 2005	Mount Lemmon	Mount Lemmon Survey	·	790 m	MPC · JPL
659609	2019 SZ_{2}	—	September 21, 2019	Palomar	Zwicky Transient Facility	AMO	390 m	MPC · JPL
659610	2019 SQ_{3}	—	December 5, 2008	Kitt Peak	Spacewatch	·	1.3 km	MPC · JPL
659611	2019 SA_{12}	—	January 19, 2013	Mount Lemmon	Mount Lemmon Survey	NYS	970 m	MPC · JPL
659612	2019 SP_{17}	—	August 26, 2012	Haleakala	Pan-STARRS 1	·	690 m	MPC · JPL
659613	2019 SN_{38}	—	October 1, 2005	Kitt Peak	Spacewatch	·	590 m	MPC · JPL
659614	2019 SB_{46}	—	September 19, 2014	Haleakala	Pan-STARRS 1	·	1.5 km	MPC · JPL
659615	2019 SY_{52}	—	October 13, 2012	Kitt Peak	Spacewatch	·	1.0 km	MPC · JPL
659616	2019 SG_{55}	—	April 3, 2011	Haleakala	Pan-STARRS 1	V	620 m	MPC · JPL
659617	2019 SN_{56}	—	October 8, 2008	Mount Lemmon	Mount Lemmon Survey	·	1.1 km	MPC · JPL
659618	2019 ST_{63}	—	November 12, 2007	Mount Lemmon	Mount Lemmon Survey	JUN	1.2 km	MPC · JPL
659619	2019 SV_{65}	—	October 9, 2010	Catalina	CSS	·	1.9 km	MPC · JPL
659620	2019 SA_{72}	—	October 8, 2016	Haleakala	Pan-STARRS 1	·	640 m	MPC · JPL
659621	2019 SV_{80}	—	November 6, 2016	Mount Lemmon	Mount Lemmon Survey	·	530 m	MPC · JPL
659622	2019 SG_{82}	—	September 27, 2019	Haleakala	Pan-STARRS 1	·	980 m	MPC · JPL
659623	2019 SK_{82}	—	June 19, 2010	Mount Lemmon	Mount Lemmon Survey	·	1.2 km	MPC · JPL
659624	2019 SL_{82}	—	September 28, 2019	Mount Lemmon	Mount Lemmon Survey	KON	1.8 km	MPC · JPL
659625	2019 SR_{82}	—	September 25, 2019	Haleakala	Pan-STARRS 1	·	550 m	MPC · JPL
659626	2019 SS_{82}	—	September 24, 2019	Haleakala	Pan-STARRS 1	·	780 m	MPC · JPL
659627	2019 SH_{83}	—	September 27, 2019	Haleakala	Pan-STARRS 1	·	880 m	MPC · JPL
659628	2019 SV_{83}	—	September 24, 2019	Haleakala	Pan-STARRS 1	·	710 m	MPC · JPL
659629	2019 SX_{83}	—	September 24, 2019	Haleakala	Pan-STARRS 1	V	440 m	MPC · JPL
659630	2019 ST_{108}	—	September 25, 2019	Haleakala	Pan-STARRS 1	·	930 m	MPC · JPL
659631	2019 SN_{136}	—	May 11, 2015	Mount Lemmon	Mount Lemmon Survey	L4	6.9 km	MPC · JPL
659632	2019 TA_{16}	—	November 6, 2012	Mount Lemmon	Mount Lemmon Survey	NYS	790 m	MPC · JPL
659633	2019 TP_{34}	—	October 8, 2019	Mount Lemmon	Mount Lemmon Survey	MAR	710 m	MPC · JPL
659634	2019 TQ_{34}	—	October 9, 2019	Mount Lemmon	Mount Lemmon Survey	·	1.6 km	MPC · JPL
659635	2019 TX_{34}	—	April 23, 2014	Cerro Tololo	DECam	MAS	580 m	MPC · JPL
659636	2019 TY_{34}	—	October 8, 2019	Mount Lemmon	Mount Lemmon Survey	·	1.1 km	MPC · JPL
659637	2019 TK_{35}	—	October 8, 2019	Haleakala	Pan-STARRS 1	RAF	710 m	MPC · JPL
659638	2019 TQ_{59}	—	October 4, 2019	Palomar	Zwicky Transient Facility	·	640 m	MPC · JPL
659639	2019 UA_{5}	—	April 4, 2014	Mount Lemmon	Mount Lemmon Survey	·	1.6 km	MPC · JPL
659640	2019 UP_{6}	—	November 19, 2009	Catalina	CSS	·	920 m	MPC · JPL
659641	2019 UQ_{26}	—	December 4, 2015	Haleakala	Pan-STARRS 1	RAF	710 m	MPC · JPL
659642	2019 UC_{30}	—	October 16, 2006	Kitt Peak	Spacewatch	·	530 m	MPC · JPL
659643	2019 UO_{30}	—	September 17, 1998	Kitt Peak	Spacewatch	·	930 m	MPC · JPL
659644	2019 UP_{33}	—	October 23, 2019	Haleakala	Pan-STARRS 1	·	1.7 km	MPC · JPL
659645	2019 UQ_{33}	—	October 23, 2019	Haleakala	Pan-STARRS 1	·	1.2 km	MPC · JPL
659646	2019 UT_{33}	—	October 23, 2019	Kitt Peak	Spacewatch	·	1.2 km	MPC · JPL
659647	2019 UU_{33}	—	October 27, 2019	Haleakala	Pan-STARRS 1	JUN	640 m	MPC · JPL
659648	2019 UM_{34}	—	October 24, 2019	Mount Lemmon	Mount Lemmon Survey	MAR	660 m	MPC · JPL
659649	2019 UW_{34}	—	October 23, 2019	Haleakala	Pan-STARRS 1	·	850 m	MPC · JPL
659650	2019 UX_{34}	—	October 23, 2019	Haleakala	Pan-STARRS 1	V	450 m	MPC · JPL
659651	2019 UE_{35}	—	October 21, 2019	Mount Lemmon	Mount Lemmon Survey	·	1.2 km	MPC · JPL
659652	2019 UN_{35}	—	November 16, 2009	Mount Lemmon	Mount Lemmon Survey	·	520 m	MPC · JPL
659653	2019 UT_{36}	—	October 23, 2019	Haleakala	Pan-STARRS 1	·	1.4 km	MPC · JPL
659654	2019 UN_{45}	—	April 15, 2018	Mount Lemmon	Mount Lemmon Survey	·	960 m	MPC · JPL
659655	2019 UO_{92}	—	October 23, 2019	Mount Lemmon	Mount Lemmon Survey	·	1.3 km	MPC · JPL
659656	2019 UO_{95}	—	October 24, 2019	Mount Lemmon	Mount Lemmon Survey	·	1.7 km	MPC · JPL
659657	2019 UB_{102}	—	June 30, 2010	WISE	WISE	·	1.3 km	MPC · JPL
659658	2019 UZ_{103}	—	October 25, 2019	Haleakala	Pan-STARRS 2	EUN	1.1 km	MPC · JPL
659659	2019 UF_{105}	—	October 22, 2019	Mount Lemmon	Mount Lemmon Survey	·	1.1 km	MPC · JPL
659660	2019 UJ_{105}	—	October 15, 2012	Haleakala	Pan-STARRS 1	·	660 m	MPC · JPL
659661	2019 UL_{105}	—	December 25, 2005	Mount Lemmon	Mount Lemmon Survey	MAS	480 m	MPC · JPL
659662	2019 UG_{123}	—	October 25, 2019	Mount Lemmon	Mount Lemmon Survey	·	1.8 km	MPC · JPL
659663	2019 VX_{7}	—	November 5, 2019	Mount Lemmon	Mount Lemmon Survey	(5)	900 m	MPC · JPL
659664	2019 VY_{7}	—	November 2, 2019	Haleakala	Pan-STARRS 1	·	2.0 km	MPC · JPL
659665	2019 VP_{9}	—	November 8, 2019	Mount Lemmon	Mount Lemmon Survey	·	1.2 km	MPC · JPL
659666	2019 VQ_{18}	—	November 2, 2019	Haleakala	Pan-STARRS 1	·	900 m	MPC · JPL
659667	2019 VZ_{23}	—	November 8, 2019	Mount Lemmon	Mount Lemmon Survey	EUN	930 m	MPC · JPL
659668	2019 WQ_{7}	—	November 28, 2019	Haleakala	Pan-STARRS 1	MAS	660 m	MPC · JPL
659669	2019 WK_{18}	—	November 24, 2019	Mount Lemmon	Mount Lemmon Survey	KON	1.9 km	MPC · JPL
659670	2019 XK_{4}	—	December 2, 2019	Mount Lemmon	Mount Lemmon Survey	·	890 m	MPC · JPL
659671	2019 YQ_{7}	—	December 20, 2019	Mount Lemmon	Mount Lemmon Survey	·	1.2 km	MPC · JPL
659672	2019 YR_{7}	—	April 5, 2016	Haleakala	Pan-STARRS 1	·	1.6 km	MPC · JPL
659673	2019 YU_{7}	—	December 30, 2019	Haleakala	Pan-STARRS 1	HOF	2.2 km	MPC · JPL
659674	2019 YH_{13}	—	February 28, 2008	Mount Lemmon	Mount Lemmon Survey	·	780 m	MPC · JPL
659675	2019 YK_{13}	—	August 9, 2005	Cerro Tololo	Deep Ecliptic Survey	·	1.0 km	MPC · JPL
659676	2019 YW_{41}	—	February 3, 2016	Haleakala	Pan-STARRS 1	HNS	790 m	MPC · JPL
659677	2020 AC_{4}	—	November 10, 2018	Mount Lemmon	Mount Lemmon Survey	BRA	1.3 km	MPC · JPL
659678	2020 AS_{4}	—	January 4, 2020	Mount Lemmon	Mount Lemmon Survey	·	1.0 km	MPC · JPL
659679	2020 AE_{12}	—	January 1, 2020	Haleakala	Pan-STARRS 1	·	1.2 km	MPC · JPL
659680	2020 AK_{12}	—	January 5, 2020	Mount Lemmon	Mount Lemmon Survey	·	1.0 km	MPC · JPL
659681	2020 AS_{19}	—	January 4, 2020	Mount Lemmon	Mount Lemmon Survey	HNS	920 m	MPC · JPL
659682	2020 AC_{23}	—	January 2, 2020	Haleakala	Pan-STARRS 1	NAE	2.1 km	MPC · JPL
659683	2020 BR_{17}	—	January 25, 2020	Haleakala	Pan-STARRS 1	·	1.4 km	MPC · JPL
659684	2020 BW_{17}	—	January 18, 2020	Mount Lemmon	Mount Lemmon Survey	·	1.5 km	MPC · JPL
659685	2020 BR_{27}	—	January 7, 2006	Kitt Peak	Spacewatch	PAD	1.2 km	MPC · JPL
659686	2020 BZ_{28}	—	October 18, 2018	Mount Lemmon	Mount Lemmon Survey	·	1.9 km	MPC · JPL
659687	2020 BN_{29}	—	October 17, 2018	Haleakala	Pan-STARRS 2	EOS	1.4 km	MPC · JPL
659688	2020 BB_{31}	—	January 21, 2020	Haleakala	Pan-STARRS 2	KOR	930 m	MPC · JPL
659689	2020 BM_{31}	—	January 21, 2020	Haleakala	Pan-STARRS 2	AGN	880 m	MPC · JPL
659690	2020 BC_{38}	—	November 1, 2018	Mount Lemmon	Mount Lemmon Survey	·	1.3 km	MPC · JPL
659691	2020 BK_{39}	—	February 25, 2011	Mount Lemmon	Mount Lemmon Survey	·	1.4 km	MPC · JPL
659692	2020 BQ_{46}	—	January 16, 2015	Haleakala	Pan-STARRS 1	EOS	1.2 km	MPC · JPL
659693	2020 BW_{47}	—	May 12, 2013	Haleakala	Pan-STARRS 1	·	1.1 km	MPC · JPL
659694	2020 BU_{54}	—	July 27, 2017	Haleakala	Pan-STARRS 1	EOS	1.6 km	MPC · JPL
659695	2020 BV_{55}	—	October 21, 2018	Mount Lemmon	Mount Lemmon Survey	MAR	810 m	MPC · JPL
659696	2020 BS_{58}	—	July 26, 2017	Haleakala	Pan-STARRS 1	·	1.3 km	MPC · JPL
659697	2020 BZ_{62}	—	January 19, 2020	Haleakala	Pan-STARRS 1	·	1.3 km	MPC · JPL
659698	2020 BD_{66}	—	January 30, 2020	Haleakala	Pan-STARRS 1	TIN	970 m	MPC · JPL
659699	2020 BS_{74}	—	January 21, 2020	Haleakala	Pan-STARRS 1	EOS	1.6 km	MPC · JPL
659700	2020 BL_{80}	—	January 23, 2020	Mount Lemmon	Mount Lemmon Survey	·	1.1 km	MPC · JPL

== 659701–659800 ==
back to top

Designation			Discovery			Properties		Ref
Permanent	Provisional	Named after	Date	Site	Discoverer(s)	Category	Diam.	Ref
659701	2020 BT_{80}	—	January 21, 2020	Haleakala	Pan-STARRS 1	URS	2.3 km	MPC · JPL
659702	2020 BL_{82}	—	August 14, 2013	Haleakala	Pan-STARRS 1	·	1.6 km	MPC · JPL
659703	2020 BZ_{86}	—	January 21, 2020	Haleakala	Pan-STARRS 1	·	1.3 km	MPC · JPL
659704	2020 BB_{87}	—	October 29, 2000	Kitt Peak	Spacewatch	·	1.3 km	MPC · JPL
659705	2020 BB_{89}	—	January 25, 2020	Mount Lemmon	Mount Lemmon Survey	·	1.7 km	MPC · JPL
659706	2020 BG_{94}	—	January 21, 2020	Haleakala	Pan-STARRS 1	·	1.7 km	MPC · JPL
659707	2020 BE_{99}	—	July 2, 2017	Mount Lemmon	Mount Lemmon Survey	·	3.1 km	MPC · JPL
659708	2020 BO_{102}	—	May 17, 2009	Mount Lemmon	Mount Lemmon Survey	·	1.1 km	MPC · JPL
659709	2020 BV_{110}	—	November 24, 2008	Kitt Peak	Spacewatch	·	1.4 km	MPC · JPL
659710	2020 BP_{117}	—	January 26, 2020	Haleakala	Pan-STARRS 1	·	1.5 km	MPC · JPL
659711	2020 BX_{145}	—	October 8, 2008	Mount Lemmon	Mount Lemmon Survey	·	1.5 km	MPC · JPL
659712	2020 CZ_{3}	—	October 5, 2013	Haleakala	Pan-STARRS 1	·	1.5 km	MPC · JPL
659713	2020 DN_{5}	—	September 15, 2017	Haleakala	Pan-STARRS 1	·	2.0 km	MPC · JPL
659714	2020 DS_{14}	—	March 10, 2010	WISE	WISE	EOS	1.4 km	MPC · JPL
659715	2020 DN_{16}	—	October 11, 2012	Kitt Peak	Spacewatch	·	2.0 km	MPC · JPL
659716	2020 DO_{16}	—	September 2, 2017	Haleakala	Pan-STARRS 1	·	2.7 km	MPC · JPL
659717	2020 DT_{16}	—	January 20, 2015	Haleakala	Pan-STARRS 1	·	1.3 km	MPC · JPL
659718	2020 FL_{8}	—	March 17, 2020	XuYi	PMO NEO Survey Program	·	2.4 km	MPC · JPL
659719	2020 FP_{8}	—	March 21, 2020	Haleakala	Pan-STARRS 1	·	1.6 km	MPC · JPL
659720	2020 FA_{27}	—	April 18, 2015	Cerro Tololo-DECam	DECam	·	1.6 km	MPC · JPL
659721	2020 FK_{35}	—	March 24, 2020	Mount Lemmon	Mount Lemmon Survey	·	2.6 km	MPC · JPL
659722	2020 GO_{3}	—	April 25, 2007	Kitt Peak	Spacewatch	·	1.0 km	MPC · JPL
659723	2020 GT_{4}	—	April 3, 2020	Mount Lemmon	Mount Lemmon Survey	·	1.7 km	MPC · JPL
659724	2020 GP_{5}	—	April 1, 2020	Haleakala	Pan-STARRS 1	·	2.2 km	MPC · JPL
659725	2020 GV_{6}	—	August 29, 2016	Mount Lemmon	Mount Lemmon Survey	·	1.5 km	MPC · JPL
659726	2020 GC_{7}	—	September 23, 2008	Mount Lemmon	Mount Lemmon Survey	EUN	930 m	MPC · JPL
659727	2020 GL_{11}	—	January 29, 2020	Mount Lemmon	Mount Lemmon Survey	·	1.8 km	MPC · JPL
659728	2020 GX_{20}	—	September 12, 2001	Kitt Peak	Deep Ecliptic Survey	L5	7.1 km	MPC · JPL
659729	2020 HS_{11}	—	July 20, 2010	WISE	WISE	·	1.8 km	MPC · JPL
659730	2020 HY_{11}	—	April 21, 2020	Haleakala	Pan-STARRS 1	·	1.2 km	MPC · JPL
659731	2020 HF_{13}	—	November 21, 2008	Kitt Peak	Spacewatch	·	2.2 km	MPC · JPL
659732	2020 HY_{13}	—	March 21, 2015	Haleakala	Pan-STARRS 1	·	2.0 km	MPC · JPL
659733	2020 HB_{18}	—	December 21, 2014	Haleakala	Pan-STARRS 1	·	1.2 km	MPC · JPL
659734	2020 HW_{18}	—	January 10, 2019	Haleakala	Pan-STARRS 1	·	2.3 km	MPC · JPL
659735	2020 HO_{19}	—	April 20, 2020	Haleakala	Pan-STARRS 2	EOS	1.3 km	MPC · JPL
659736	2020 HA_{21}	—	April 29, 2008	Kitt Peak	Spacewatch	L5	7.2 km	MPC · JPL
659737	2020 HW_{28}	—	December 8, 2017	Haleakala	Pan-STARRS 1	·	1.8 km	MPC · JPL
659738	2020 HY_{28}	—	March 24, 2009	Mount Lemmon	Mount Lemmon Survey	·	2.6 km	MPC · JPL
659739	2020 HU_{30}	—	January 10, 2008	Mount Lemmon	Mount Lemmon Survey	EOS	1.5 km	MPC · JPL
659740	2020 HL_{34}	—	April 16, 2020	Mount Lemmon	Mount Lemmon Survey	·	2.2 km	MPC · JPL
659741	2020 HQ_{34}	—	April 20, 2020	Haleakala	Pan-STARRS 2	·	2.1 km	MPC · JPL
659742	2020 HS_{39}	—	September 4, 2011	Haleakala	Pan-STARRS 1	·	2.2 km	MPC · JPL
659743	2020 HF_{41}	—	April 18, 2015	Cerro Tololo-DECam	DECam	·	1.6 km	MPC · JPL
659744	2020 HS_{42}	—	April 16, 2020	Mount Lemmon	Mount Lemmon Survey	·	1.4 km	MPC · JPL
659745	2020 HD_{49}	—	September 23, 2017	Haleakala	Pan-STARRS 1	AGN	980 m	MPC · JPL
659746	2020 HQ_{61}	—	March 29, 2014	Mount Lemmon	Mount Lemmon Survey	URS	2.3 km	MPC · JPL
659747	2020 HJ_{62}	—	December 16, 2017	Mount Lemmon	Mount Lemmon Survey	·	1.5 km	MPC · JPL
659748	2020 HF_{73}	—	October 8, 2012	Haleakala	Pan-STARRS 1	KOR	1.2 km	MPC · JPL
659749	2020 HQ_{105}	—	April 19, 2020	Haleakala	Pan-STARRS 1	KOR	1.0 km	MPC · JPL
659750	2020 HN_{106}	—	November 4, 2007	Mount Lemmon	Mount Lemmon Survey	·	1.4 km	MPC · JPL
659751	2020 HL_{116}	—	April 18, 2015	Cerro Tololo-DECam	DECam	·	1.5 km	MPC · JPL
659752	2020 HJ_{158}	—	October 10, 2007	Kitt Peak	Spacewatch	·	1.5 km	MPC · JPL
659753	2020 HD_{160}	—	April 16, 2020	Mount Lemmon	Mount Lemmon Survey	·	2.6 km	MPC · JPL
659754	2020 JG_{4}	—	August 12, 2018	Haleakala	Pan-STARRS 1	·	960 m	MPC · JPL
659755	2020 JJ_{5}	—	January 11, 2019	Haleakala	Pan-STARRS 1	·	2.2 km	MPC · JPL
659756	2020 JP_{5}	—	May 12, 2020	Haleakala	Pan-STARRS 2	·	2.0 km	MPC · JPL
659757	2020 JR_{5}	—	August 30, 2016	Haleakala	Pan-STARRS 1	·	2.3 km	MPC · JPL
659758	2020 JX_{5}	—	October 17, 2013	Mount Lemmon	Mount Lemmon Survey	HNS	1.0 km	MPC · JPL
659759	2020 JZ_{5}	—	September 12, 2007	Mount Lemmon	Mount Lemmon Survey	·	1.6 km	MPC · JPL
659760	2020 JE_{12}	—	November 14, 2017	Mount Lemmon	Mount Lemmon Survey	·	2.2 km	MPC · JPL
659761	2020 JN_{12}	—	September 8, 2016	Haleakala	Pan-STARRS 1	·	1.9 km	MPC · JPL
659762	2020 JY_{12}	—	February 28, 2014	Haleakala	Pan-STARRS 1	·	1.7 km	MPC · JPL
659763	2020 JE_{13}	—	February 28, 2019	Mount Lemmon	Mount Lemmon Survey	·	2.2 km	MPC · JPL
659764	2020 JR_{15}	—	January 27, 2020	Haleakala	Pan-STARRS 1	·	1.6 km	MPC · JPL
659765	2020 JA_{20}	—	November 10, 2006	Kitt Peak	Spacewatch	·	2.0 km	MPC · JPL
659766	2020 JF_{32}	—	May 15, 2020	Haleakala	Pan-STARRS 1	·	2.5 km	MPC · JPL
659767	2020 KL_{21}	—	May 20, 2020	Haleakala	Pan-STARRS 1	·	1.8 km	MPC · JPL
659768	2020 KT_{24}	—	April 28, 2014	Cerro Tololo	DECam	·	2.3 km	MPC · JPL
659769	2020 KL_{26}	—	April 25, 2014	Cerro Tololo	DECam	·	2.7 km	MPC · JPL
659770	2020 KA_{30}	—	September 9, 2008	Mount Lemmon	Mount Lemmon Survey	·	1.2 km	MPC · JPL
659771	2020 KS_{36}	—	August 26, 2016	Haleakala	Pan-STARRS 1	·	2.5 km	MPC · JPL
659772	2020 KK_{38}	—	September 12, 2016	Mount Lemmon	Mount Lemmon Survey	·	2.0 km	MPC · JPL
659773	2020 MD_{20}	—	June 29, 2020	Haleakala	Pan-STARRS 1	·	740 m	MPC · JPL
659774	2020 MJ_{22}	—	June 21, 2020	Haleakala	Pan-STARRS 1	H	420 m	MPC · JPL
659775	2020 OA_{7}	—	July 20, 2020	Haleakala	Pan-STARRS 1	H	360 m	MPC · JPL
659776	2020 OP_{48}	—	July 17, 2020	Haleakala	Pan-STARRS 1	L4	6.9 km	MPC · JPL
659777	2020 OF_{49}	—	July 21, 2020	Haleakala	Pan-STARRS 1	H	390 m	MPC · JPL
659778	2020 PO_{25}	—	August 13, 2020	Haleakala	Pan-STARRS 2	L4	7.9 km	MPC · JPL
659779	2020 PY_{25}	—	August 15, 2020	Haleakala	Pan-STARRS 1	L4	5.8 km	MPC · JPL
659780	2020 PP_{39}	—	April 19, 2015	Cerro Tololo-DECam	DECam	L4	6.5 km	MPC · JPL
659781	2020 QH_{11}	—	January 8, 2013	Mount Lemmon	Mount Lemmon Survey	L4	7.9 km	MPC · JPL
659782	2020 QT_{18}	—	April 10, 2015	Mount Lemmon	Mount Lemmon Survey	L4	8.0 km	MPC · JPL
659783	2020 QM_{30}	—	August 18, 2020	Mount Lemmon	Mount Lemmon Survey	L4	6.1 km	MPC · JPL
659784	2020 QA_{31}	—	August 23, 2020	Haleakala	Pan-STARRS 1	L4	5.8 km	MPC · JPL
659785	2020 QD_{65}	—	April 19, 2015	Cerro Tololo-DECam	DECam	L4	5.8 km	MPC · JPL
659786	2020 QE_{84}	—	April 18, 2015	Cerro Tololo-DECam	DECam	L4	6.0 km	MPC · JPL
659787	2020 RF_{84}	—	September 3, 2008	Kitt Peak	Spacewatch	L4	6.0 km	MPC · JPL
659788	2020 RX_{86}	—	September 19, 2008	Kitt Peak	Spacewatch	L4	6.5 km	MPC · JPL
659789	2020 RU_{88}	—	September 7, 2008	Mount Lemmon	Mount Lemmon Survey	L4	6.2 km	MPC · JPL
659790	2020 RP_{117}	—	May 18, 2015	Haleakala	Pan-STARRS 1	L4	7.4 km	MPC · JPL
659791	2020 RT_{118}	—	September 9, 2020	Haleakala	Pan-STARRS 1	L4	5.7 km	MPC · JPL
659792	2020 SL_{28}	—	September 26, 2020	Haleakala	Pan-STARRS 1	·	470 m	MPC · JPL
659793	2020 SZ_{62}	—	February 26, 2014	Haleakala	Pan-STARRS 1	L4	6.9 km	MPC · JPL
659794	2020 SV_{70}	—	September 16, 2020	Haleakala	Pan-STARRS 1	L4	5.7 km	MPC · JPL
659795	2020 TF_{12}	—	September 24, 2008	Kitt Peak	Spacewatch	L4	6.7 km	MPC · JPL
659796	2020 TV_{22}	—	October 11, 2020	Mount Lemmon	Mount Lemmon Survey	H	450 m	MPC · JPL
659797	2020 VG_{8}	—	November 11, 2020	Mount Lemmon	Mount Lemmon Survey	·	500 m	MPC · JPL
659798	2020 XD_{20}	—	December 13, 2006	Mount Lemmon	Mount Lemmon Survey	V	440 m	MPC · JPL
659799	2020 XX_{25}	—	September 5, 2000	Kitt Peak	Spacewatch	·	570 m	MPC · JPL
659800	2020 YF_{9}	—	May 20, 2005	Mount Lemmon	Mount Lemmon Survey	·	1.6 km	MPC · JPL

== 659801–659900 ==
back to top

Designation			Discovery			Properties		Ref
Permanent	Provisional	Named after	Date	Site	Discoverer(s)	Category	Diam.	Ref
659801	2020 YU_{15}	—	November 28, 2016	Haleakala	Pan-STARRS 1	V	470 m	MPC · JPL
659802	2020 YS_{17}	—	December 24, 2013	Mount Lemmon	Mount Lemmon Survey	·	590 m	MPC · JPL
659803	2020 YD_{19}	—	August 7, 2016	Haleakala	Pan-STARRS 1	·	470 m	MPC · JPL
659804	2020 YK_{25}	—	August 11, 2012	Siding Spring	SSS	V	560 m	MPC · JPL
659805	2021 AW_{16}	—	December 7, 2005	Kitt Peak	Spacewatch	·	980 m	MPC · JPL
659806	2021 AL_{18}	—	October 26, 2016	Kitt Peak	Spacewatch	·	630 m	MPC · JPL
659807	2021 AN_{19}	—	December 13, 2010	Mount Lemmon	Mount Lemmon Survey	·	440 m	MPC · JPL
659808	2021 AH_{20}	—	January 21, 2014	Mount Lemmon	Mount Lemmon Survey	·	780 m	MPC · JPL
659809	2021 CH_{14}	—	December 27, 2009	Kitt Peak	Spacewatch	·	700 m	MPC · JPL
659810	2021 CY_{14}	—	February 16, 2010	Mount Lemmon	Mount Lemmon Survey	·	1.0 km	MPC · JPL
659811	2021 CZ_{23}	—	February 7, 2021	Mount Lemmon	Mount Lemmon Survey	·	750 m	MPC · JPL
659812	2021 CY_{26}	—	July 30, 2000	Cerro Tololo	Deep Ecliptic Survey	NYS	840 m	MPC · JPL
659813	2021 CL_{31}	—	July 19, 2015	Haleakala	Pan-STARRS 1	PHO	780 m	MPC · JPL
659814	2021 CO_{31}	—	August 3, 2004	Siding Spring	SSS	·	1.0 km	MPC · JPL
659815	2021 DB_{5}	—	August 8, 2019	Haleakala	Pan-STARRS 1	·	580 m	MPC · JPL
659816	2021 DC_{6}	—	August 12, 2015	Haleakala	Pan-STARRS 1	V	560 m	MPC · JPL
659817	2021 DK_{10}	—	October 9, 2008	Mount Lemmon	Mount Lemmon Survey	·	1.1 km	MPC · JPL
659818	2021 DO_{11}	—	February 3, 2016	Haleakala	Pan-STARRS 1	·	1.4 km	MPC · JPL
659819	2021 EC_{7}	—	May 1, 2017	Mount Lemmon	Mount Lemmon Survey	·	1.1 km	MPC · JPL
659820	2021 EP_{7}	—	March 15, 2007	Kitt Peak	Spacewatch	·	1.8 km	MPC · JPL
659821	2021 EO_{8}	—	February 27, 2012	Haleakala	Pan-STARRS 1	·	1.4 km	MPC · JPL
659822	2021 EH_{10}	—	January 13, 2002	Kitt Peak	Spacewatch	·	1.9 km	MPC · JPL
659823	2021 EE_{12}	—	April 23, 2014	Cerro Tololo	DECam	·	610 m	MPC · JPL
659824	2021 EL_{13}	—	March 2, 2016	Mount Lemmon	Mount Lemmon Survey	·	1.7 km	MPC · JPL
659825	2021 EJ_{17}	—	March 15, 2021	Haleakala	Pan-STARRS 1	·	1.0 km	MPC · JPL
659826	2021 ER_{17}	—	April 28, 2014	Cerro Tololo	DECam	PHO	590 m	MPC · JPL
659827	2021 ER_{18}	—	March 20, 2007	Mount Lemmon	Mount Lemmon Survey	·	590 m	MPC · JPL
659828	2021 EB_{19}	—	April 20, 2014	Kitt Peak	Spacewatch	·	540 m	MPC · JPL
659829	2021 EC_{19}	—	January 29, 2012	Kitt Peak	Spacewatch	·	1.4 km	MPC · JPL
659830	2021 ER_{21}	—	December 27, 2016	Mount Lemmon	Mount Lemmon Survey	·	730 m	MPC · JPL
659831	2021 EL_{24}	—	May 6, 2014	Haleakala	Pan-STARRS 1	·	950 m	MPC · JPL
659832	2021 EK_{26}	—	January 12, 2016	Haleakala	Pan-STARRS 1	·	1.8 km	MPC · JPL
659833	2021 EE_{29}	—	January 28, 2017	Haleakala	Pan-STARRS 1	·	810 m	MPC · JPL
659834	2021 EW_{30}	—	September 24, 2013	Mount Lemmon	Mount Lemmon Survey	·	1.6 km	MPC · JPL
659835	2021 EW_{33}	—	March 6, 2021	Mount Lemmon	Mount Lemmon Survey	·	1.4 km	MPC · JPL
659836	2021 FW_{6}	—	March 20, 2021	Kitt Peak	Bok NEO Survey	·	500 m	MPC · JPL
659837	2021 FK_{8}	—	October 15, 2001	Kitt Peak	Spacewatch	·	1.6 km	MPC · JPL
659838	2021 FF_{10}	—	October 10, 2012	Mount Lemmon	Mount Lemmon Survey	·	540 m	MPC · JPL
659839	2021 FY_{12}	—	June 15, 2018	Haleakala	Pan-STARRS 1	V	470 m	MPC · JPL
659840	2021 FR_{18}	—	January 8, 2016	Haleakala	Pan-STARRS 1	DOR	2.3 km	MPC · JPL
659841	2021 FS_{18}	—	July 26, 2005	Palomar	NEAT	BRG	1.7 km	MPC · JPL
659842	2021 FA_{19}	—	February 10, 2011	Mount Lemmon	Mount Lemmon Survey	·	620 m	MPC · JPL
659843	2021 FB_{20}	—	July 7, 2005	Mauna Kea	Veillet, C.	·	790 m	MPC · JPL
659844	2021 FE_{32}	—	September 10, 2007	Mount Lemmon	Mount Lemmon Survey	·	1.5 km	MPC · JPL
659845	2021 FJ_{33}	—	January 2, 2016	Haleakala	Pan-STARRS 1	·	950 m	MPC · JPL
659846	2021 FQ_{33}	—	April 15, 2012	Haleakala	Pan-STARRS 1	·	1.6 km	MPC · JPL
659847	2021 FR_{33}	—	March 27, 2016	Mount Lemmon	Mount Lemmon Survey	HOF	2.3 km	MPC · JPL
659848	2021 FJ_{38}	—	February 3, 2006	Mauna Kea	P. A. Wiegert, R. Rasmussen	NYS	770 m	MPC · JPL
659849	2021 FF_{39}	—	November 3, 2007	Kitt Peak	Spacewatch	·	2.0 km	MPC · JPL
659850	2021 FK_{46}	—	March 14, 2016	Mount Lemmon	Mount Lemmon Survey	·	1.8 km	MPC · JPL
659851	2021 GB_{12}	—	February 27, 2006	Mount Lemmon	Mount Lemmon Survey	MAS	650 m	MPC · JPL
659852	2021 GT_{13}	—	April 14, 2008	Mount Lemmon	Mount Lemmon Survey	·	1.2 km	MPC · JPL
659853	2021 GB_{14}	—	April 26, 2017	Haleakala	Pan-STARRS 1	·	1.1 km	MPC · JPL
659854	2021 GN_{14}	—	January 21, 2015	Haleakala	Pan-STARRS 1	TIR	2.3 km	MPC · JPL
659855	2021 GC_{15}	—	January 5, 2006	Kitt Peak	Spacewatch	AGN	1.1 km	MPC · JPL
659856	2021 GP_{15}	—	March 30, 2008	Kitt Peak	Spacewatch	·	1.4 km	MPC · JPL
659857	2021 GX_{17}	—	March 23, 2017	Haleakala	Pan-STARRS 1	·	1.0 km	MPC · JPL
659858	2021 GN_{18}	—	January 3, 2016	Haleakala	Pan-STARRS 1	·	1.2 km	MPC · JPL
659859	2021 GG_{25}	—	April 4, 2021	Mount Lemmon	Mount Lemmon Survey	(5)	1.1 km	MPC · JPL
659860	2021 GH_{27}	—	September 30, 2017	Haleakala	Pan-STARRS 1	·	3.3 km	MPC · JPL
659861	2021 GD_{31}	—	October 6, 2008	Mount Lemmon	Mount Lemmon Survey	V	620 m	MPC · JPL
659862	2021 GQ_{31}	—	June 5, 2018	Haleakala	Pan-STARRS 1	·	460 m	MPC · JPL
659863	2021 GX_{34}	—	April 4, 2021	Mount Lemmon	Mount Lemmon Survey	·	610 m	MPC · JPL
659864	2021 GY_{42}	—	September 7, 2018	Mount Lemmon	Mount Lemmon Survey	·	930 m	MPC · JPL
659865	2021 GM_{44}	—	May 8, 2014	Haleakala	Pan-STARRS 1	·	710 m	MPC · JPL
659866	2021 GZ_{52}	—	April 10, 2016	Haleakala	Pan-STARRS 1	·	1.8 km	MPC · JPL
659867	2021 GD_{53}	—	September 15, 2007	Kitt Peak	Spacewatch	EOS	1.6 km	MPC · JPL
659868	2021 GF_{55}	—	April 6, 2014	Mount Lemmon	Mount Lemmon Survey	·	480 m	MPC · JPL
659869	2021 GC_{57}	—	April 29, 2014	Haleakala	Pan-STARRS 1	·	780 m	MPC · JPL
659870	2021 GK_{59}	—	January 22, 2015	Haleakala	Pan-STARRS 1	·	2.0 km	MPC · JPL
659871	2021 GE_{60}	—	February 24, 2017	Haleakala	Pan-STARRS 1	·	770 m	MPC · JPL
659872	2021 GH_{60}	—	October 2, 2006	Mount Lemmon	Mount Lemmon Survey	·	2.3 km	MPC · JPL
659873	2021 GP_{62}	—	March 10, 2016	Haleakala	Pan-STARRS 1	KOR	1.1 km	MPC · JPL
659874	2021 GW_{64}	—	February 8, 2011	Mount Lemmon	Mount Lemmon Survey	·	1.5 km	MPC · JPL
659875	2021 GJ_{66}	—	April 25, 2007	Kitt Peak	Spacewatch	·	550 m	MPC · JPL
659876	2021 GC_{67}	—	October 8, 2012	Mount Lemmon	Mount Lemmon Survey	·	1.7 km	MPC · JPL
659877	2021 GJ_{67}	—	February 11, 2012	Mount Lemmon	Mount Lemmon Survey	·	990 m	MPC · JPL
659878	2021 GD_{74}	—	April 13, 2021	Haleakala	Pan-STARRS 1	·	1.0 km	MPC · JPL
659879	2021 GB_{77}	—	August 9, 2018	ESA OGS	ESA OGS	·	1.4 km	MPC · JPL
659880	2021 GY_{83}	—	January 18, 2008	Kitt Peak	Spacewatch	·	960 m	MPC · JPL
659881	2021 GK_{84}	—	September 13, 2017	Haleakala	Pan-STARRS 1	EOS	1.4 km	MPC · JPL
659882	2021 GL_{86}	—	January 13, 2008	Kitt Peak	Spacewatch	·	850 m	MPC · JPL
659883	2021 GS_{88}	—	January 4, 2016	Haleakala	Pan-STARRS 1	·	960 m	MPC · JPL
659884	2021 GT_{90}	—	April 7, 2021	Haleakala	Pan-STARRS 1	·	1.8 km	MPC · JPL
659885	2021 GJ_{99}	—	December 9, 2012	Mount Lemmon	Mount Lemmon Survey	·	600 m	MPC · JPL
659886	2021 GC_{109}	—	April 10, 2021	Haleakala	Pan-STARRS 1	·	2.5 km	MPC · JPL
659887	2021 GV_{113}	—	January 28, 2015	Haleakala	Pan-STARRS 1	(31811)	2.2 km	MPC · JPL
659888	2021 GY_{113}	—	October 21, 2007	Mount Lemmon	Mount Lemmon Survey	·	2.1 km	MPC · JPL
659889	2021 GV_{122}	—	April 12, 2021	Cerro Tololo	JeongAhn, Y.	res · 4:9	102 km	MPC · JPL
659890	2021 GV_{127}	—	November 6, 2013	Haleakala	Pan-STARRS 1	615	1.1 km	MPC · JPL
659891	2021 GX_{130}	—	August 22, 2017	Haleakala	Pan-STARRS 1	·	2.3 km	MPC · JPL
659892	2021 GL_{137}	—	February 6, 2002	Kitt Peak	Deep Ecliptic Survey	·	1.6 km	MPC · JPL
659893	2021 GP_{139}	—	August 12, 2013	Haleakala	Pan-STARRS 1	·	1.4 km	MPC · JPL
659894	2021 GW_{147}	—	August 12, 2012	Siding Spring	SSS	·	630 m	MPC · JPL
659895	2021 GW_{157}	—	January 16, 2016	Haleakala	Pan-STARRS 1	·	1.4 km	MPC · JPL
659896	2021 GN_{159}	—	April 10, 2021	Haleakala	Pan-STARRS 1	·	990 m	MPC · JPL
659897	2021 GQ_{178}	—	May 3, 2016	Mount Lemmon	Mount Lemmon Survey	·	2.2 km	MPC · JPL
659898	2021 HH_{3}	—	June 2, 2016	Mount Lemmon	Mount Lemmon Survey	·	1.6 km	MPC · JPL
659899	2021 HZ_{5}	—	April 17, 2021	Haleakala	Pan-STARRS 1	·	2.0 km	MPC · JPL
659900	2021 HW_{9}	—	September 18, 2009	Kitt Peak	Spacewatch	·	1.2 km	MPC · JPL

== 659901–660000 ==
back to top

Designation			Discovery			Properties		Ref
Permanent	Provisional	Named after	Date	Site	Discoverer(s)	Category	Diam.	Ref
659901	2021 HW_{11}	—	September 23, 2008	Kitt Peak	Spacewatch	·	1.3 km	MPC · JPL
659902	2021 HM_{13}	—	June 20, 2017	Haleakala	Pan-STARRS 1	KON	2.1 km	MPC · JPL
659903	2021 HQ_{15}	—	October 11, 2012	Mount Lemmon	Mount Lemmon Survey	·	1.5 km	MPC · JPL
659904	2021 HT_{15}	—	August 13, 2017	Haleakala	Pan-STARRS 1	·	1.7 km	MPC · JPL
659905	2021 HK_{20}	—	April 16, 2021	Haleakala	Pan-STARRS 1	·	750 m	MPC · JPL
659906	2021 HL_{24}	—	April 17, 2021	Haleakala	Pan-STARRS 1	·	2.2 km	MPC · JPL
659907	2021 HE_{26}	—	May 27, 2009	Mauna Kea	P. A. Wiegert	VER	2.1 km	MPC · JPL
659908	2021 HJ_{39}	—	January 28, 2015	Haleakala	Pan-STARRS 1	EOS	1.3 km	MPC · JPL
659909	2021 JJ_{15}	—	July 1, 2016	Haleakala	Pan-STARRS 1	·	2.2 km	MPC · JPL
659910	2021 JL_{18}	—	May 3, 2021	Haleakala	Pan-STARRS 1	EOS	1.4 km	MPC · JPL
659911	2021 JO_{25}	—	September 17, 2017	Haleakala	Pan-STARRS 1	·	1.8 km	MPC · JPL
659912	2021 JT_{25}	—	October 6, 2012	Charleston	R. Holmes	·	2.7 km	MPC · JPL
659913	2021 JW_{30}	—	October 22, 2012	Haleakala	Pan-STARRS 1	·	2.2 km	MPC · JPL
659914	2021 JE_{31}	—	September 17, 2017	Haleakala	Pan-STARRS 1	VER	2.0 km	MPC · JPL
659915	2021 JW_{35}	—	September 18, 2011	Mount Lemmon	Mount Lemmon Survey	THM	1.6 km	MPC · JPL
659916	2021 JN_{42}	—	October 25, 2012	Mount Lemmon	Mount Lemmon Survey	·	2.2 km	MPC · JPL
659917	2021 JG_{52}	—	May 9, 2021	Mount Lemmon	Mount Lemmon Survey	·	1.6 km	MPC · JPL
659918	2021 KF_{9}	—	April 19, 2015	Cerro Tololo-DECam	DECam	·	2.6 km	MPC · JPL
659919	2021 KD_{10}	—	January 25, 2014	Haleakala	Pan-STARRS 1	·	2.1 km	MPC · JPL
659920	2021 LG	—	April 27, 2017	Haleakala	Pan-STARRS 1	·	1.9 km	MPC · JPL
659921	2021 LO_{4}	—	April 23, 2015	Haleakala	Pan-STARRS 1	·	2.2 km	MPC · JPL
659922	2021 LT_{4}	—	March 7, 2003	Apache Point	SDSS Collaboration	·	2.8 km	MPC · JPL
659923	2021 LD_{14}	—	June 5, 2021	Haleakala	Pan-STARRS 1	·	1.4 km	MPC · JPL
659924	2021 LE_{25}	—	August 30, 2016	Haleakala	Pan-STARRS 1	·	2.2 km	MPC · JPL
659925	2021 LH_{38}	—	November 1, 2006	Mount Lemmon	Mount Lemmon Survey	·	2.4 km	MPC · JPL
659926	2021 NW_{15}	—	February 22, 2014	Kitt Peak	Spacewatch	·	1.9 km	MPC · JPL
659927	2021 NG_{16}	—	September 10, 2016	Mount Lemmon	Mount Lemmon Survey	·	2.3 km	MPC · JPL
659928	2021 NX_{23}	—	January 8, 2019	Haleakala	Pan-STARRS 1	·	2.4 km	MPC · JPL
659929	2021 NZ_{23}	—	April 23, 2014	Cerro Tololo	DECam	VER	2.1 km	MPC · JPL
659930	2021 PC_{4}	—	January 9, 2013	Catalina	CSS	L4	8.7 km	MPC · JPL
659931	2021 PE_{26}	—	February 11, 2008	Mount Lemmon	Mount Lemmon Survey	·	2.0 km	MPC · JPL
659932	2021 PK_{33}	—	April 18, 2015	Cerro Tololo-DECam	DECam	·	1.4 km	MPC · JPL
659933	2021 PA_{34}	—	May 27, 2014	Haleakala	Pan-STARRS 1	·	2.4 km	MPC · JPL
659934	2021 PZ_{51}	—	January 4, 2019	Haleakala	Pan-STARRS 1	EOS	1.6 km	MPC · JPL
659935	2021 PJ_{154}	—	August 7, 2021	Haleakala	Pan-STARRS 1	EOS	1.3 km	MPC · JPL
659936	2021 PV_{173}	—	August 9, 2021	Haleakala	Pan-STARRS 1	·	2.3 km	MPC · JPL
659937	2021 PR_{174}	—	December 22, 2012	Haleakala	Pan-STARRS 1	·	2.1 km	MPC · JPL
659938	2021 QF_{7}	—	October 20, 2017	Mount Lemmon	Mount Lemmon Survey	·	1.6 km	MPC · JPL
659939	2021 QQ_{16}	—	November 10, 2016	Haleakala	Pan-STARRS 1	·	1.8 km	MPC · JPL
659940	2021 QN_{27}	—	March 2, 2008	Mount Lemmon	Mount Lemmon Survey	EOS	1.6 km	MPC · JPL
659941	2021 QW_{95}	—	September 6, 2016	Mount Lemmon	Mount Lemmon Survey	·	2.2 km	MPC · JPL
659942	2021 QC_{96}	—	December 12, 2006	Mount Lemmon	Mount Lemmon Survey	·	2.3 km	MPC · JPL
659943	2021 RY_{25}	—	June 22, 2015	Haleakala	Pan-STARRS 1	·	1.7 km	MPC · JPL
659944	2021 RZ_{26}	—	April 28, 2014	Cerro Tololo-DECam	DECam	·	2.2 km	MPC · JPL
659945	2021 RT_{108}	—	April 20, 2007	Mount Lemmon	Mount Lemmon Survey	·	1.4 km	MPC · JPL
659946	2021 RP_{120}	—	October 17, 2008	Kitt Peak	Spacewatch	·	1.2 km	MPC · JPL
659947	2021 RW_{152}	—	September 9, 2021	Haleakala	Pan-STARRS 2	·	1.2 km	MPC · JPL
659948	2021 SO_{41}	—	February 16, 2015	Haleakala	Pan-STARRS 1	L4	6.4 km	MPC · JPL
659949	2021 TC_{53}	—	April 18, 2015	Cerro Tololo-DECam	DECam	L4	5.8 km	MPC · JPL
659950	2021 TV_{60}	—	November 8, 2010	Mount Lemmon	Mount Lemmon Survey	L4	5.8 km	MPC · JPL
659951	2021 UK_{1}	—	September 18, 2020	Haleakala	Pan-STARRS 1	L4	7.5 km	MPC · JPL
659952	2021 US_{11}	—	October 31, 2021	Haleakala	Pan-STARRS 1	AMO	330 m	MPC · JPL
659953	2021 UX_{87}	—	October 24, 2009	Kitt Peak	Spacewatch	L4	6.2 km	MPC · JPL
659954	2021 VD_{12}	—	October 24, 2009	Kitt Peak	Spacewatch	L4	6.6 km	MPC · JPL
659955	2022 AC_{30}	—	January 8, 2022	Mount Lemmon	Mount Lemmon Survey	AMO	500 m	MPC · JPL
659956	2022 CH_{22}	—	October 31, 2007	Mount Lemmon	Mount Lemmon Survey	·	540 m	MPC · JPL
659957	2022 EK_{9}	—	March 10, 2008	Mount Lemmon	Mount Lemmon Survey	·	780 m	MPC · JPL
659958	2022 KU_{11}	—	December 14, 2018	Mount Lemmon	Mount Lemmon Survey	·	2.2 km	MPC · JPL
659959	2022 KO_{16}	—	October 21, 2015	Haleakala	Pan-STARRS 1	·	700 m	MPC · JPL
659960	2022 LA_{4}	—	March 30, 2016	Cerro Tololo-DECam	DECam	·	1.6 km	MPC · JPL
659961	2022 LU_{8}	—	February 4, 2019	Haleakala	Pan-STARRS 1	·	3.1 km	MPC · JPL
659962	2022 MW_{5}	—	June 28, 2022	Haleakala	Pan-STARRS 2	·	1.8 km	MPC · JPL
659963	2022 NM_{11}	—	July 10, 2022	Mount Lemmon	Mount Lemmon Survey	TIR	2.7 km	MPC · JPL
659964	2022 OF_{18}	—	January 7, 2009	Kitt Peak	Spacewatch	EOS	1.3 km	MPC · JPL
659965	2022 QA_{10}	—	September 28, 2008	Mount Lemmon	Mount Lemmon Survey	·	1.5 km	MPC · JPL
659966	2022 QJ_{13}	—	January 9, 2014	Haleakala	Pan-STARRS 1	·	2.3 km	MPC · JPL
659967	2022 QV_{19}	—	November 27, 2013	Haleakala	Pan-STARRS 1	·	1.7 km	MPC · JPL
659968	2022 QF_{34}	—	May 18, 2015	Haleakala	Pan-STARRS 1	·	2.2 km	MPC · JPL
659969	2022 QY_{40}	—	September 3, 2013	Haleakala	Pan-STARRS 1	·	1.3 km	MPC · JPL
659970	2022 QQ_{88}	—	February 2, 2009	Kitt Peak	Spacewatch	·	1.7 km	MPC · JPL
659971	2022 QU_{89}	—	January 20, 2015	Haleakala	Pan-STARRS 1	HOF	1.8 km	MPC · JPL
659972	2022 QM_{91}	—	July 13, 2016	Mount Lemmon	Mount Lemmon Survey	·	2.1 km	MPC · JPL
659973	2022 QC_{100}	—	October 17, 2012	Mount Lemmon	Mount Lemmon Survey	EOS	1.1 km	MPC · JPL
659974	2022 QP_{112}	—	May 1, 2016	Cerro Tololo-DECam	DECam	·	1.6 km	MPC · JPL
659975	2022 QQ_{175}	—	November 29, 2014	Mount Lemmon	Mount Lemmon Survey	·	1.1 km	MPC · JPL
659976	2022 QR_{194}	—	October 9, 2007	Mount Lemmon	Mount Lemmon Survey	·	1.1 km	MPC · JPL
659977	2022 QF_{239}	—	March 18, 2010	Mount Lemmon	Mount Lemmon Survey	KOR	1.0 km	MPC · JPL
659978	2022 QK_{258}	—	October 20, 2007	Mount Lemmon	Mount Lemmon Survey	·	1.9 km	MPC · JPL
659979	2022 QH_{265}	—	September 14, 2007	Mount Lemmon	Mount Lemmon Survey	3:2 · SHU	3.5 km	MPC · JPL
659980	2022 RF_{34}	—	November 7, 2012	Haleakala	Pan-STARRS 1	·	1.7 km	MPC · JPL
659981	2022 RB_{42}	—	July 9, 2016	Haleakala	Pan-STARRS 1	EOS	1.3 km	MPC · JPL
659982	2022 RA_{44}	—	December 5, 2007	Kitt Peak	Spacewatch	·	2.1 km	MPC · JPL
659983	2022 RG_{46}	—	August 29, 2016	Mount Lemmon	Mount Lemmon Survey	·	2.5 km	MPC · JPL
659984	2022 RY_{54}	—	March 29, 2019	Mount Lemmon	Mount Lemmon Survey	SYL	3.1 km	MPC · JPL
659985	2022 SW_{58}	—	November 18, 2017	Haleakala	Pan-STARRS 1	EOS	1.2 km	MPC · JPL
659986	2022 SY_{68}	—	April 27, 2020	Haleakala	Pan-STARRS 1	·	2.4 km	MPC · JPL
659987	2022 SX_{74}	—	July 6, 2016	Haleakala	Pan-STARRS 1	·	2.1 km	MPC · JPL
659988	2022 SR_{78}	—	September 7, 2008	Mount Lemmon	Mount Lemmon Survey	·	1.3 km	MPC · JPL
659989	2022 SC_{81}	—	February 8, 2013	Haleakala	Pan-STARRS 1	·	2.1 km	MPC · JPL
659990	2022 SZ_{97}	—	January 26, 2011	Mount Lemmon	Mount Lemmon Survey	·	1.3 km	MPC · JPL
659991	2022 SL_{105}	—	October 2, 2008	Mount Lemmon	Mount Lemmon Survey	·	1.5 km	MPC · JPL
659992	2022 SR_{105}	—	July 14, 2016	Haleakala	Pan-STARRS 1	·	1.6 km	MPC · JPL
659993	2022 SD_{110}	—	October 18, 2006	Kitt Peak	Spacewatch	·	1.6 km	MPC · JPL
659994	2022 SR_{114}	—	October 9, 2013	Mount Lemmon	Mount Lemmon Survey	·	1.4 km	MPC · JPL
659995	2022 SM_{145}	—	September 29, 2011	Mount Lemmon	Mount Lemmon Survey	EOS	1.3 km	MPC · JPL
659996	2022 SO_{200}	—	February 16, 2015	Haleakala	Pan-STARRS 1	KOR	1.0 km	MPC · JPL
659997	2022 TY_{12}	—	March 15, 2010	WISE	WISE	·	2.7 km	MPC · JPL
659998	2022 UR_{62}	—	April 5, 2016	Haleakala	Pan-STARRS 1	·	1.0 km	MPC · JPL
659999	2023 QJ_{88}	—	January 28, 2014	Mount Lemmon	Mount Lemmon Survey	·	2.5 km	MPC · JPL
660000	2023 SE_{20}	—	January 31, 2009	Mount Lemmon	Mount Lemmon Survey	·	1.9 km	MPC · JPL

back to top

== Meaning of names ==
As minor planet discoveries are confirmed, they are given a permanent number by the IAU's Minor Planet Center (MPC), and the discoverers can then submit names for them, following the IAU's naming conventions. The list below concerns those minor planets in the specified number-range that have received names, and explains the meanings of those names.

Official naming citations of newly named small Solar System bodies are approved and published in a bulletin by IAU's Working Group for Small Bodies Nomenclature (WGSBN). Before May 2021, citations were published in MPC's Minor Planet Circulars for many decades. Recent citations can also be found on the JPL Small-Body Database (SBDB). Until his death in 2016, German astronomer Lutz D. Schmadel compiled these citations into the Dictionary of Minor Planet Names (DMP) and regularly updated the collection.

Based on Paul Herget's The Names of the Minor Planets, Schmadel also researched the unclear origin of numerous asteroids, most of which had been named prior to World War II. This article incorporates text from this source, which is in the public domain: SBDB New namings may only be added to this list below after official publication as the preannouncement of names is condemned. The WGSBN publishes a comprehensive guideline for the naming rules of non-cometary small Solar System bodies.

Named minor planet	Provisional	This minor planet was named for...	Ref · Catalog
659267 Cristianstancu	2018 VV_{162}	Cristian Mircea Stancu, Romanian engineer.	IAU · 659267
