= List of minor planets: 730001–731000 =

The following is a partial list of minor planets, running from minor-planet number 730001 through 731000, inclusive. The primary data for this and other partial lists is based on JPL's "Small-Body Orbital Elements" and data available from the Minor Planet Center. Critical list information is also provided by the MPC, unless otherwise specified from Lowell Observatory. A detailed description of the table's columns and additional sources are given on the main page including a complete list of every page in this series, and a statistical break-up on the dynamical classification of minor planets.

Also see the summary list of all named bodies in numerical and alphabetical order, and the corresponding naming citations for the number range of this particular list. New namings may only be added to this list after official publication, as the preannouncement of names is condemned by the Working Group for Small Bodies Nomenclature of the International Astronomical Union.

Near-Earth obj.	MBA (inner)	MBA (outer)	Centaur
Mars-crosser	MBA (middle)	Jupiter trojan	Trans-Neptunian obj.
Unclassified

== 730001–730100 ==
Designation			Discovery			Properties		Ref
Permanent	Provisional	Named after	Date	Site	Discoverer(s)	Category	Diam.	Ref
730001	2011 UW_{129}	—	September 27, 2011	Mount Lemmon	Mount Lemmon Survey	·	1.1 km	MPC · JPL
730002	2011 UR_{130}	—	December 21, 2003	Kitt Peak	Spacewatch	·	2.4 km	MPC · JPL
730003	2011 UA_{132}	—	July 21, 2006	Mount Lemmon	Mount Lemmon Survey	·	1.2 km	MPC · JPL
730004	2011 UB_{132}	—	September 28, 2011	Catalina	CSS	·	1.7 km	MPC · JPL
730005	2011 UO_{132}	—	August 19, 2006	Kitt Peak	Spacewatch	·	1.4 km	MPC · JPL
730006	2011 US_{132}	—	February 2, 2008	Kitt Peak	Spacewatch	·	1.5 km	MPC · JPL
730007	2011 UU_{133}	—	May 14, 2009	Mount Lemmon	Mount Lemmon Survey	·	3.0 km	MPC · JPL
730008	2011 UX_{133}	—	January 28, 2004	Apache Point	SDSS Collaboration	·	2.1 km	MPC · JPL
730009	2011 UT_{135}	—	September 28, 2011	Mount Lemmon	Mount Lemmon Survey	AGN	900 m	MPC · JPL
730010	2011 UV_{138}	—	October 22, 2011	Kitt Peak	Spacewatch	·	1.4 km	MPC · JPL
730011	2011 UA_{140}	—	October 23, 2011	Kitt Peak	Spacewatch	GEF	1.2 km	MPC · JPL
730012	2011 UC_{140}	—	October 23, 2011	Kitt Peak	Spacewatch	·	1.3 km	MPC · JPL
730013	2011 UR_{142}	—	December 5, 2007	Mount Lemmon	Mount Lemmon Survey	·	1.4 km	MPC · JPL
730014	2011 UK_{143}	—	May 9, 2004	Kitt Peak	Spacewatch	·	3.0 km	MPC · JPL
730015	2011 UQ_{145}	—	April 14, 2004	Palomar	NEAT	·	1.9 km	MPC · JPL
730016	2011 UY_{147}	—	September 27, 2011	Črni Vrh	Matičič, S.	·	1.7 km	MPC · JPL
730017	2011 UV_{149}	—	January 31, 2004	Apache Point	SDSS Collaboration	·	1.8 km	MPC · JPL
730018	2011 UQ_{151}	—	October 7, 2002	Haleakala	NEAT	·	2.3 km	MPC · JPL
730019	2011 UY_{155}	—	February 28, 2008	Mount Lemmon	Mount Lemmon Survey	·	1.5 km	MPC · JPL
730020	2011 UM_{158}	—	October 10, 2002	Palomar	NEAT	·	1.7 km	MPC · JPL
730021	2011 UO_{159}	—	October 18, 2011	Mount Lemmon	Mount Lemmon Survey	·	1.2 km	MPC · JPL
730022	2011 UL_{166}	—	May 17, 2010	WISE	WISE	·	2.8 km	MPC · JPL
730023	2011 UN_{167}	—	September 19, 1998	Apache Point	SDSS Collaboration	·	1.3 km	MPC · JPL
730024	2011 UX_{168}	—	October 10, 2002	Apache Point	SDSS Collaboration	·	3.2 km	MPC · JPL
730025	2011 UY_{169}	—	October 20, 2007	Kitt Peak	Spacewatch	·	1.5 km	MPC · JPL
730026	2011 UE_{170}	—	December 3, 2002	Palomar	NEAT	·	3.1 km	MPC · JPL
730027	2011 UF_{178}	—	August 20, 2000	Kitt Peak	Spacewatch	·	960 m	MPC · JPL
730028	2011 UU_{182}	—	April 22, 2010	WISE	WISE	·	2.4 km	MPC · JPL
730029	2011 UC_{187}	—	April 30, 2010	WISE	WISE	·	3.7 km	MPC · JPL
730030	2011 UJ_{189}	—	August 29, 2005	Palomar	NEAT	·	3.6 km	MPC · JPL
730031	2011 UM_{200}	—	June 8, 2010	WISE	WISE	·	3.1 km	MPC · JPL
730032	2011 UO_{205}	—	September 13, 2007	Mount Lemmon	Mount Lemmon Survey	MAS	570 m	MPC · JPL
730033	2011 UR_{213}	—	April 17, 2005	Kitt Peak	Spacewatch	EUN	1.2 km	MPC · JPL
730034	2011 UX_{214}	—	October 24, 2011	Mount Lemmon	Mount Lemmon Survey	AGN	920 m	MPC · JPL
730035	2011 UU_{218}	—	October 19, 2011	Mount Lemmon	Mount Lemmon Survey	·	1.3 km	MPC · JPL
730036	2011 UM_{222}	—	March 7, 2009	Mount Lemmon	Mount Lemmon Survey	·	1.7 km	MPC · JPL
730037	2011 UU_{222}	—	October 24, 2011	Mount Lemmon	Mount Lemmon Survey	KOR	990 m	MPC · JPL
730038	2011 UJ_{226}	—	March 20, 2004	Kitt Peak	Spacewatch	·	2.0 km	MPC · JPL
730039	2011 UW_{226}	—	September 21, 2011	Kitt Peak	Spacewatch	NYS	880 m	MPC · JPL
730040	2011 UP_{235}	—	October 24, 2011	Haleakala	Pan-STARRS 1	·	510 m	MPC · JPL
730041	2011 UX_{236}	—	March 1, 2009	Kitt Peak	Spacewatch	NEM	1.9 km	MPC · JPL
730042	2011 UK_{239}	—	April 28, 2010	WISE	WISE	·	2.9 km	MPC · JPL
730043	2011 UT_{241}	—	October 25, 2011	Haleakala	Pan-STARRS 1	HOF	2.3 km	MPC · JPL
730044	2011 UA_{243}	—	October 5, 2002	Apache Point	SDSS Collaboration	·	1.0 km	MPC · JPL
730045	2011 UO_{244}	—	August 6, 2002	Palomar	NEAT	·	2.2 km	MPC · JPL
730046	2011 UU_{245}	—	October 26, 2011	Kitt Peak	Spacewatch	·	1.5 km	MPC · JPL
730047	2011 UX_{256}	—	August 27, 2005	Palomar	NEAT	EUP	4.3 km	MPC · JPL
730048	2011 UH_{257}	—	August 29, 2006	Kitt Peak	Spacewatch	AGN	810 m	MPC · JPL
730049	2011 UY_{257}	—	October 23, 2011	Kitt Peak	Spacewatch	·	1.2 km	MPC · JPL
730050	2011 UY_{259}	—	April 10, 2005	Kitt Peak	Deep Ecliptic Survey	·	1.0 km	MPC · JPL
730051	2011 UF_{262}	—	December 19, 2007	Mount Lemmon	Mount Lemmon Survey	MRX	830 m	MPC · JPL
730052	2011 UY_{264}	—	September 19, 2006	Eskridge	G. Hug	·	1.8 km	MPC · JPL
730053	2011 UV_{269}	—	October 31, 2002	Kitt Peak	Spacewatch	GEF	1.0 km	MPC · JPL
730054	2011 UG_{271}	—	October 4, 1999	Kitt Peak	Spacewatch	LUT	5.2 km	MPC · JPL
730055	2011 UR_{279}	—	August 4, 2004	Palomar	NEAT	·	4.7 km	MPC · JPL
730056	2011 UD_{286}	—	October 28, 2011	Zelenchukskaya	T. V. Krjačko	·	1.9 km	MPC · JPL
730057	2011 UC_{290}	—	April 12, 2010	WISE	WISE	URS	2.5 km	MPC · JPL
730058	2011 UL_{295}	—	December 20, 2001	Apache Point	SDSS Collaboration	·	2.6 km	MPC · JPL
730059	2011 UE_{296}	—	October 21, 2011	Kitt Peak	Spacewatch	MAS	530 m	MPC · JPL
730060	2011 UL_{296}	—	February 26, 2009	Kitt Peak	Spacewatch	(17392)	1.4 km	MPC · JPL
730061	2011 UB_{297}	—	September 27, 2006	Mount Lemmon	Mount Lemmon Survey	·	1.6 km	MPC · JPL
730062	2011 UP_{298}	—	October 21, 2011	Kitt Peak	Spacewatch	EUN	1.1 km	MPC · JPL
730063	2011 UK_{302}	—	May 1, 2010	WISE	WISE	·	3.2 km	MPC · JPL
730064	2011 UV_{303}	—	October 31, 2011	Mayhill-ISON	L. Elenin	EUN	1.0 km	MPC · JPL
730065	2011 UR_{304}	—	September 30, 2011	Kitt Peak	Spacewatch	NEM	1.9 km	MPC · JPL
730066	2011 UZ_{306}	—	October 27, 2011	Catalina	CSS	·	2.3 km	MPC · JPL
730067	2011 UF_{313}	—	November 12, 2007	Mount Lemmon	Mount Lemmon Survey	·	1.6 km	MPC · JPL
730068	2011 UP_{318}	—	October 30, 2011	Mount Lemmon	Mount Lemmon Survey	·	1.3 km	MPC · JPL
730069	2011 UU_{318}	—	September 25, 2006	Kitt Peak	Spacewatch	·	1.5 km	MPC · JPL
730070	2011 UM_{321}	—	May 8, 2005	Kitt Peak	Spacewatch	·	2.1 km	MPC · JPL
730071	2011 UO_{321}	—	March 10, 2008	Kitt Peak	Spacewatch	·	3.7 km	MPC · JPL
730072	2011 UF_{322}	—	April 17, 2010	Mount Lemmon	Mount Lemmon Survey	·	1.4 km	MPC · JPL
730073	2011 UU_{327}	—	March 27, 2008	Mount Lemmon	Mount Lemmon Survey	·	3.6 km	MPC · JPL
730074	2011 UF_{328}	—	January 18, 2004	Kitt Peak	Spacewatch	·	1.1 km	MPC · JPL
730075	2011 UO_{330}	—	October 23, 2011	Haleakala	Pan-STARRS 1	·	1.9 km	MPC · JPL
730076	2011 UJ_{332}	—	October 26, 2011	Mayhill-ISON	L. Elenin	·	1.1 km	MPC · JPL
730077	2011 UE_{333}	—	October 28, 2011	Mount Lemmon	Mount Lemmon Survey	·	1.5 km	MPC · JPL
730078	2011 UG_{337}	—	May 4, 2007	Haleakala	Faulkes Telescope Project	·	1.3 km	MPC · JPL
730079	2011 UZ_{348}	—	August 26, 2005	Palomar	NEAT	·	3.3 km	MPC · JPL
730080	2011 UP_{349}	—	May 16, 2010	WISE	WISE	·	3.0 km	MPC · JPL
730081	2011 UT_{356}	—	September 4, 2002	Anderson Mesa	LONEOS	·	1.3 km	MPC · JPL
730082	2011 UX_{356}	—	October 5, 2002	Apache Point	SDSS Collaboration	·	1.3 km	MPC · JPL
730083	2011 UZ_{358}	—	April 24, 2010	WISE	WISE	·	1.9 km	MPC · JPL
730084	2011 UG_{360}	—	September 30, 2011	Kitt Peak	Spacewatch	·	2.4 km	MPC · JPL
730085	2011 UM_{360}	—	October 21, 2011	Kitt Peak	Spacewatch	HOF	1.9 km	MPC · JPL
730086	2011 UF_{366}	—	October 22, 2011	Mount Lemmon	Mount Lemmon Survey	AGN	920 m	MPC · JPL
730087	2011 UR_{368}	—	October 18, 2001	Palomar	NEAT	·	3.3 km	MPC · JPL
730088	2011 UV_{369}	—	September 3, 2000	Apache Point	SDSS Collaboration	TEL	1.4 km	MPC · JPL
730089	2011 UY_{369}	—	November 17, 1998	Kitt Peak	Spacewatch	HNS	1 km	MPC · JPL
730090	2011 UH_{375}	—	October 23, 2011	Mount Lemmon	Mount Lemmon Survey	EOS	1.5 km	MPC · JPL
730091	2011 UL_{377}	—	December 19, 2007	Kitt Peak	Spacewatch	·	1.2 km	MPC · JPL
730092	2011 UK_{385}	—	October 19, 2011	Mount Lemmon	Mount Lemmon Survey	WIT	810 m	MPC · JPL
730093	2011 UD_{388}	—	October 25, 2011	Haleakala	Pan-STARRS 1	·	1.4 km	MPC · JPL
730094	2011 UU_{388}	—	November 17, 2006	Mount Lemmon	Mount Lemmon Survey	·	2.4 km	MPC · JPL
730095	2011 UQ_{391}	—	November 20, 2006	Kitt Peak	Spacewatch	·	3.3 km	MPC · JPL
730096	2011 UO_{395}	—	September 1, 2002	Palomar	NEAT	·	1.4 km	MPC · JPL
730097	2011 UO_{400}	—	October 24, 2011	Haleakala	Pan-STARRS 1	H	590 m	MPC · JPL
730098	2011 UJ_{406}	—	October 28, 2006	Catalina	CSS	EOS	2.3 km	MPC · JPL
730099	2011 UG_{408}	—	October 21, 2011	Palomar	Palomar Transient Factory	EUN	970 m	MPC · JPL
730100	2011 UK_{415}	—	October 26, 2011	Haleakala	Pan-STARRS 1	AGN	950 m	MPC · JPL

== 730101–730200 ==
back to top

Designation			Discovery			Properties		Ref
Permanent	Provisional	Named after	Date	Site	Discoverer(s)	Category	Diam.	Ref
730101	2011 UQ_{418}	—	November 8, 2007	Kitt Peak	Spacewatch	·	1.8 km	MPC · JPL
730102	2011 UJ_{419}	—	June 24, 2010	WISE	WISE	·	4.7 km	MPC · JPL
730103	2011 UX_{421}	—	April 28, 2010	WISE	WISE	·	3.9 km	MPC · JPL
730104	2011 UN_{422}	—	October 3, 2014	Mount Lemmon	Mount Lemmon Survey	·	620 m	MPC · JPL
730105	2011 UP_{423}	—	September 23, 2011	Haleakala	Pan-STARRS 1	·	1.3 km	MPC · JPL
730106	2011 UE_{424}	—	April 22, 2010	WISE	WISE	·	1.3 km	MPC · JPL
730107	2011 UU_{424}	—	April 29, 2010	WISE	WISE	·	2.4 km	MPC · JPL
730108	2011 UZ_{425}	—	April 26, 2010	WISE	WISE	·	1.9 km	MPC · JPL
730109	2011 UN_{427}	—	February 26, 2014	Haleakala	Pan-STARRS 1	EOS	1.5 km	MPC · JPL
730110	2011 UV_{438}	—	April 8, 2010	WISE	WISE	·	2.7 km	MPC · JPL
730111	2011 UW_{442}	—	April 1, 2010	WISE	WISE	·	2.2 km	MPC · JPL
730112	2011 UA_{445}	—	December 17, 2007	Mount Lemmon	Mount Lemmon Survey	·	1.5 km	MPC · JPL
730113	2011 UQ_{448}	—	October 23, 2011	Haleakala	Pan-STARRS 1	·	2.4 km	MPC · JPL
730114	2011 US_{449}	—	October 19, 2011	Mount Lemmon	Mount Lemmon Survey	·	1.9 km	MPC · JPL
730115	2011 UN_{452}	—	October 22, 2011	Kitt Peak	Spacewatch	·	1.3 km	MPC · JPL
730116	2011 UZ_{453}	—	October 24, 2011	Haleakala	Pan-STARRS 1	·	1.3 km	MPC · JPL
730117	2011 UA_{456}	—	March 2, 2009	Mount Lemmon	Mount Lemmon Survey	·	1.2 km	MPC · JPL
730118	2011 UG_{461}	—	October 26, 2011	Haleakala	Pan-STARRS 1	·	1.6 km	MPC · JPL
730119	2011 UN_{464}	—	October 26, 2011	Haleakala	Pan-STARRS 1	·	780 m	MPC · JPL
730120	2011 UQ_{464}	—	October 25, 2011	Haleakala	Pan-STARRS 1	·	1.3 km	MPC · JPL
730121	2011 UN_{465}	—	October 26, 2011	Haleakala	Pan-STARRS 1	AGN	950 m	MPC · JPL
730122	2011 UA_{467}	—	October 23, 2011	Taunus	E. Schwab, R. Kling	·	1.1 km	MPC · JPL
730123	2011 UB_{482}	—	October 25, 2011	Haleakala	Pan-STARRS 1	EOS	1.5 km	MPC · JPL
730124	2011 UM_{485}	—	October 24, 2011	Haleakala	Pan-STARRS 1	·	1.2 km	MPC · JPL
730125	2011 UF_{494}	—	January 20, 2009	Kitt Peak	Spacewatch	·	990 m	MPC · JPL
730126	2011 UW_{495}	—	October 24, 2011	Haleakala	Pan-STARRS 1	·	1.2 km	MPC · JPL
730127	2011 VY_{1}	—	May 9, 2010	WISE	WISE	·	3.2 km	MPC · JPL
730128	2011 VA_{5}	—	September 28, 2011	Mount Lemmon	Mount Lemmon Survey	·	1.2 km	MPC · JPL
730129	2011 VH_{6}	—	October 20, 2011	Mount Lemmon	Mount Lemmon Survey	VER	2.5 km	MPC · JPL
730130	2011 VY_{6}	—	October 28, 2011	Mount Lemmon	Mount Lemmon Survey	·	1.6 km	MPC · JPL
730131	2011 VC_{19}	—	December 20, 2006	Palomar	NEAT	·	3.9 km	MPC · JPL
730132	2011 VS_{20}	—	September 27, 2006	Kitt Peak	Spacewatch	AGN	1.1 km	MPC · JPL
730133	2011 VJ_{26}	—	November 2, 2011	Mount Lemmon	Mount Lemmon Survey	·	2.4 km	MPC · JPL
730134	2011 VT_{27}	—	February 11, 2010	WISE	WISE	·	1.2 km	MPC · JPL
730135	2011 VA_{28}	—	November 27, 2006	Kitt Peak	Spacewatch	·	3.1 km	MPC · JPL
730136	2011 VV_{30}	—	November 3, 2011	Kitt Peak	Spacewatch	·	2.6 km	MPC · JPL
730137	2011 VP_{35}	—	November 2, 2011	Mount Lemmon	Mount Lemmon Survey	GEF	1.0 km	MPC · JPL
730138	2011 WH	—	October 1, 2011	Kitt Peak	Spacewatch	·	1.7 km	MPC · JPL
730139	2011 WF_{5}	—	November 18, 2011	Mount Lemmon	Mount Lemmon Survey	·	1.7 km	MPC · JPL
730140	2011 WF_{6}	—	November 16, 2011	Mount Lemmon	Mount Lemmon Survey	AEO	930 m	MPC · JPL
730141	2011 WQ_{8}	—	April 18, 2009	Mount Lemmon	Mount Lemmon Survey	·	1.5 km	MPC · JPL
730142	2011 WY_{8}	—	June 6, 2010	WISE	WISE	·	2.5 km	MPC · JPL
730143	2011 WT_{13}	—	November 17, 2011	Kitt Peak	Spacewatch	·	500 m	MPC · JPL
730144	2011 WD_{16}	—	November 16, 2011	Kitt Peak	Spacewatch	·	1.4 km	MPC · JPL
730145	2011 WT_{17}	—	October 10, 2002	Palomar	NEAT	·	1.6 km	MPC · JPL
730146	2011 WT_{21}	—	January 13, 2008	Kitt Peak	Spacewatch	NEM	1.6 km	MPC · JPL
730147	2011 WU_{23}	—	January 14, 2008	Kitt Peak	Spacewatch	·	1.5 km	MPC · JPL
730148	2011 WV_{26}	—	September 15, 2006	Kitt Peak	Spacewatch	·	1.4 km	MPC · JPL
730149	2011 WC_{31}	—	October 19, 2003	Kitt Peak	Spacewatch	T_{j} (2.99) · 3:2	5.5 km	MPC · JPL
730150	2011 WZ_{37}	—	October 1, 2006	Kitt Peak	Spacewatch	AGN	950 m	MPC · JPL
730151	2011 WQ_{38}	—	February 15, 2005	La Silla	A. Boattini, H. Scholl	ADE	2.3 km	MPC · JPL
730152	2011 WB_{41}	—	April 2, 2009	Kitt Peak	Spacewatch	·	1.3 km	MPC · JPL
730153	2011 WQ_{48}	—	September 3, 1999	Siding Spring	R. H. McNaught, K. S. Russell	(69559)	3.7 km	MPC · JPL
730154	2011 WB_{56}	—	May 18, 2010	WISE	WISE	·	2.3 km	MPC · JPL
730155	2011 WD_{62}	—	October 26, 2011	Haleakala	Pan-STARRS 1	·	1.7 km	MPC · JPL
730156	2011 WV_{62}	—	July 21, 2001	Palomar	NEAT	·	820 m	MPC · JPL
730157	2011 WU_{63}	—	October 5, 2005	Catalina	CSS	·	2.6 km	MPC · JPL
730158	2011 WT_{64}	—	April 3, 2009	Cerro Burek	I. de la Cueva	·	2.3 km	MPC · JPL
730159	2011 WB_{65}	—	September 27, 2005	Palomar	NEAT	THB	4.3 km	MPC · JPL
730160	2011 WQ_{67}	—	October 26, 2011	Haleakala	Pan-STARRS 1	·	1.2 km	MPC · JPL
730161	2011 WK_{70}	—	April 20, 2009	Kitt Peak	Spacewatch	·	2.7 km	MPC · JPL
730162	2011 WV_{75}	—	October 24, 2011	Haleakala	Pan-STARRS 1	·	920 m	MPC · JPL
730163	2011 WA_{77}	—	May 24, 2010	WISE	WISE	·	3.1 km	MPC · JPL
730164	2011 WK_{81}	—	May 17, 2009	Sierra Stars	Dillon, W. G.	·	3.6 km	MPC · JPL
730165	2011 WB_{83}	—	October 25, 2011	Haleakala	Pan-STARRS 1	·	1.3 km	MPC · JPL
730166	2011 WE_{84}	—	October 11, 2006	Palomar	NEAT	·	3.5 km	MPC · JPL
730167	2011 WK_{89}	—	June 15, 2010	WISE	WISE	·	3.2 km	MPC · JPL
730168	2011 WE_{92}	—	October 18, 2000	Kitt Peak	Spacewatch	·	3.0 km	MPC · JPL
730169	2011 WS_{93}	—	September 30, 2006	Kitt Peak	Spacewatch	·	1.5 km	MPC · JPL
730170	2011 WZ_{93}	—	February 9, 2008	Mount Lemmon	Mount Lemmon Survey	·	1.4 km	MPC · JPL
730171	2011 WK_{98}	—	November 23, 2011	Mount Lemmon	Mount Lemmon Survey	HOF	2.7 km	MPC · JPL
730172	2011 WP_{100}	—	September 11, 2002	Palomar	NEAT	·	1.6 km	MPC · JPL
730173	2011 WV_{101}	—	August 28, 2006	Kitt Peak	Spacewatch	AEO	940 m	MPC · JPL
730174	2011 WJ_{103}	—	November 3, 2011	Mount Lemmon	Mount Lemmon Survey	EOS	1.4 km	MPC · JPL
730175	2011 WR_{104}	—	September 24, 2011	Mount Lemmon	Mount Lemmon Survey	·	630 m	MPC · JPL
730176	2011 WB_{105}	—	October 26, 2011	Haleakala	Pan-STARRS 1	·	1.2 km	MPC · JPL
730177	2011 WO_{106}	—	May 12, 2010	WISE	WISE	EOS	1.8 km	MPC · JPL
730178	2011 WO_{108}	—	October 26, 2011	Haleakala	Pan-STARRS 1	·	1.5 km	MPC · JPL
730179	2011 WA_{109}	—	September 15, 2007	Mount Lemmon	Mount Lemmon Survey	·	1.9 km	MPC · JPL
730180	2011 WN_{109}	—	November 3, 2011	Kitt Peak	Spacewatch	·	1.5 km	MPC · JPL
730181	2011 WG_{111}	—	May 17, 2010	WISE	WISE	NAE	2.1 km	MPC · JPL
730182	2011 WK_{112}	—	November 28, 2011	Haleakala	Pan-STARRS 1	·	840 m	MPC · JPL
730183	2011 WS_{119}	—	June 9, 2002	Haleakala	NEAT	EUP	5.2 km	MPC · JPL
730184	2011 WH_{121}	—	April 27, 2009	Mount Lemmon	Mount Lemmon Survey	·	2.5 km	MPC · JPL
730185	2011 WU_{124}	—	October 20, 2011	Kitt Peak	Spacewatch	·	1.7 km	MPC · JPL
730186	2011 WB_{126}	—	July 30, 2005	Palomar	NEAT	LIX	3.6 km	MPC · JPL
730187	2011 WW_{126}	—	May 30, 2010	WISE	WISE	EOS	1.7 km	MPC · JPL
730188	2011 WY_{126}	—	February 12, 2004	Kitt Peak	Spacewatch	·	1.6 km	MPC · JPL
730189	2011 WO_{127}	—	November 22, 2006	Kitt Peak	Spacewatch	KOR	1.0 km	MPC · JPL
730190	2011 WT_{130}	—	October 19, 2011	Mount Lemmon	Mount Lemmon Survey	NEM	1.7 km	MPC · JPL
730191	2011 WA_{134}	—	August 26, 1995	La Silla	C.-I. Lagerkvist	·	1.9 km	MPC · JPL
730192	2011 WJ_{134}	—	October 5, 2002	Apache Point	SDSS Collaboration	·	1.8 km	MPC · JPL
730193	2011 WD_{135}	—	January 8, 2007	Mount Lemmon	Mount Lemmon Survey	EMA	3.1 km	MPC · JPL
730194	2011 WY_{136}	—	November 1, 2011	Kitt Peak	Spacewatch	·	1.6 km	MPC · JPL
730195	2011 WB_{139}	—	November 17, 2011	Mount Lemmon	Mount Lemmon Survey	URS	2.7 km	MPC · JPL
730196	2011 WS_{140}	—	May 23, 2010	WISE	WISE	·	3.0 km	MPC · JPL
730197	2011 WO_{146}	—	May 26, 2010	WISE	WISE	VER	2.9 km	MPC · JPL
730198	2011 WR_{148}	—	June 18, 2010	WISE	WISE	·	3.1 km	MPC · JPL
730199	2011 WR_{160}	—	July 5, 2010	WISE	WISE	·	2.8 km	MPC · JPL
730200	2011 WP_{161}	—	May 7, 2010	WISE	WISE	·	2.2 km	MPC · JPL

== 730201–730300 ==
back to top

Designation			Discovery			Properties		Ref
Permanent	Provisional	Named after	Date	Site	Discoverer(s)	Category	Diam.	Ref
730201	2011 WA_{162}	—	May 15, 2010	WISE	WISE	·	2.5 km	MPC · JPL
730202	2011 WM_{162}	—	May 13, 2010	WISE	WISE	·	2.9 km	MPC · JPL
730203	2011 WP_{166}	—	May 28, 2014	Mount Lemmon	Mount Lemmon Survey	·	1.7 km	MPC · JPL
730204	2011 WQ_{166}	—	July 7, 2010	WISE	WISE	·	3.7 km	MPC · JPL
730205	2011 WV_{167}	—	April 5, 2014	Haleakala	Pan-STARRS 1	·	910 m	MPC · JPL
730206	2011 WY_{167}	—	January 14, 2018	Haleakala	Pan-STARRS 1	·	1.8 km	MPC · JPL
730207	2011 WR_{168}	—	May 19, 2010	WISE	WISE	·	1.3 km	MPC · JPL
730208	2011 WU_{171}	—	June 20, 2010	WISE	WISE	LUT	4.7 km	MPC · JPL
730209	2011 WW_{175}	—	November 17, 2011	Kitt Peak	Spacewatch	·	1.7 km	MPC · JPL
730210	2011 WN_{177}	—	November 16, 2011	Mount Lemmon	Mount Lemmon Survey	·	1.3 km	MPC · JPL
730211	2011 WA_{178}	—	November 27, 2011	Mount Lemmon	Mount Lemmon Survey	AGN	900 m	MPC · JPL
730212	2011 WU_{178}	—	November 30, 2011	Kitt Peak	Spacewatch	·	1.6 km	MPC · JPL
730213	2011 WW_{181}	—	April 11, 2005	Mount Lemmon	Mount Lemmon Survey	·	1.6 km	MPC · JPL
730214	2011 WL_{183}	—	November 17, 2011	Kitt Peak	Spacewatch	·	2.6 km	MPC · JPL
730215	2011 XQ_{1}	—	May 1, 2008	Vallemare Borbona	V. S. Casulli	·	3.9 km	MPC · JPL
730216	2011 XG_{2}	—	October 26, 2011	Haleakala	Pan-STARRS 1	·	1.6 km	MPC · JPL
730217	2011 XH_{5}	—	December 1, 2011	Haleakala	Pan-STARRS 1	NEM	1.7 km	MPC · JPL
730218	2011 YJ_{2}	—	January 13, 2010	WISE	WISE	L4	9.1 km	MPC · JPL
730219	2011 YC_{3}	—	December 1, 2006	Mount Lemmon	Mount Lemmon Survey	EOS	2.2 km	MPC · JPL
730220	2011 YO_{3}	—	September 29, 2005	Catalina	CSS	·	3.0 km	MPC · JPL
730221	2011 YO_{4}	—	December 31, 2000	Anderson Mesa	LONEOS	H	630 m	MPC · JPL
730222	2011 YC_{7}	—	October 27, 2005	Palomar	NEAT	·	4.6 km	MPC · JPL
730223	2011 YV_{7}	—	May 4, 2006	Mount Lemmon	Mount Lemmon Survey	L4	10 km	MPC · JPL
730224	2011 YS_{17}	—	October 20, 2003	Kitt Peak	Spacewatch	·	1.2 km	MPC · JPL
730225	2011 YE_{18}	—	May 24, 2010	WISE	WISE	·	2.0 km	MPC · JPL
730226	2011 YC_{24}	—	December 25, 2011	Kitt Peak	Spacewatch	·	1.3 km	MPC · JPL
730227	2011 YF_{34}	—	December 16, 2007	Lulin	LUSS	PHO	2.9 km	MPC · JPL
730228	2011 YY_{36}	—	December 26, 2011	Mount Lemmon	Mount Lemmon Survey	·	1.6 km	MPC · JPL
730229	2011 YR_{38}	—	January 31, 2004	Kitt Peak	Spacewatch	·	1.2 km	MPC · JPL
730230	2011 YZ_{41}	—	December 25, 2011	Mount Lemmon	Mount Lemmon Survey	·	1.6 km	MPC · JPL
730231	2011 YS_{42}	—	January 18, 2010	WISE	WISE	L4	10 km	MPC · JPL
730232	2011 YU_{43}	—	December 27, 2011	Kitt Peak	Spacewatch	·	510 m	MPC · JPL
730233	2011 YD_{47}	—	December 4, 1999	Kitt Peak	Spacewatch	L4	9.9 km	MPC · JPL
730234	2011 YA_{48}	—	October 25, 2011	Haleakala	Pan-STARRS 1	·	1.7 km	MPC · JPL
730235	2011 YJ_{49}	—	January 25, 2007	Kitt Peak	Spacewatch	EOS	1.7 km	MPC · JPL
730236	2011 YG_{50}	—	July 26, 2010	WISE	WISE	·	2.9 km	MPC · JPL
730237	2011 YN_{50}	—	December 27, 2011	Kitt Peak	Spacewatch	NEM	1.5 km	MPC · JPL
730238	2011 YY_{51}	—	July 23, 2010	WISE	WISE	·	3.9 km	MPC · JPL
730239	2011 YE_{54}	—	November 19, 2007	Mount Lemmon	Mount Lemmon Survey	·	2.9 km	MPC · JPL
730240	2011 YZ_{57}	—	December 29, 2011	Kitt Peak	Spacewatch	·	3.9 km	MPC · JPL
730241	2011 YU_{61}	—	February 22, 2007	Kitt Peak	Spacewatch	·	2.9 km	MPC · JPL
730242	2011 YU_{64}	—	April 1, 2008	Mount Lemmon	Mount Lemmon Survey	·	3.6 km	MPC · JPL
730243	2011 YV_{71}	—	February 3, 2010	WISE	WISE	L4	10 km	MPC · JPL
730244	2011 YY_{71}	—	November 21, 2001	Socorro	LINEAR	·	2.8 km	MPC · JPL
730245	2011 YX_{72}	—	June 16, 2010	WISE	WISE	·	2.7 km	MPC · JPL
730246	2011 YA_{73}	—	December 30, 2011	Kitt Peak	Spacewatch	EUN	1.3 km	MPC · JPL
730247	2011 YP_{77}	—	January 21, 2012	Catalina	CSS	·	1.6 km	MPC · JPL
730248	2011 YU_{81}	—	July 16, 2010	WISE	WISE	·	3.6 km	MPC · JPL
730249	2011 YG_{84}	—	January 13, 2002	Palomar	NEAT	·	1.9 km	MPC · JPL
730250	2011 YB_{87}	—	December 28, 2011	Mount Lemmon	Mount Lemmon Survey	L4	9.8 km	MPC · JPL
730251	2011 YH_{87}	—	October 27, 2011	Mount Lemmon	Mount Lemmon Survey	·	1.9 km	MPC · JPL
730252	2011 YS_{90}	—	December 27, 2011	Kitt Peak	Spacewatch	NYS	800 m	MPC · JPL
730253	2011 YD_{97}	—	December 29, 2011	Mount Lemmon	Mount Lemmon Survey	L4	6.3 km	MPC · JPL
730254	2012 AH_{3}	—	February 13, 2010	WISE	WISE	·	4.5 km	MPC · JPL
730255	2012 AV_{4}	—	February 20, 2009	Kitt Peak	Spacewatch	·	560 m	MPC · JPL
730256	2012 AT_{14}	—	December 27, 2011	Catalina	CSS	·	1.5 km	MPC · JPL
730257	2012 AY_{15}	—	January 14, 2012	Mount Lemmon	Mount Lemmon Survey	·	1.5 km	MPC · JPL
730258	2012 AA_{16}	—	January 12, 2010	WISE	WISE	L4	9.2 km	MPC · JPL
730259	2012 AB_{18}	—	September 19, 1998	Apache Point	SDSS Collaboration	·	1.0 km	MPC · JPL
730260	2012 AR_{19}	—	February 1, 2010	WISE	WISE	L4	10 km	MPC · JPL
730261	2012 AP_{20}	—	December 5, 1999	Kitt Peak	Spacewatch	L4	8.1 km	MPC · JPL
730262	2012 AY_{22}	—	January 1, 2012	Mount Lemmon	Mount Lemmon Survey	·	1.4 km	MPC · JPL
730263	2012 AF_{25}	—	July 6, 2010	WISE	WISE	EOS	1.8 km	MPC · JPL
730264	2012 AB_{26}	—	February 3, 2010	WISE	WISE	L4	10 km	MPC · JPL
730265	2012 AF_{26}	—	July 19, 2010	WISE	WISE	·	1.3 km	MPC · JPL
730266	2012 AN_{26}	—	April 14, 2004	Palomar	NEAT	·	1.4 km	MPC · JPL
730267	2012 AV_{26}	—	January 27, 2007	Mount Lemmon	Mount Lemmon Survey	·	2.1 km	MPC · JPL
730268	2012 AY_{28}	—	July 14, 2010	WISE	WISE	·	3.6 km	MPC · JPL
730269	2012 AM_{29}	—	July 21, 2010	WISE	WISE	PHO	900 m	MPC · JPL
730270	2012 BC_{4}	—	June 19, 2010	WISE	WISE	HOF	2.3 km	MPC · JPL
730271	2012 BJ_{7}	—	January 18, 2012	Mount Lemmon	Mount Lemmon Survey	·	1.3 km	MPC · JPL
730272	2012 BN_{8}	—	January 3, 2012	Kitt Peak	Spacewatch	·	1.6 km	MPC · JPL
730273	2012 BP_{9}	—	July 16, 2010	WISE	WISE	·	880 m	MPC · JPL
730274	2012 BB_{21}	—	January 19, 2012	Haleakala	Pan-STARRS 1	·	1.4 km	MPC · JPL
730275	2012 BN_{21}	—	November 6, 2002	Palomar	NEAT	·	1.9 km	MPC · JPL
730276	2012 BS_{27}	—	May 29, 2010	WISE	WISE	·	3.2 km	MPC · JPL
730277	2012 BA_{32}	—	February 9, 2002	Kitt Peak	Spacewatch	·	1.7 km	MPC · JPL
730278	2012 BW_{37}	—	February 9, 2010	WISE	WISE	L4	9.6 km	MPC · JPL
730279	2012 BR_{45}	—	January 19, 2012	Mount Lemmon	Mount Lemmon Survey	·	580 m	MPC · JPL
730280	2012 BY_{47}	—	December 24, 2011	Mount Lemmon	Mount Lemmon Survey	·	640 m	MPC · JPL
730281	2012 BS_{48}	—	February 12, 2008	Mount Lemmon	Mount Lemmon Survey	·	1.1 km	MPC · JPL
730282	2012 BS_{50}	—	July 25, 2010	WISE	WISE	·	3.3 km	MPC · JPL
730283	2012 BV_{50}	—	January 4, 2012	Mount Lemmon	Mount Lemmon Survey	·	1.5 km	MPC · JPL
730284	2012 BJ_{51}	—	January 13, 1996	Kitt Peak	Spacewatch	·	2.7 km	MPC · JPL
730285	2012 BO_{51}	—	January 3, 2012	Kitt Peak	Spacewatch	·	900 m	MPC · JPL
730286	2012 BY_{54}	—	August 11, 2001	Haleakala	NEAT	·	3.3 km	MPC · JPL
730287	2012 BT_{58}	—	January 18, 2012	Mount Lemmon	Mount Lemmon Survey	·	1.9 km	MPC · JPL
730288	2012 BB_{64}	—	January 20, 2012	Mount Lemmon	Mount Lemmon Survey	HOF	2.0 km	MPC · JPL
730289	2012 BM_{64}	—	July 22, 2010	WISE	WISE	·	2.3 km	MPC · JPL
730290	2012 BT_{69}	—	February 1, 2005	Kitt Peak	Spacewatch	·	810 m	MPC · JPL
730291	2012 BK_{76}	—	September 27, 2003	Apache Point	SDSS Collaboration	(895)	3.8 km	MPC · JPL
730292	2012 BS_{80}	—	January 27, 2012	Mount Lemmon	Mount Lemmon Survey	·	1.3 km	MPC · JPL
730293	2012 BO_{83}	—	December 31, 2011	Kitt Peak	Spacewatch	·	3.0 km	MPC · JPL
730294	2012 BY_{84}	—	September 18, 2003	Kitt Peak	Spacewatch	·	3.5 km	MPC · JPL
730295	2012 BL_{90}	—	April 17, 2001	Saint-Véran	St. Veran	·	1.3 km	MPC · JPL
730296	2012 BK_{100}	—	October 1, 2010	Kitt Peak	Spacewatch	THM	1.8 km	MPC · JPL
730297	2012 BY_{100}	—	January 27, 2012	Kitt Peak	Spacewatch	·	880 m	MPC · JPL
730298	2012 BK_{101}	—	March 23, 2003	Apache Point	SDSS Collaboration	HOF	2.2 km	MPC · JPL
730299	2012 BL_{101}	—	January 27, 2012	Mount Lemmon	Mount Lemmon Survey	TIN	1.1 km	MPC · JPL
730300	2012 BE_{112}	—	January 19, 2012	Haleakala	Pan-STARRS 1	MAS	590 m	MPC · JPL

== 730301–730400 ==
back to top

Designation			Discovery			Properties		Ref
Permanent	Provisional	Named after	Date	Site	Discoverer(s)	Category	Diam.	Ref
730301	2012 BR_{113}	—	January 27, 2012	Mount Lemmon	Mount Lemmon Survey	·	2.7 km	MPC · JPL
730302	2012 BL_{125}	—	February 18, 2001	Haleakala	NEAT	·	2.8 km	MPC · JPL
730303	2012 BU_{129}	—	July 29, 2005	Palomar	NEAT	·	2.2 km	MPC · JPL
730304	2012 BH_{130}	—	March 13, 2002	Palomar	NEAT	EOS	2.1 km	MPC · JPL
730305	2012 BK_{131}	—	December 1, 2005	Catalina	CSS	THB	2.9 km	MPC · JPL
730306	2012 BN_{131}	—	June 26, 2010	WISE	WISE	·	2.3 km	MPC · JPL
730307	2012 BQ_{142}	—	January 9, 2000	Kitt Peak	Spacewatch	L4	10 km	MPC · JPL
730308	2012 BF_{143}	—	October 3, 2006	Mount Lemmon	Mount Lemmon Survey	·	1.8 km	MPC · JPL
730309	2012 BS_{147}	—	July 12, 2010	WISE	WISE	·	1.5 km	MPC · JPL
730310	2012 BG_{148}	—	January 27, 2012	Mount Lemmon	Mount Lemmon Survey	·	1.8 km	MPC · JPL
730311	2012 BG_{150}	—	October 18, 2007	Kitt Peak	Spacewatch	·	570 m	MPC · JPL
730312	2012 BO_{156}	—	October 11, 2010	Mount Lemmon	Mount Lemmon Survey	·	1.6 km	MPC · JPL
730313	2012 BG_{159}	—	January 29, 2012	Kitt Peak	Spacewatch	EOS	2.8 km	MPC · JPL
730314	2012 BM_{160}	—	August 1, 2010	WISE	WISE	·	2.8 km	MPC · JPL
730315	2012 BQ_{160}	—	July 5, 2010	WISE	WISE	·	3.7 km	MPC · JPL
730316	2012 BS_{162}	—	August 5, 2010	WISE	WISE	·	2.6 km	MPC · JPL
730317	2012 BV_{162}	—	November 6, 2015	Mount Lemmon	Mount Lemmon Survey	DOR	2.4 km	MPC · JPL
730318	2012 BE_{164}	—	June 5, 2010	WISE	WISE	·	1.9 km	MPC · JPL
730319	2012 BH_{171}	—	January 26, 2012	Haleakala	Pan-STARRS 1	·	510 m	MPC · JPL
730320	2012 BP_{171}	—	July 21, 2010	WISE	WISE	·	2.9 km	MPC · JPL
730321	2012 BX_{174}	—	January 27, 2012	Mount Lemmon	Mount Lemmon Survey	·	1.3 km	MPC · JPL
730322	2012 CW	—	November 10, 2010	Mount Lemmon	Mount Lemmon Survey	·	1.4 km	MPC · JPL
730323	2012 CA_{1}	—	October 21, 2003	Palomar	NEAT	MAS	650 m	MPC · JPL
730324	2012 CF_{11}	—	February 1, 2012	Kitt Peak	Spacewatch	·	2.4 km	MPC · JPL
730325	2012 CB_{13}	—	December 30, 2000	Anderson Mesa	LONEOS	·	1.3 km	MPC · JPL
730326	2012 CG_{13}	—	January 25, 2012	Kitt Peak	Spacewatch	·	2.4 km	MPC · JPL
730327	2012 CQ_{17}	—	February 3, 2012	Haleakala	Pan-STARRS 1	H	420 m	MPC · JPL
730328	2012 CO_{20}	—	March 27, 2009	Catalina	CSS	·	630 m	MPC · JPL
730329	2012 CP_{21}	—	March 12, 2002	Apache Point	SDSS	·	2.0 km	MPC · JPL
730330	2012 CT_{21}	—	August 8, 2010	WISE	WISE	·	3.6 km	MPC · JPL
730331	2012 CH_{32}	—	December 27, 2011	Mount Lemmon	Mount Lemmon Survey	·	2.0 km	MPC · JPL
730332	2012 CK_{35}	—	November 12, 2001	Apache Point	SDSS Collaboration	·	1.6 km	MPC · JPL
730333	2012 CB_{36}	—	January 19, 2012	Haleakala	Pan-STARRS 1	·	1.4 km	MPC · JPL
730334	2012 CV_{36}	—	February 1, 2012	Kitt Peak	Spacewatch	EOS	1.4 km	MPC · JPL
730335	2012 CT_{38}	—	November 13, 2010	Mount Lemmon	Mount Lemmon Survey	·	3.8 km	MPC · JPL
730336	2012 CV_{39}	—	February 3, 2012	Haleakala	Pan-STARRS 1	·	2.0 km	MPC · JPL
730337	2012 CP_{40}	—	February 3, 2012	Haleakala	Pan-STARRS 1	·	1.4 km	MPC · JPL
730338	2012 CK_{41}	—	November 12, 2001	Apache Point	SDSS Collaboration	·	1.9 km	MPC · JPL
730339	2012 CK_{44}	—	February 13, 2012	Kitt Peak	Spacewatch	·	550 m	MPC · JPL
730340	2012 CQ_{45}	—	March 20, 2007	Lulin	LUSS	·	3.9 km	MPC · JPL
730341	2012 CK_{56}	—	January 31, 2012	Catalina	CSS	·	2.3 km	MPC · JPL
730342	2012 CZ_{56}	—	September 16, 2009	Mount Lemmon	Mount Lemmon Survey	·	1.8 km	MPC · JPL
730343	2012 CP_{57}	—	July 26, 2010	WISE	WISE	AST	1.3 km	MPC · JPL
730344	2012 CP_{59}	—	April 21, 2009	Mount Lemmon	Mount Lemmon Survey	·	870 m	MPC · JPL
730345	2012 CA_{60}	—	December 13, 2014	Haleakala	Pan-STARRS 1	·	720 m	MPC · JPL
730346	2012 CS_{60}	—	July 20, 2010	WISE	WISE	·	2.4 km	MPC · JPL
730347	2012 CS_{64}	—	July 29, 2010	WISE	WISE	·	3.1 km	MPC · JPL
730348	2012 CV_{66}	—	February 13, 2012	Haleakala	Pan-STARRS 1	·	480 m	MPC · JPL
730349	2012 CC_{70}	—	February 1, 2012	Kitt Peak	Spacewatch	·	1.4 km	MPC · JPL
730350	2012 DL	—	January 21, 2012	Haleakala	Pan-STARRS 1	·	2.2 km	MPC · JPL
730351	2012 DL_{1}	—	February 16, 2012	Haleakala	Pan-STARRS 1	EOS	1.5 km	MPC · JPL
730352	2012 DL_{2}	—	February 16, 2012	Haleakala	Pan-STARRS 1	·	830 m	MPC · JPL
730353	2012 DT_{6}	—	October 1, 2009	Mount Lemmon	Mount Lemmon Survey	L4	10 km	MPC · JPL
730354	2012 DT_{9}	—	April 5, 2005	Mount Lemmon	Mount Lemmon Survey	MAS	570 m	MPC · JPL
730355	2012 DX_{11}	—	February 19, 2012	Kitt Peak	Spacewatch	·	650 m	MPC · JPL
730356	2012 DQ_{35}	—	May 4, 2000	Apache Point	SDSS Collaboration	MAR	1.1 km	MPC · JPL
730357	2012 DN_{36}	—	August 30, 2000	Kitt Peak	Spacewatch	·	1.4 km	MPC · JPL
730358	2012 DE_{40}	—	October 22, 2003	Apache Point	SDSS Collaboration	·	2.9 km	MPC · JPL
730359	2012 DP_{42}	—	February 23, 2012	Mount Lemmon	Mount Lemmon Survey	·	580 m	MPC · JPL
730360	2012 DF_{43}	—	August 31, 2000	Kitt Peak	Spacewatch	·	1.5 km	MPC · JPL
730361	2012 DP_{49}	—	February 23, 2012	Mount Lemmon	Mount Lemmon Survey	·	640 m	MPC · JPL
730362	2012 DY_{59}	—	February 4, 2012	Haleakala	Pan-STARRS 1	EUN	1 km	MPC · JPL
730363	2012 DC_{62}	—	February 2, 2012	Catalina	CSS	·	480 m	MPC · JPL
730364	2012 DQ_{65}	—	January 19, 2012	Haleakala	Pan-STARRS 1	V	420 m	MPC · JPL
730365	2012 DX_{67}	—	February 3, 2012	Haleakala	Pan-STARRS 1	·	750 m	MPC · JPL
730366	2012 DA_{76}	—	December 1, 2006	Mount Lemmon	Mount Lemmon Survey	·	2.0 km	MPC · JPL
730367	2012 DW_{79}	—	April 17, 2001	Anderson Mesa	LONEOS	·	1.5 km	MPC · JPL
730368	2012 DF_{87}	—	April 13, 2001	Kitt Peak	Spacewatch	·	3.3 km	MPC · JPL
730369	2012 DU_{87}	—	September 27, 2003	Socorro	LINEAR	VER	3.1 km	MPC · JPL
730370	2012 DK_{88}	—	October 8, 1999	Kitt Peak	Spacewatch	V	730 m	MPC · JPL
730371	2012 DD_{93}	—	February 16, 2012	Haleakala	Pan-STARRS 1	·	1.7 km	MPC · JPL
730372	2012 DA_{94}	—	February 3, 2012	Haleakala	Pan-STARRS 1	·	1.0 km	MPC · JPL
730373	2012 DB_{94}	—	February 26, 2007	Mount Lemmon	Mount Lemmon Survey	·	1.7 km	MPC · JPL
730374	2012 DA_{98}	—	February 18, 2012	Palomar	Palomar Transient Factory	·	2.6 km	MPC · JPL
730375	2012 DB_{98}	—	February 24, 2012	Catalina	CSS	BRA	1.2 km	MPC · JPL
730376	2012 DB_{100}	—	October 1, 2005	Mount Lemmon	Mount Lemmon Survey	·	1.5 km	MPC · JPL
730377	2012 DN_{100}	—	April 14, 2007	Mount Lemmon	Mount Lemmon Survey	·	1.7 km	MPC · JPL
730378	2012 DY_{100}	—	February 26, 2012	Haleakala	Pan-STARRS 1	·	1.0 km	MPC · JPL
730379	2012 DA_{101}	—	February 28, 2012	Haleakala	Pan-STARRS 1	·	1.9 km	MPC · JPL
730380	2012 DH_{103}	—	March 24, 2001	Kitt Peak	Spacewatch	·	2.5 km	MPC · JPL
730381	2012 DZ_{103}	—	February 27, 2012	Haleakala	Pan-STARRS 1	·	1.1 km	MPC · JPL
730382	2012 DK_{115}	—	January 29, 2010	WISE	WISE	·	2.3 km	MPC · JPL
730383	2012 DH_{117}	—	February 24, 2012	Mount Lemmon	Mount Lemmon Survey	H	460 m	MPC · JPL
730384	2012 DA_{118}	—	February 23, 2012	Mount Lemmon	Mount Lemmon Survey	·	1.1 km	MPC · JPL
730385	2012 DS_{120}	—	February 21, 2012	Kitt Peak	Spacewatch	·	790 m	MPC · JPL
730386	2012 DP_{122}	—	February 27, 2012	Haleakala	Pan-STARRS 1	·	2.0 km	MPC · JPL
730387	2012 DZ_{122}	—	February 16, 2012	Haleakala	Pan-STARRS 1	·	2.4 km	MPC · JPL
730388	2012 EA_{7}	—	February 22, 2012	Siding Spring	SSS	·	2.9 km	MPC · JPL
730389	2012 EG_{7}	—	May 18, 2001	Anderson Mesa	LONEOS	·	5.9 km	MPC · JPL
730390	2012 EG_{12}	—	February 21, 2012	Kitt Peak	Spacewatch	EOS	1.4 km	MPC · JPL
730391	2012 EP_{12}	—	December 6, 2005	Kitt Peak	Spacewatch	·	1.9 km	MPC · JPL
730392	2012 EC_{14}	—	October 26, 2009	Kitt Peak	Spacewatch	3:2	4.8 km	MPC · JPL
730393	2012 EN_{17}	—	March 16, 2012	Haleakala	Pan-STARRS 1	·	1.8 km	MPC · JPL
730394	2012 ET_{17}	—	February 25, 2012	Mount Lemmon	Mount Lemmon Survey	EOS	1.4 km	MPC · JPL
730395	2012 EU_{20}	—	March 14, 2012	Kitt Peak	Spacewatch	·	1.5 km	MPC · JPL
730396	2012 ET_{25}	—	March 13, 2012	Kitt Peak	Spacewatch	NYS	1.0 km	MPC · JPL
730397	2012 EM_{26}	—	March 14, 2012	Kitt Peak	Spacewatch	·	760 m	MPC · JPL
730398	2012 EH_{27}	—	March 15, 2012	Mount Lemmon	Mount Lemmon Survey	EOS	1.4 km	MPC · JPL
730399	2012 EE_{29}	—	March 15, 2012	Mount Lemmon	Mount Lemmon Survey	·	1.2 km	MPC · JPL
730400	2012 EK_{30}	—	March 13, 2012	Haleakala	Pan-STARRS 1	·	830 m	MPC · JPL

== 730401–730500 ==
back to top

Designation			Discovery			Properties		Ref
Permanent	Provisional	Named after	Date	Site	Discoverer(s)	Category	Diam.	Ref
730401	2012 FW_{3}	—	March 15, 2012	Mount Lemmon	Mount Lemmon Survey	·	560 m	MPC · JPL
730402	2012 FD_{4}	—	October 9, 2010	Mount Lemmon	Mount Lemmon Survey	V	500 m	MPC · JPL
730403	2012 FQ_{5}	—	July 21, 2010	WISE	WISE	T_{j} (2.99) · EUP	2.6 km	MPC · JPL
730404	2012 FL_{7}	—	November 5, 2005	Kitt Peak	Spacewatch	KOR	1.0 km	MPC · JPL
730405	2012 FM_{8}	—	March 12, 2007	Kitt Peak	Spacewatch	·	1.6 km	MPC · JPL
730406	2012 FO_{8}	—	March 13, 2012	Mount Lemmon	Mount Lemmon Survey	EOS	1.5 km	MPC · JPL
730407	2012 FT_{8}	—	March 1, 2012	Mount Lemmon	Mount Lemmon Survey	·	530 m	MPC · JPL
730408	2012 FZ_{12}	—	March 21, 2012	Catalina	CSS	·	2.1 km	MPC · JPL
730409	2012 FV_{15}	—	March 17, 2012	Mount Lemmon	Mount Lemmon Survey	·	1.2 km	MPC · JPL
730410	2012 FD_{16}	—	March 17, 2012	Mount Lemmon	Mount Lemmon Survey	·	460 m	MPC · JPL
730411	2012 FH_{24}	—	February 1, 2005	Kitt Peak	Spacewatch	·	540 m	MPC · JPL
730412	2012 FM_{26}	—	February 26, 2012	Kitt Peak	Spacewatch	·	730 m	MPC · JPL
730413	2012 FD_{36}	—	August 14, 2002	Palomar	NEAT	H	470 m	MPC · JPL
730414	2012 FA_{40}	—	February 27, 2012	Haleakala	Pan-STARRS 1	·	600 m	MPC · JPL
730415	2012 FQ_{45}	—	April 11, 2005	Mount Lemmon	Mount Lemmon Survey	·	730 m	MPC · JPL
730416	2012 FJ_{46}	—	March 16, 2012	Kitt Peak	Spacewatch	·	530 m	MPC · JPL
730417	2012 FG_{48}	—	March 20, 2001	Kitt Peak	Spacewatch	·	2.2 km	MPC · JPL
730418	2012 FF_{50}	—	February 28, 2012	Haleakala	Pan-STARRS 1	V	520 m	MPC · JPL
730419	2012 FW_{51}	—	March 3, 2005	Catalina	CSS	·	710 m	MPC · JPL
730420	2012 FE_{54}	—	February 27, 2012	Haleakala	Pan-STARRS 1	·	510 m	MPC · JPL
730421	2012 FJ_{55}	—	August 20, 2003	Palomar	NEAT	·	5.1 km	MPC · JPL
730422	2012 FJ_{57}	—	November 24, 2003	Palomar	NEAT	·	4.5 km	MPC · JPL
730423	2012 FP_{57}	—	July 6, 2003	Kitt Peak	Spacewatch	·	2.4 km	MPC · JPL
730424	2012 FZ_{58}	—	January 11, 2008	Kitt Peak	Spacewatch	·	870 m	MPC · JPL
730425	2012 FC_{59}	—	March 27, 2012	Bergisch Gladbach	W. Bickel	BAR	1.0 km	MPC · JPL
730426	2012 FT_{59}	—	February 22, 2012	Kitt Peak	Spacewatch	·	690 m	MPC · JPL
730427	2012 FV_{64}	—	March 21, 2012	Mount Lemmon	Mount Lemmon Survey	·	1.5 km	MPC · JPL
730428	2012 FR_{67}	—	November 19, 2009	Bergisch Gladbach	W. Bickel	·	6.0 km	MPC · JPL
730429	2012 FY_{69}	—	October 6, 2008	Mount Lemmon	Mount Lemmon Survey	·	2.4 km	MPC · JPL
730430	2012 FF_{76}	—	March 18, 2012	Zelenchukskaya	T. V. Krjačko	EUP	2.9 km	MPC · JPL
730431	2012 FQ_{79}	—	March 16, 2012	Kitt Peak	Spacewatch	·	980 m	MPC · JPL
730432	2012 FB_{80}	—	March 16, 2012	Kitt Peak	Spacewatch	·	580 m	MPC · JPL
730433	2012 FZ_{80}	—	July 6, 2007	Reedy Creek	J. Broughton	T_{j} (2.97)	5.1 km	MPC · JPL
730434	2012 FR_{83}	—	September 19, 2014	Haleakala	Pan-STARRS 1	·	1.4 km	MPC · JPL
730435	2012 FQ_{84}	—	March 16, 2012	Kitt Peak	Spacewatch	H	460 m	MPC · JPL
730436	2012 FQ_{86}	—	March 17, 2012	Kitt Peak	Spacewatch	·	2.4 km	MPC · JPL
730437	2012 FV_{86}	—	March 16, 2012	Haleakala	Pan-STARRS 1	·	2.6 km	MPC · JPL
730438	2012 FZ_{87}	—	April 29, 2008	Mount Lemmon	Mount Lemmon Survey	·	1.1 km	MPC · JPL
730439	2012 FF_{93}	—	July 7, 2016	Haleakala	Pan-STARRS 1	·	610 m	MPC · JPL
730440	2012 FM_{93}	—	March 16, 2012	Mount Lemmon	Mount Lemmon Survey	·	1.7 km	MPC · JPL
730441	2012 FK_{96}	—	August 27, 2014	Haleakala	Pan-STARRS 1	·	2.0 km	MPC · JPL
730442	2012 FG_{98}	—	March 29, 2012	Mount Lemmon	Mount Lemmon Survey	·	770 m	MPC · JPL
730443	2012 FN_{99}	—	March 29, 2012	Haleakala	Pan-STARRS 1	·	1.9 km	MPC · JPL
730444	2012 FX_{100}	—	March 23, 2012	Mount Lemmon	Mount Lemmon Survey	NYS	1.0 km	MPC · JPL
730445	2012 FZ_{100}	—	March 27, 2012	Mount Lemmon	Mount Lemmon Survey	·	1.1 km	MPC · JPL
730446	2012 FQ_{101}	—	March 28, 2012	Mount Lemmon	Mount Lemmon Survey	NYS	920 m	MPC · JPL
730447	2012 FA_{104}	—	March 29, 2012	Haleakala	Pan-STARRS 1	EOS	1.6 km	MPC · JPL
730448	2012 FZ_{104}	—	March 31, 2012	Mount Lemmon	Mount Lemmon Survey	·	1.7 km	MPC · JPL
730449	2012 GK_{6}	—	February 26, 2012	Kitt Peak	Spacewatch	·	860 m	MPC · JPL
730450	2012 GE_{9}	—	March 14, 2012	Kitt Peak	Spacewatch	·	760 m	MPC · JPL
730451	2012 GE_{10}	—	January 14, 2011	Mount Lemmon	Mount Lemmon Survey	·	2.1 km	MPC · JPL
730452	2012 GJ_{12}	—	September 21, 2003	Palomar	NEAT	PHO	2.8 km	MPC · JPL
730453	2012 GE_{13}	—	February 28, 2003	Kleť	Kleť	·	1.8 km	MPC · JPL
730454	2012 GH_{15}	—	April 13, 2012	Haleakala	Pan-STARRS 1	·	2.0 km	MPC · JPL
730455	2012 GM_{15}	—	October 17, 2003	Kitt Peak	Spacewatch	URS	3.6 km	MPC · JPL
730456	2012 GT_{15}	—	April 13, 2012	Haleakala	Pan-STARRS 1	EOS	1.3 km	MPC · JPL
730457	2012 GH_{16}	—	May 25, 2001	Palomar	NEAT	·	3.9 km	MPC · JPL
730458	2012 GA_{19}	—	March 28, 2012	Kitt Peak	Spacewatch	·	1.3 km	MPC · JPL
730459	2012 GD_{20}	—	March 29, 2012	Kitt Peak	Spacewatch	EOS	1.5 km	MPC · JPL
730460	2012 GP_{20}	—	March 26, 2003	Palomar	NEAT	·	2.2 km	MPC · JPL
730461	2012 GE_{23}	—	March 29, 2001	Haleakala	NEAT	·	4.0 km	MPC · JPL
730462	2012 GH_{27}	—	May 4, 2001	Palomar	NEAT	EUP	6.0 km	MPC · JPL
730463	2012 GB_{29}	—	August 5, 2000	Haleakala	NEAT	EUN	1.5 km	MPC · JPL
730464	2012 GF_{31}	—	April 1, 2012	Mount Lemmon	Mount Lemmon Survey	TIR	2.7 km	MPC · JPL
730465	2012 GL_{31}	—	August 28, 2003	Palomar	NEAT	·	5.0 km	MPC · JPL
730466	2012 GB_{33}	—	April 13, 2012	Haleakala	Pan-STARRS 1	THM	1.8 km	MPC · JPL
730467	2012 GL_{33}	—	July 11, 2005	Kitt Peak	Spacewatch	MAS	610 m	MPC · JPL
730468	2012 GK_{39}	—	May 4, 2005	Palomar	NEAT	·	810 m	MPC · JPL
730469	2012 GJ_{40}	—	March 31, 2012	Mount Lemmon	Mount Lemmon Survey	·	3.6 km	MPC · JPL
730470	2012 GF_{41}	—	April 13, 2012	Haleakala	Pan-STARRS 1	·	1.8 km	MPC · JPL
730471	2012 GG_{42}	—	November 15, 1995	Kitt Peak	Spacewatch	·	1.8 km	MPC · JPL
730472	2012 GT_{47}	—	June 18, 2013	Haleakala	Pan-STARRS 1	·	1.7 km	MPC · JPL
730473	2012 GT_{48}	—	April 13, 2012	Haleakala	Pan-STARRS 1	·	1.3 km	MPC · JPL
730474	2012 GH_{49}	—	April 15, 2012	Haleakala	Pan-STARRS 1	HOF	1.9 km	MPC · JPL
730475	2012 GN_{50}	—	April 15, 2012	Haleakala	Pan-STARRS 1	EOS	1.3 km	MPC · JPL
730476	2012 GM_{54}	—	November 1, 2010	Mount Lemmon	Mount Lemmon Survey	V	450 m	MPC · JPL
730477	2012 HW_{4}	—	November 11, 2009	Mount Lemmon	Mount Lemmon Survey	·	2.9 km	MPC · JPL
730478	2012 HC_{6}	—	December 26, 2011	Mount Lemmon	Mount Lemmon Survey	JUN	1.2 km	MPC · JPL
730479	2012 HZ_{7}	—	February 2, 2006	Kitt Peak	Spacewatch	·	2.6 km	MPC · JPL
730480	2012 HG_{10}	—	March 6, 2003	Apache Point	SDSS Collaboration	·	4.5 km	MPC · JPL
730481	2012 HQ_{12}	—	November 22, 2009	Mount Lemmon	Mount Lemmon Survey	·	2.3 km	MPC · JPL
730482	2012 HJ_{13}	—	April 21, 2012	Haleakala	Pan-STARRS 1	·	2.3 km	MPC · JPL
730483	2012 HK_{22}	—	February 7, 2003	Kitt Peak	Spacewatch	·	1.8 km	MPC · JPL
730484	2012 HR_{25}	—	November 18, 2006	Mount Lemmon	Mount Lemmon Survey	·	1.2 km	MPC · JPL
730485	2012 HQ_{29}	—	April 27, 2012	Haleakala	Pan-STARRS 1	EOS	1.6 km	MPC · JPL
730486	2012 HB_{30}	—	August 28, 2009	Kitt Peak	Spacewatch	·	940 m	MPC · JPL
730487	2012 HX_{32}	—	April 1, 2012	Kitt Peak	Spacewatch	H	400 m	MPC · JPL
730488	2012 HU_{33}	—	April 25, 2001	Haleakala	NEAT	·	2.6 km	MPC · JPL
730489	2012 HO_{35}	—	October 11, 2009	Mount Lemmon	Mount Lemmon Survey	·	1.3 km	MPC · JPL
730490	2012 HF_{36}	—	April 27, 2012	Haleakala	Pan-STARRS 1	·	1.6 km	MPC · JPL
730491	2012 HB_{38}	—	April 28, 2012	Mount Lemmon	Mount Lemmon Survey	·	1.8 km	MPC · JPL
730492	2012 HV_{41}	—	January 16, 2005	Kitt Peak	Spacewatch	·	600 m	MPC · JPL
730493	2012 HN_{50}	—	September 18, 2003	Palomar	NEAT	(21885)	4.5 km	MPC · JPL
730494	2012 HS_{55}	—	April 16, 2012	Haleakala	Pan-STARRS 1	·	2.3 km	MPC · JPL
730495 Costafrancini	2012 HH_{58}	Costafrancini	April 18, 2012	Mount Graham	K. Černis, R. P. Boyle	·	2.1 km	MPC · JPL
730496	2012 HR_{60}	—	April 19, 2012	Mount Lemmon	Mount Lemmon Survey	·	910 m	MPC · JPL
730497	2012 HK_{63}	—	February 16, 2004	Kitt Peak	Spacewatch	·	1.5 km	MPC · JPL
730498	2012 HX_{66}	—	March 26, 2003	Kitt Peak	Spacewatch	·	3.3 km	MPC · JPL
730499	2012 HT_{70}	—	April 23, 2012	Kitt Peak	Spacewatch	V	580 m	MPC · JPL
730500	2012 HM_{76}	—	August 28, 2005	Kitt Peak	Spacewatch	NYS	900 m	MPC · JPL

== 730501–730600 ==
back to top

Designation			Discovery			Properties		Ref
Permanent	Provisional	Named after	Date	Site	Discoverer(s)	Category	Diam.	Ref
730501	2012 HU_{76}	—	November 11, 2009	Kitt Peak	Spacewatch	·	2.8 km	MPC · JPL
730502	2012 HH_{77}	—	February 27, 2006	Kitt Peak	Spacewatch	·	2.4 km	MPC · JPL
730503	2012 HV_{82}	—	November 27, 2003	Goodricke-Pigott	R. A. Tucker	·	6.4 km	MPC · JPL
730504	2012 HM_{87}	—	April 27, 2012	Haleakala	Pan-STARRS 1	·	630 m	MPC · JPL
730505	2012 HN_{87}	—	April 27, 2012	Haleakala	Pan-STARRS 1	·	1.9 km	MPC · JPL
730506	2012 HR_{89}	—	October 8, 2015	Haleakala	Pan-STARRS 1	TIR	2.3 km	MPC · JPL
730507	2012 HY_{89}	—	October 3, 2014	Mount Lemmon	Mount Lemmon Survey	NAE	2.1 km	MPC · JPL
730508	2012 HA_{90}	—	June 7, 2013	Mount Lemmon	Mount Lemmon Survey	·	1.6 km	MPC · JPL
730509	2012 HH_{91}	—	July 16, 2013	Haleakala	Pan-STARRS 1	·	2.0 km	MPC · JPL
730510	2012 HZ_{93}	—	December 26, 2014	Haleakala	Pan-STARRS 1	·	940 m	MPC · JPL
730511	2012 HS_{98}	—	April 19, 2012	Mount Lemmon	Mount Lemmon Survey	·	1.6 km	MPC · JPL
730512	2012 HZ_{98}	—	April 27, 2012	Haleakala	Pan-STARRS 1	·	1.6 km	MPC · JPL
730513	2012 HB_{100}	—	April 18, 2012	Mount Lemmon	Mount Lemmon Survey	MAS	660 m	MPC · JPL
730514	2012 HC_{101}	—	April 30, 2012	Kitt Peak	Spacewatch	·	1.2 km	MPC · JPL
730515	2012 HL_{101}	—	February 28, 2008	Mount Lemmon	Mount Lemmon Survey	·	990 m	MPC · JPL
730516	2012 HG_{104}	—	April 16, 2012	Kitt Peak	Spacewatch	·	1.1 km	MPC · JPL
730517	2012 HU_{110}	—	April 27, 2012	Haleakala	Pan-STARRS 1	VER	1.8 km	MPC · JPL
730518	2012 JR_{3}	—	February 5, 2010	WISE	WISE	·	3.1 km	MPC · JPL
730519	2012 JX_{4}	—	March 17, 2004	Apache Point	SDSS Collaboration	H	480 m	MPC · JPL
730520	2012 JT_{5}	—	January 27, 2011	Mount Lemmon	Mount Lemmon Survey	·	2.4 km	MPC · JPL
730521	2012 JZ_{5}	—	September 25, 2008	Mount Lemmon	Mount Lemmon Survey	·	3.1 km	MPC · JPL
730522	2012 JP_{6}	—	September 1, 2005	Kitt Peak	Spacewatch	NYS	830 m	MPC · JPL
730523	2012 JM_{7}	—	October 19, 2003	Apache Point	SDSS Collaboration	·	4.0 km	MPC · JPL
730524	2012 JW_{9}	—	May 13, 2012	Mount Lemmon	Mount Lemmon Survey	PHO	790 m	MPC · JPL
730525	2012 JQ_{11}	—	January 12, 2010	WISE	WISE	L4 · HEK	10 km	MPC · JPL
730526	2012 JL_{12}	—	September 30, 2003	Kitt Peak	Spacewatch	EOS	1.8 km	MPC · JPL
730527	2012 JE_{14}	—	May 15, 2012	Mount Lemmon	Mount Lemmon Survey	·	760 m	MPC · JPL
730528	2012 JV_{17}	—	April 24, 2012	Haleakala	Pan-STARRS 1	·	2.0 km	MPC · JPL
730529	2012 JM_{19}	—	November 16, 2009	Mount Lemmon	Mount Lemmon Survey	·	1.7 km	MPC · JPL
730530	2012 JP_{26}	—	February 12, 2004	Kitt Peak	Spacewatch	·	1.1 km	MPC · JPL
730531	2012 JL_{28}	—	September 28, 2003	Apache Point	SDSS Collaboration	·	2.4 km	MPC · JPL
730532	2012 JB_{30}	—	May 14, 2012	Haleakala	Pan-STARRS 1	·	730 m	MPC · JPL
730533	2012 JY_{32}	—	May 12, 2012	Haleakala	Pan-STARRS 1	·	610 m	MPC · JPL
730534	2012 JA_{39}	—	September 30, 2003	Kitt Peak	Spacewatch	·	3.2 km	MPC · JPL
730535	2012 JL_{39}	—	May 12, 2012	Mount Lemmon	Mount Lemmon Survey	GEF	1.2 km	MPC · JPL
730536	2012 JT_{40}	—	May 12, 2012	Haleakala	Pan-STARRS 1	·	1.2 km	MPC · JPL
730537	2012 JA_{41}	—	May 12, 2012	Haleakala	Pan-STARRS 1	·	2.6 km	MPC · JPL
730538	2012 JG_{42}	—	April 30, 2012	Mount Lemmon	Mount Lemmon Survey	·	1.5 km	MPC · JPL
730539	2012 JD_{44}	—	February 21, 2002	Kitt Peak	Spacewatch	·	650 m	MPC · JPL
730540	2012 JB_{49}	—	November 9, 2009	Kitt Peak	Spacewatch	·	2.4 km	MPC · JPL
730541	2012 JJ_{49}	—	February 12, 2010	WISE	WISE	(1118)	3.5 km	MPC · JPL
730542	2012 JH_{52}	—	May 14, 2012	Haleakala	Pan-STARRS 1	·	940 m	MPC · JPL
730543	2012 JP_{52}	—	October 5, 2002	Apache Point	SDSS Collaboration	·	1.2 km	MPC · JPL
730544	2012 JJ_{55}	—	March 1, 2008	Kitt Peak	Spacewatch	·	920 m	MPC · JPL
730545	2012 JO_{56}	—	April 28, 2012	Mount Lemmon	Mount Lemmon Survey	EOS	1.3 km	MPC · JPL
730546	2012 JK_{60}	—	May 13, 2012	Mount Lemmon	Mount Lemmon Survey	EOS	1.7 km	MPC · JPL
730547	2012 JN_{60}	—	May 14, 2012	Kitt Peak	Spacewatch	EOS	1.4 km	MPC · JPL
730548	2012 JQ_{62}	—	March 29, 2012	Kitt Peak	Spacewatch	·	1.7 km	MPC · JPL
730549	2012 JF_{67}	—	September 19, 2014	Haleakala	Pan-STARRS 1	·	2.6 km	MPC · JPL
730550	2012 JE_{68}	—	May 13, 2012	Mount Lemmon	Mount Lemmon Survey	·	1.4 km	MPC · JPL
730551	2012 JW_{68}	—	May 15, 2012	Haleakala	Pan-STARRS 1	THM	2.2 km	MPC · JPL
730552	2012 JP_{69}	—	July 13, 2013	Haleakala	Pan-STARRS 1	·	2.5 km	MPC · JPL
730553	2012 KO	—	September 23, 2009	Mount Lemmon	Mount Lemmon Survey	L4	10 km	MPC · JPL
730554	2012 KD_{3}	—	May 17, 2012	Mount Lemmon	Mount Lemmon Survey	·	750 m	MPC · JPL
730555	2012 KR_{5}	—	May 1, 2003	Kitt Peak	Spacewatch	·	2.5 km	MPC · JPL
730556	2012 KS_{5}	—	September 26, 2003	Apache Point	SDSS Collaboration	·	1.7 km	MPC · JPL
730557	2012 KU_{7}	—	October 7, 2004	Anderson Mesa	LONEOS	·	3.1 km	MPC · JPL
730558	2012 KR_{9}	—	November 27, 2009	Mount Lemmon	Mount Lemmon Survey	·	2.4 km	MPC · JPL
730559	2012 KS_{13}	—	September 29, 2008	Kitt Peak	Spacewatch	·	2.5 km	MPC · JPL
730560	2012 KX_{15}	—	October 10, 2002	Apache Point	SDSS Collaboration	·	2.9 km	MPC · JPL
730561	2012 KA_{16}	—	February 13, 2008	Kitt Peak	Spacewatch	·	990 m	MPC · JPL
730562	2012 KF_{17}	—	May 20, 2012	Mount Lemmon	Mount Lemmon Survey	·	880 m	MPC · JPL
730563	2012 KL_{19}	—	April 16, 2012	Kitt Peak	Spacewatch	·	2.5 km	MPC · JPL
730564	2012 KK_{20}	—	February 28, 2008	Mount Lemmon	Mount Lemmon Survey	MAS	610 m	MPC · JPL
730565	2012 KR_{23}	—	May 11, 2012	Kitt Peak	Spacewatch	·	1.2 km	MPC · JPL
730566	2012 KW_{24}	—	March 20, 1999	Apache Point	SDSS Collaboration	·	1.5 km	MPC · JPL
730567	2012 KG_{25}	—	November 18, 2009	Mount Lemmon	Mount Lemmon Survey	·	4.1 km	MPC · JPL
730568	2012 KV_{25}	—	May 16, 2012	Mount Lemmon	Mount Lemmon Survey	·	1.7 km	MPC · JPL
730569	2012 KH_{27}	—	October 1, 2009	Mount Lemmon	Mount Lemmon Survey	·	2.5 km	MPC · JPL
730570	2012 KC_{29}	—	March 7, 2010	WISE	WISE	·	3.1 km	MPC · JPL
730571	2012 KL_{29}	—	November 1, 2005	Mount Lemmon	Mount Lemmon Survey	·	1.4 km	MPC · JPL
730572	2012 KL_{31}	—	April 20, 2012	Mount Lemmon	Mount Lemmon Survey	EMA	2.2 km	MPC · JPL
730573	2012 KY_{32}	—	August 15, 2009	Kitt Peak	Spacewatch	·	730 m	MPC · JPL
730574	2012 KA_{33}	—	October 14, 2009	Mount Lemmon	Mount Lemmon Survey	EOS	1.8 km	MPC · JPL
730575	2012 KL_{33}	—	August 5, 2008	La Sagra	OAM	·	2.4 km	MPC · JPL
730576	2012 KK_{35}	—	October 2, 2003	Kitt Peak	Spacewatch	·	1.6 km	MPC · JPL
730577	2012 KG_{36}	—	January 28, 2010	WISE	WISE	KON	2.0 km	MPC · JPL
730578	2012 KG_{41}	—	October 17, 2003	Kitt Peak	Spacewatch	·	3.1 km	MPC · JPL
730579	2012 KO_{42}	—	April 2, 2006	Mount Lemmon	Mount Lemmon Survey	·	3.9 km	MPC · JPL
730580	2012 KO_{47}	—	March 25, 2006	Palomar	NEAT	·	4.2 km	MPC · JPL
730581	2012 KQ_{47}	—	May 19, 2012	Kitt Peak	Spacewatch	·	2.1 km	MPC · JPL
730582	2012 KS_{47}	—	February 12, 2011	Kitt Peak	Spacewatch	·	2.4 km	MPC · JPL
730583	2012 KU_{47}	—	May 28, 2012	San Pedro de Atacama	I. de la Cueva	NYS	930 m	MPC · JPL
730584	2012 KF_{50}	—	May 31, 2012	Mount Lemmon	Mount Lemmon Survey	·	760 m	MPC · JPL
730585	2012 KR_{54}	—	May 16, 2012	Haleakala	Pan-STARRS 1	·	1.7 km	MPC · JPL
730586	2012 KM_{56}	—	May 24, 2010	WISE	WISE	·	3.6 km	MPC · JPL
730587	2012 KF_{59}	—	December 11, 2009	Mount Lemmon	Mount Lemmon Survey	·	2.0 km	MPC · JPL
730588	2012 KX_{59}	—	February 10, 2011	Mount Lemmon	Mount Lemmon Survey	EOS	1.4 km	MPC · JPL
730589	2012 KJ_{64}	—	May 21, 2012	Mount Lemmon	Mount Lemmon Survey	·	2.9 km	MPC · JPL
730590	2012 KP_{64}	—	May 29, 2012	Mount Lemmon	Mount Lemmon Survey	·	1.0 km	MPC · JPL
730591	2012 LO	—	February 7, 2011	Mount Lemmon	Mount Lemmon Survey	·	1.2 km	MPC · JPL
730592	2012 LK_{3}	—	September 14, 2002	Palomar	R. Matson	·	4.0 km	MPC · JPL
730593	2012 LN_{3}	—	April 14, 2008	Kitt Peak	Spacewatch	NYS	1.0 km	MPC · JPL
730594	2012 LW_{5}	—	February 9, 2010	WISE	WISE	·	3.0 km	MPC · JPL
730595	2012 LO_{7}	—	September 4, 2007	Mount Lemmon	Mount Lemmon Survey	·	2.4 km	MPC · JPL
730596	2012 LV_{7}	—	July 14, 1996	Haleakala-NEAT/GEO	NEAT	·	3.3 km	MPC · JPL
730597	2012 LH_{12}	—	October 31, 2005	Mauna Kea	A. Boattini	TEL	4.3 km	MPC · JPL
730598	2012 LX_{13}	—	June 11, 2012	Cerro Burek	I. de la Cueva	·	2.9 km	MPC · JPL
730599	2012 LA_{15}	—	June 8, 2012	Haleakala	Pan-STARRS 1	TIR	2.2 km	MPC · JPL
730600	2012 LC_{16}	—	November 25, 2009	Mount Lemmon	Mount Lemmon Survey	·	2.6 km	MPC · JPL

== 730601–730700 ==
back to top

Designation			Discovery			Properties		Ref
Permanent	Provisional	Named after	Date	Site	Discoverer(s)	Category	Diam.	Ref
730601	2012 LG_{18}	—	May 21, 2012	Haleakala	Pan-STARRS 1	·	570 m	MPC · JPL
730602	2012 LL_{18}	—	April 23, 2004	Kitt Peak	Spacewatch	·	1.2 km	MPC · JPL
730603	2012 LY_{19}	—	June 9, 2012	Mount Lemmon	Mount Lemmon Survey	·	2.5 km	MPC · JPL
730604	2012 LX_{25}	—	May 23, 2001	Cerro Tololo	Deep Ecliptic Survey	·	2.9 km	MPC · JPL
730605	2012 LC_{28}	—	October 1, 2014	Haleakala	Pan-STARRS 1	·	2.5 km	MPC · JPL
730606	2012 LH_{31}	—	June 1, 2012	Mount Lemmon	Mount Lemmon Survey	·	2.7 km	MPC · JPL
730607	2012 LJ_{31}	—	June 14, 2012	Mount Lemmon	Mount Lemmon Survey	LIX	2.9 km	MPC · JPL
730608	2012 MX_{1}	—	June 16, 2012	Mount Lemmon	Mount Lemmon Survey	·	2.4 km	MPC · JPL
730609	2012 MM_{5}	—	April 15, 2010	WISE	WISE	T_{j} (2.99)	4.5 km	MPC · JPL
730610	2012 MW_{6}	—	September 28, 2008	Mount Lemmon	Mount Lemmon Survey	·	3.0 km	MPC · JPL
730611	2012 MH_{9}	—	April 1, 2010	WISE	WISE	·	4.2 km	MPC · JPL
730612	2012 MK_{10}	—	February 4, 2005	Catalina	CSS	·	3.7 km	MPC · JPL
730613	2012 MQ_{11}	—	August 11, 2004	Palomar	NEAT	·	4.1 km	MPC · JPL
730614	2012 MC_{14}	—	May 9, 2006	Mount Lemmon	Mount Lemmon Survey	LIX	3.2 km	MPC · JPL
730615	2012 MD_{14}	—	May 14, 2004	Kitt Peak	Spacewatch	NYS	850 m	MPC · JPL
730616	2012 MR_{15}	—	April 29, 2003	Apache Point	SDSS Collaboration	H	620 m	MPC · JPL
730617	2012 MQ_{17}	—	February 9, 2010	Catalina	CSS	·	3.4 km	MPC · JPL
730618	2012 OQ_{3}	—	July 11, 2005	Kitt Peak	Spacewatch	·	660 m	MPC · JPL
730619	2012 OA_{4}	—	May 25, 2011	Nogales	M. Schwartz, P. R. Holvorcem	·	3.3 km	MPC · JPL
730620	2012 PO_{2}	—	December 30, 1999	Mauna Kea	C. Veillet, I. Gable	·	660 m	MPC · JPL
730621	2012 PY_{2}	—	May 11, 2005	Palomar	NEAT	·	3.2 km	MPC · JPL
730622	2012 PW_{6}	—	April 7, 2010	WISE	WISE	·	2.6 km	MPC · JPL
730623	2012 PO_{9}	—	August 8, 2012	Haleakala	Pan-STARRS 1	·	2.5 km	MPC · JPL
730624	2012 PE_{12}	—	January 2, 2003	La Silla	Heidelberg InfraRed/Optical Cluster Survey	·	2.6 km	MPC · JPL
730625	2012 PL_{15}	—	September 10, 2001	Socorro	LINEAR	·	4.3 km	MPC · JPL
730626	2012 PD_{17}	—	May 3, 2011	Mount Lemmon	Mount Lemmon Survey	·	3.8 km	MPC · JPL
730627	2012 PJ_{20}	—	August 14, 2001	Haleakala	NEAT	·	3.9 km	MPC · JPL
730628	2012 PQ_{20}	—	February 5, 2010	WISE	WISE	PHO	1.9 km	MPC · JPL
730629	2012 PZ_{20}	—	September 24, 2008	Mount Lemmon	Mount Lemmon Survey	KON	2.4 km	MPC · JPL
730630	2012 PU_{21}	—	August 13, 2012	Haleakala	Pan-STARRS 1	·	2.2 km	MPC · JPL
730631	2012 PL_{27}	—	August 13, 2012	Haleakala	Pan-STARRS 1	·	1.3 km	MPC · JPL
730632	2012 PH_{28}	—	April 25, 2003	Apache Point	SDSS Collaboration	·	2.0 km	MPC · JPL
730633	2012 PT_{29}	—	August 13, 2012	Haleakala	Pan-STARRS 1	·	1.9 km	MPC · JPL
730634	2012 PD_{30}	—	October 24, 2005	Mauna Kea	A. Boattini	EUN	4.4 km	MPC · JPL
730635	2012 PQ_{32}	—	November 24, 2003	Palomar	NEAT	·	2.7 km	MPC · JPL
730636	2012 PZ_{33}	—	November 13, 2002	Palomar	NEAT	·	4.0 km	MPC · JPL
730637	2012 PO_{35}	—	August 12, 2012	Siding Spring	SSS	·	1.2 km	MPC · JPL
730638	2012 PA_{44}	—	September 25, 2008	Mount Lemmon	Mount Lemmon Survey	·	950 m	MPC · JPL
730639	2012 PE_{45}	—	August 14, 2012	Kitt Peak	Spacewatch	·	3.2 km	MPC · JPL
730640	2012 PM_{45}	—	August 13, 2012	Haleakala	Pan-STARRS 1	·	800 m	MPC · JPL
730641	2012 PR_{45}	—	May 15, 2010	WISE	WISE	VER	3.3 km	MPC · JPL
730642	2012 PA_{50}	—	May 26, 2010	WISE	WISE	·	1.8 km	MPC · JPL
730643	2012 PV_{53}	—	August 10, 2012	Kitt Peak	Spacewatch	EOS	1.7 km	MPC · JPL
730644	2012 PX_{53}	—	August 13, 2012	Kitt Peak	Spacewatch	·	1.5 km	MPC · JPL
730645	2012 PW_{57}	—	October 12, 2007	Mount Lemmon	Mount Lemmon Survey	·	2.5 km	MPC · JPL
730646	2012 PA_{58}	—	August 13, 2012	Kitt Peak	Spacewatch	·	1.5 km	MPC · JPL
730647	2012 QG_{1}	—	August 11, 2012	Mayhill-ISON	L. Elenin	·	900 m	MPC · JPL
730648	2012 QP_{1}	—	August 16, 2012	ESA OGS	ESA OGS	·	1.7 km	MPC · JPL
730649	2012 QB_{3}	—	September 13, 2007	Mount Lemmon	Mount Lemmon Survey	·	2.1 km	MPC · JPL
730650	2012 QG_{3}	—	August 16, 2012	ESA OGS	ESA OGS	·	2.6 km	MPC · JPL
730651	2012 QS_{3}	—	August 16, 2012	ESA OGS	ESA OGS	·	940 m	MPC · JPL
730652	2012 QY_{5}	—	March 11, 2007	Kitt Peak	Spacewatch	NYS	1.3 km	MPC · JPL
730653	2012 QZ_{5}	—	December 29, 2005	Palomar	NEAT	·	1.3 km	MPC · JPL
730654	2012 QE_{10}	—	August 19, 2012	Črni Vrh	Mikuž, B.	·	3.9 km	MPC · JPL
730655	2012 QK_{12}	—	January 19, 2004	Kitt Peak	Spacewatch	·	3.2 km	MPC · JPL
730656	2012 QZ_{13}	—	July 21, 2006	Lulin	LUSS	·	3.2 km	MPC · JPL
730657	2012 QZ_{18}	—	May 7, 2005	Mount Lemmon	Mount Lemmon Survey	·	2.3 km	MPC · JPL
730658	2012 QC_{19}	—	March 14, 2004	Kitt Peak	Spacewatch	(2076)	750 m	MPC · JPL
730659	2012 QU_{20}	—	October 15, 2001	Palomar	NEAT	PHO	1.0 km	MPC · JPL
730660	2012 QK_{22}	—	April 2, 2010	WISE	WISE	L5	10 km	MPC · JPL
730661	2012 QJ_{31}	—	December 28, 2005	Catalina	CSS	EUN	1.6 km	MPC · JPL
730662	2012 QX_{31}	—	August 25, 2012	Kitt Peak	Spacewatch	·	1.9 km	MPC · JPL
730663	2012 QT_{36}	—	July 10, 2005	Kitt Peak	Spacewatch	SYL	5.0 km	MPC · JPL
730664	2012 QE_{38}	—	August 25, 2012	Haleakala	Pan-STARRS 1	·	950 m	MPC · JPL
730665	2012 QN_{38}	—	August 25, 2012	Haleakala	Pan-STARRS 1	L5	7.0 km	MPC · JPL
730666	2012 QN_{43}	—	May 13, 2010	WISE	WISE	·	3.2 km	MPC · JPL
730667	2012 QN_{44}	—	July 23, 2012	Kislovodsk	ISON-Kislovodsk Observatory	·	2.9 km	MPC · JPL
730668	2012 QS_{44}	—	August 28, 2003	Palomar	NEAT	·	2.0 km	MPC · JPL
730669	2012 QJ_{46}	—	September 12, 2007	Mount Lemmon	Mount Lemmon Survey	VER	2.5 km	MPC · JPL
730670	2012 QD_{53}	—	August 12, 2012	Westfield	International Astronomical Search Collaboration	·	1.1 km	MPC · JPL
730671	2012 QM_{54}	—	October 10, 2007	Mount Lemmon	Mount Lemmon Survey	·	2.8 km	MPC · JPL
730672	2012 QZ_{59}	—	September 13, 1996	Kitt Peak	Spacewatch	THM	1.7 km	MPC · JPL
730673	2012 QB_{67}	—	August 26, 2012	Haleakala	Pan-STARRS 1	·	1.2 km	MPC · JPL
730674	2012 QC_{68}	—	August 26, 2012	Haleakala	Pan-STARRS 1	·	710 m	MPC · JPL
730675	2012 QA_{69}	—	August 26, 2012	Kitt Peak	Spacewatch	·	1.7 km	MPC · JPL
730676	2012 QS_{69}	—	August 26, 2012	Haleakala	Pan-STARRS 1	L5	6.9 km	MPC · JPL
730677	2012 QT_{72}	—	August 26, 2012	Haleakala	Pan-STARRS 1	·	2.7 km	MPC · JPL
730678	2012 RE_{6}	—	September 30, 2003	Kitt Peak	Spacewatch	GEF	1.2 km	MPC · JPL
730679	2012 RW_{6}	—	September 5, 2000	Apache Point	SDSS Collaboration	L5	10 km	MPC · JPL
730680	2012 RZ_{6}	—	August 26, 2012	Haleakala	Pan-STARRS 1	ERI	1.2 km	MPC · JPL
730681	2012 RD_{9}	—	September 9, 2012	Črni Vrh	Mikuž, B.	·	1.7 km	MPC · JPL
730682	2012 RL_{9}	—	September 11, 2012	Alder Springs	K. Levin, N. Teamo	·	2.0 km	MPC · JPL
730683	2012 RE_{13}	—	September 13, 2012	Mount Lemmon	Mount Lemmon Survey	·	1.2 km	MPC · JPL
730684	2012 RH_{21}	—	August 23, 2001	Kitt Peak	Spacewatch	·	3.0 km	MPC · JPL
730685	2012 RT_{23}	—	September 14, 2012	Kitt Peak	Spacewatch	·	860 m	MPC · JPL
730686	2012 RZ_{24}	—	September 14, 2012	ESA OGS	ESA OGS	·	2.7 km	MPC · JPL
730687	2012 RD_{28}	—	October 31, 2008	Catalina	CSS	·	1.3 km	MPC · JPL
730688	2012 RT_{28}	—	August 16, 2006	Siding Spring	SSS	·	4.3 km	MPC · JPL
730689	2012 RF_{36}	—	April 13, 2011	Haleakala	Pan-STARRS 1	·	2.8 km	MPC · JPL
730690	2012 RC_{37}	—	September 21, 2001	Apache Point	SDSS Collaboration	L5	9.4 km	MPC · JPL
730691	2012 RC_{47}	—	July 29, 2000	Lake Tekapo	I. P. Griffin	·	2.6 km	MPC · JPL
730692	2012 RE_{47}	—	June 8, 2010	WISE	WISE	·	3.6 km	MPC · JPL
730693	2012 RR_{48}	—	September 15, 2012	Mount Lemmon	Mount Lemmon Survey	ELF	2.9 km	MPC · JPL
730694	2012 RJ_{49}	—	September 13, 2012	Mount Lemmon	Mount Lemmon Survey	·	1.1 km	MPC · JPL
730695	2012 SJ	—	August 30, 1995	Haleakala	AMOS	·	2.1 km	MPC · JPL
730696	2012 SG_{4}	—	October 10, 2002	Apache Point	SDSS Collaboration	KOR	1.5 km	MPC · JPL
730697	2012 SX_{4}	—	January 24, 2010	WISE	WISE	·	1.9 km	MPC · JPL
730698	2012 SQ_{7}	—	April 10, 2010	Mount Lemmon	Mount Lemmon Survey	·	3.1 km	MPC · JPL
730699	2012 SL_{20}	—	January 29, 2010	WISE	WISE	ARM	4.0 km	MPC · JPL
730700	2012 SO_{20}	—	August 16, 2006	Palomar	NEAT	·	3.2 km	MPC · JPL

== 730701–730800 ==
back to top

Designation			Discovery			Properties		Ref
Permanent	Provisional	Named after	Date	Site	Discoverer(s)	Category	Diam.	Ref
730701	2012 SM_{24}	—	September 17, 2012	Mount Lemmon	Mount Lemmon Survey	·	1.5 km	MPC · JPL
730702	2012 SM_{25}	—	May 1, 1998	Kitt Peak	Spacewatch	·	1.5 km	MPC · JPL
730703	2012 SG_{26}	—	September 17, 2012	Mount Lemmon	Mount Lemmon Survey	·	2.4 km	MPC · JPL
730704	2012 SQ_{28}	—	October 10, 2008	Mount Lemmon	Mount Lemmon Survey	·	840 m	MPC · JPL
730705	2012 SD_{32}	—	February 3, 2008	Kitt Peak	Spacewatch	·	920 m	MPC · JPL
730706	2012 SA_{40}	—	August 25, 2012	Westfield	International Astronomical Search Collaboration	AGN	1.2 km	MPC · JPL
730707	2012 SQ_{41}	—	March 19, 2010	Mount Lemmon	Mount Lemmon Survey	·	2.9 km	MPC · JPL
730708	2012 SJ_{43}	—	October 8, 2007	Kitt Peak	Spacewatch	·	2.5 km	MPC · JPL
730709	2012 SM_{44}	—	May 5, 2010	WISE	WISE	·	1.5 km	MPC · JPL
730710	2012 SW_{45}	—	September 19, 2003	Kitt Peak	Spacewatch	·	1.6 km	MPC · JPL
730711	2012 SW_{51}	—	September 19, 2012	Mount Lemmon	Mount Lemmon Survey	·	1.5 km	MPC · JPL
730712	2012 SD_{53}	—	May 20, 2005	Palomar	NEAT	·	3.8 km	MPC · JPL
730713	2012 ST_{54}	—	September 19, 2012	Mount Lemmon	Mount Lemmon Survey	·	3.4 km	MPC · JPL
730714	2012 SQ_{57}	—	September 30, 2003	Kitt Peak	Spacewatch	·	2.1 km	MPC · JPL
730715	2012 SK_{58}	—	May 11, 2010	WISE	WISE	·	3.4 km	MPC · JPL
730716	2012 SU_{63}	—	September 30, 2003	Kitt Peak	Spacewatch	·	2.4 km	MPC · JPL
730717	2012 SS_{64}	—	September 16, 2003	Kitt Peak	Spacewatch	·	1.6 km	MPC · JPL
730718	2012 SL_{67}	—	September 17, 2012	Kitt Peak	Spacewatch	AST	1.4 km	MPC · JPL
730719	2012 SP_{73}	—	June 30, 2010	WISE	WISE	·	2.0 km	MPC · JPL
730720	2012 SX_{74}	—	May 17, 2010	WISE	WISE	·	1.6 km	MPC · JPL
730721	2012 SC_{80}	—	May 7, 2010	WISE	WISE	L5	8.4 km	MPC · JPL
730722	2012 SX_{85}	—	September 19, 2012	Mount Lemmon	Mount Lemmon Survey	L5	6.8 km	MPC · JPL
730723	2012 SN_{86}	—	September 19, 2012	Mount Lemmon	Mount Lemmon Survey	·	2.4 km	MPC · JPL
730724	2012 SO_{86}	—	September 19, 2012	Mount Lemmon	Mount Lemmon Survey	·	3.0 km	MPC · JPL
730725	2012 SU_{87}	—	September 21, 2012	Mount Lemmon	Mount Lemmon Survey	·	1.5 km	MPC · JPL
730726	2012 SY_{96}	—	September 18, 2012	Mount Lemmon	Mount Lemmon Survey	·	1.3 km	MPC · JPL
730727	2012 SU_{103}	—	September 17, 2012	Mount Lemmon	Mount Lemmon Survey	L5	6.2 km	MPC · JPL
730728	2012 TE_{3}	—	January 21, 2010	WISE	WISE	·	2.5 km	MPC · JPL
730729	2012 TZ_{3}	—	March 2, 2006	Kitt Peak	Spacewatch	L5	8.5 km	MPC · JPL
730730	2012 TN_{5}	—	September 5, 2000	Apache Point	SDSS Collaboration	L5	10 km	MPC · JPL
730731	2012 TH_{10}	—	August 27, 2001	Palomar	NEAT	·	4.4 km	MPC · JPL
730732	2012 TL_{15}	—	October 31, 2005	Mauna Kea	A. Boattini	L5	8.7 km	MPC · JPL
730733	2012 TK_{20}	—	September 20, 2011	Haleakala	Pan-STARRS 1	L5	6.7 km	MPC · JPL
730734	2012 TF_{24}	—	October 10, 2008	Mount Lemmon	Mount Lemmon Survey	·	890 m	MPC · JPL
730735	2012 TL_{24}	—	October 8, 2012	Mount Lemmon	Mount Lemmon Survey	·	2.2 km	MPC · JPL
730736	2012 TT_{29}	—	September 26, 2003	Apache Point	SDSS Collaboration	MRX	1.0 km	MPC · JPL
730737	2012 TO_{30}	—	September 12, 2002	Palomar	NEAT	·	660 m	MPC · JPL
730738	2012 TU_{33}	—	November 12, 2001	Apache Point	SDSS Collaboration	·	2.4 km	MPC · JPL
730739	2012 TL_{37}	—	September 14, 2002	Palomar	NEAT	·	790 m	MPC · JPL
730740	2012 TP_{43}	—	September 16, 2012	Kitt Peak	Spacewatch	·	1.4 km	MPC · JPL
730741	2012 TS_{45}	—	September 29, 2008	Mount Lemmon	Mount Lemmon Survey	·	850 m	MPC · JPL
730742	2012 TA_{50}	—	October 8, 2012	Haleakala	Pan-STARRS 1	·	770 m	MPC · JPL
730743	2012 TK_{56}	—	August 23, 2003	Palomar	NEAT	·	1.5 km	MPC · JPL
730744	2012 TU_{56}	—	September 7, 2008	Mount Lemmon	Mount Lemmon Survey	·	1.5 km	MPC · JPL
730745	2012 TP_{59}	—	October 8, 2012	Mount Lemmon	Mount Lemmon Survey	·	2.0 km	MPC · JPL
730746	2012 TM_{60}	—	April 4, 2010	WISE	WISE	·	1.5 km	MPC · JPL
730747	2012 TZ_{61}	—	October 8, 2012	Haleakala	Pan-STARRS 1	·	3.2 km	MPC · JPL
730748	2012 TY_{63}	—	February 9, 2005	Kitt Peak	Spacewatch	·	2.6 km	MPC · JPL
730749	2012 TX_{64}	—	May 16, 2005	Palomar	NEAT	·	2.9 km	MPC · JPL
730750	2012 TL_{73}	—	January 26, 2004	Anderson Mesa	LONEOS	·	4.1 km	MPC · JPL
730751	2012 TE_{75}	—	March 13, 2010	Mount Lemmon	Mount Lemmon Survey	HOF	2.4 km	MPC · JPL
730752	2012 TJ_{80}	—	October 12, 2007	Mount Lemmon	Mount Lemmon Survey	·	2.6 km	MPC · JPL
730753	2012 TK_{80}	—	September 26, 2008	Kitt Peak	Spacewatch	·	1.0 km	MPC · JPL
730754	2012 TM_{81}	—	October 5, 2012	Haleakala	Pan-STARRS 1	KOR	990 m	MPC · JPL
730755	2012 TQ_{81}	—	October 5, 2012	Haleakala	Pan-STARRS 1	L5	8.3 km	MPC · JPL
730756	2012 TQ_{83}	—	October 6, 2012	Mount Lemmon	Mount Lemmon Survey	SYL	3.3 km	MPC · JPL
730757	2012 TS_{85}	—	August 18, 2002	Palomar	NEAT	·	520 m	MPC · JPL
730758	2012 TW_{88}	—	October 6, 2012	Mount Lemmon	Mount Lemmon Survey	·	720 m	MPC · JPL
730759	2012 TS_{96}	—	January 4, 2003	Kitt Peak	Deep Lens Survey	·	2.5 km	MPC · JPL
730760	2012 TD_{100}	—	September 19, 2003	Palomar	NEAT	·	1.9 km	MPC · JPL
730761	2012 TH_{100}	—	August 22, 2006	Palomar	NEAT	·	3.1 km	MPC · JPL
730762	2012 TJ_{103}	—	October 9, 2012	Mount Lemmon	Mount Lemmon Survey	AGN	1.1 km	MPC · JPL
730763	2012 TS_{105}	—	October 9, 2012	Mount Lemmon	Mount Lemmon Survey	·	800 m	MPC · JPL
730764	2012 TD_{107}	—	January 23, 2006	Kitt Peak	Spacewatch	·	1.2 km	MPC · JPL
730765	2012 TJ_{114}	—	September 19, 2003	Palomar	NEAT	·	3.0 km	MPC · JPL
730766	2012 TB_{118}	—	October 10, 2012	Mount Lemmon	Mount Lemmon Survey	·	1.0 km	MPC · JPL
730767	2012 TJ_{118}	—	September 13, 2002	Palomar	NEAT	·	620 m	MPC · JPL
730768	2012 TG_{120}	—	October 10, 2012	Mount Lemmon	Mount Lemmon Survey	MAR	680 m	MPC · JPL
730769	2012 TZ_{122}	—	October 8, 2012	Haleakala	Pan-STARRS 1	L5	8.5 km	MPC · JPL
730770	2012 TX_{123}	—	January 7, 2006	Mount Lemmon	Mount Lemmon Survey	L5	9.9 km	MPC · JPL
730771	2012 TZ_{123}	—	October 9, 2012	Mount Lemmon	Mount Lemmon Survey	L5	6.0 km	MPC · JPL
730772	2012 TB_{125}	—	October 8, 2012	Kitt Peak	Spacewatch	·	1.4 km	MPC · JPL
730773	2012 TO_{126}	—	October 16, 2003	Kitt Peak	Spacewatch	AST	2.8 km	MPC · JPL
730774	2012 TQ_{126}	—	September 5, 2000	Apache Point	SDSS Collaboration	L5	9.3 km	MPC · JPL
730775	2012 TQ_{131}	—	November 12, 2007	Mount Lemmon	Mount Lemmon Survey	·	2.0 km	MPC · JPL
730776	2012 TW_{132}	—	October 2, 2006	Mount Lemmon	Mount Lemmon Survey	·	3.3 km	MPC · JPL
730777	2012 TZ_{132}	—	March 21, 1999	Apache Point	SDSS Collaboration	·	3.9 km	MPC · JPL
730778	2012 TC_{140}	—	October 11, 2012	Haleakala	Pan-STARRS 1	L5	6.1 km	MPC · JPL
730779	2012 TQ_{140}	—	September 23, 2012	Mount Lemmon	Mount Lemmon Survey	L5	6.3 km	MPC · JPL
730780	2012 TS_{142}	—	October 23, 2008	Mount Lemmon	Mount Lemmon Survey	·	650 m	MPC · JPL
730781	2012 TC_{146}	—	September 24, 2012	Kitt Peak	Spacewatch	L5	7.1 km	MPC · JPL
730782	2012 TP_{146}	—	October 24, 2003	Apache Point	SDSS Collaboration	L5	10 km	MPC · JPL
730783	2012 TX_{147}	—	May 4, 2008	Kitt Peak	Spacewatch	L5	9.5 km	MPC · JPL
730784	2012 TU_{150}	—	October 11, 1999	Kitt Peak	Spacewatch	·	1.1 km	MPC · JPL
730785	2012 TT_{156}	—	September 27, 2003	Kitt Peak	Spacewatch	·	1.4 km	MPC · JPL
730786	2012 TX_{157}	—	October 8, 2007	Mount Lemmon	Mount Lemmon Survey	·	1.7 km	MPC · JPL
730787	2012 TK_{162}	—	September 23, 2012	Kitt Peak	Spacewatch	·	2.4 km	MPC · JPL
730788	2012 TQ_{162}	—	October 8, 2012	Haleakala	Pan-STARRS 1	·	1.5 km	MPC · JPL
730789	2012 TR_{162}	—	October 18, 2003	Kitt Peak	Spacewatch	·	1.2 km	MPC · JPL
730790	2012 TG_{166}	—	September 27, 2008	Mount Lemmon	Mount Lemmon Survey	·	1.2 km	MPC · JPL
730791	2012 TR_{168}	—	August 19, 2002	Palomar	NEAT	·	550 m	MPC · JPL
730792	2012 TS_{172}	—	October 9, 2012	Mount Lemmon	Mount Lemmon Survey	·	2.5 km	MPC · JPL
730793	2012 TV_{177}	—	July 29, 2008	Mount Lemmon	Mount Lemmon Survey	·	1.1 km	MPC · JPL
730794	2012 TL_{182}	—	March 9, 2007	Mount Lemmon	Mount Lemmon Survey	L5	7.3 km	MPC · JPL
730795	2012 TF_{196}	—	October 6, 2012	Kitt Peak	Spacewatch	·	1.1 km	MPC · JPL
730796	2012 TV_{202}	—	October 11, 2012	Mount Lemmon	Mount Lemmon Survey	·	740 m	MPC · JPL
730797	2012 TL_{208}	—	September 18, 2003	Palomar	NEAT	·	1.5 km	MPC · JPL
730798	2012 TB_{211}	—	January 6, 2010	Kitt Peak	Spacewatch	·	540 m	MPC · JPL
730799	2012 TF_{211}	—	October 2, 2008	Mount Lemmon	Mount Lemmon Survey	·	880 m	MPC · JPL
730800	2012 TM_{211}	—	March 30, 2008	Kitt Peak	Spacewatch	L5	9.2 km	MPC · JPL

== 730801–730900 ==
back to top

Designation			Discovery			Properties		Ref
Permanent	Provisional	Named after	Date	Site	Discoverer(s)	Category	Diam.	Ref
730801	2012 TN_{219}	—	February 15, 2000	Kitt Peak	Spacewatch	·	2.9 km	MPC · JPL
730802	2012 TZ_{219}	—	April 16, 2007	Mount Lemmon	Mount Lemmon Survey	L5	9.1 km	MPC · JPL
730803	2012 TC_{227}	—	October 3, 2008	Mount Lemmon	Mount Lemmon Survey	·	1.1 km	MPC · JPL
730804	2012 TK_{237}	—	September 19, 1998	Apache Point	SDSS Collaboration	AGN	990 m	MPC · JPL
730805	2012 TL_{243}	—	April 19, 2010	WISE	WISE	L5	7.4 km	MPC · JPL
730806	2012 TF_{244}	—	May 9, 2010	Mount Lemmon	Mount Lemmon Survey	·	3.7 km	MPC · JPL
730807	2012 TS_{245}	—	April 18, 2007	Mount Lemmon	Mount Lemmon Survey	L5	10 km	MPC · JPL
730808	2012 TV_{247}	—	October 20, 2003	Palomar	NEAT	PAD	2.9 km	MPC · JPL
730809	2012 TV_{249}	—	July 14, 2010	WISE	WISE	·	3.5 km	MPC · JPL
730810	2012 TO_{251}	—	October 11, 2012	Haleakala	Pan-STARRS 1	·	2.0 km	MPC · JPL
730811	2012 TP_{251}	—	March 19, 1999	Kitt Peak	Spacewatch	EOS	1.6 km	MPC · JPL
730812	2012 TM_{253}	—	October 11, 2012	Haleakala	Pan-STARRS 1	·	1.6 km	MPC · JPL
730813	2012 TB_{261}	—	October 29, 2008	Mount Lemmon	Mount Lemmon Survey	(5)	1.1 km	MPC · JPL
730814	2012 TC_{265}	—	October 8, 2008	Kitt Peak	Spacewatch	·	760 m	MPC · JPL
730815	2012 TT_{265}	—	October 8, 2012	Haleakala	Pan-STARRS 1	·	1.4 km	MPC · JPL
730816	2012 TU_{269}	—	April 3, 2008	Kitt Peak	Spacewatch	L5	7.0 km	MPC · JPL
730817	2012 TA_{270}	—	October 11, 2012	Mount Lemmon	Mount Lemmon Survey	·	1.7 km	MPC · JPL
730818	2012 TS_{271}	—	November 5, 2007	Kitt Peak	Spacewatch	·	2.6 km	MPC · JPL
730819	2012 TC_{274}	—	October 15, 2012	Mount Lemmon	Mount Lemmon Survey	·	1.1 km	MPC · JPL
730820	2012 TD_{277}	—	October 11, 2012	Haleakala	Pan-STARRS 1	·	920 m	MPC · JPL
730821	2012 TX_{279}	—	March 25, 2010	Kitt Peak	Spacewatch	·	2.3 km	MPC · JPL
730822	2012 TA_{280}	—	October 11, 2012	Haleakala	Pan-STARRS 1	·	890 m	MPC · JPL
730823	2012 TG_{281}	—	February 4, 2006	Kitt Peak	Spacewatch	·	1.2 km	MPC · JPL
730824	2012 TH_{282}	—	October 11, 2012	Piszkéstető	K. Sárneczky	·	2.7 km	MPC · JPL
730825	2012 TN_{282}	—	March 14, 2010	WISE	WISE	PHO	1.2 km	MPC · JPL
730826	2012 TT_{283}	—	August 17, 2001	Palomar	NEAT	·	2.4 km	MPC · JPL
730827	2012 TT_{285}	—	August 16, 2001	Palomar	NEAT	·	2.4 km	MPC · JPL
730828	2012 TB_{286}	—	September 16, 2012	Mount Lemmon	Mount Lemmon Survey	·	3.3 km	MPC · JPL
730829	2012 TW_{288}	—	September 17, 2003	Palomar	NEAT	·	2.1 km	MPC · JPL
730830	2012 TP_{289}	—	June 21, 2010	WISE	WISE	EUP	3.8 km	MPC · JPL
730831	2012 TQ_{293}	—	January 7, 2010	Kitt Peak	Spacewatch	·	950 m	MPC · JPL
730832	2012 TR_{293}	—	June 6, 2005	Kitt Peak	Spacewatch	LIX	3.8 km	MPC · JPL
730833	2012 TS_{297}	—	August 16, 2006	Palomar	NEAT	·	3.8 km	MPC · JPL
730834	2012 TO_{299}	—	March 3, 2000	Kitt Peak	Spacewatch	MAS	800 m	MPC · JPL
730835	2012 TT_{299}	—	September 23, 2012	Mount Lemmon	Mount Lemmon Survey	·	2.4 km	MPC · JPL
730836	2012 TN_{300}	—	October 14, 2012	Cerro Burek	I. de la Cueva	L5	7.5 km	MPC · JPL
730837	2012 TA_{305}	—	August 9, 2002	Cerro Tololo	Deep Ecliptic Survey	HOF	2.8 km	MPC · JPL
730838	2012 TK_{313}	—	November 1, 2007	Kitt Peak	Spacewatch	·	2.8 km	MPC · JPL
730839	2012 TB_{316}	—	July 4, 2010	WISE	WISE	·	2.7 km	MPC · JPL
730840	2012 TZ_{318}	—	September 17, 2006	Catalina	CSS	·	5.6 km	MPC · JPL
730841	2012 TJ_{322}	—	January 29, 2003	Palomar	NEAT	·	810 m	MPC · JPL
730842	2012 TK_{324}	—	September 25, 2012	Mount Lemmon	Mount Lemmon Survey	L5	7.4 km	MPC · JPL
730843	2012 TR_{324}	—	February 27, 2001	Kitt Peak	Spacewatch	3:2 · SHU	5.5 km	MPC · JPL
730844	2012 TR_{325}	—	May 13, 2011	Mount Lemmon	Mount Lemmon Survey	V	540 m	MPC · JPL
730845	2012 TC_{326}	—	January 25, 2009	Kitt Peak	Spacewatch	·	3.1 km	MPC · JPL
730846	2012 TP_{327}	—	January 14, 2008	Zelenchukskaya	Station, Zelenchukskaya	·	2.5 km	MPC · JPL
730847	2012 TN_{330}	—	October 7, 2012	Kitt Peak	Spacewatch	·	2.3 km	MPC · JPL
730848	2012 TW_{333}	—	April 18, 2015	Cerro Tololo-DECam	DECam	·	1.5 km	MPC · JPL
730849	2012 TO_{335}	—	June 8, 2010	WISE	WISE	·	2.0 km	MPC · JPL
730850	2012 TC_{336}	—	February 14, 2010	WISE	WISE	·	2.3 km	MPC · JPL
730851	2012 TK_{344}	—	January 23, 2010	WISE	WISE	·	2.5 km	MPC · JPL
730852	2012 TQ_{351}	—	October 11, 2012	Mount Lemmon	Mount Lemmon Survey	L5	6.7 km	MPC · JPL
730853	2012 TJ_{355}	—	October 10, 2012	Mount Lemmon	Mount Lemmon Survey	·	1.4 km	MPC · JPL
730854	2012 TW_{356}	—	October 10, 2012	Mount Lemmon	Mount Lemmon Survey	L5	7.4 km	MPC · JPL
730855	2012 TY_{356}	—	October 8, 2012	Kitt Peak	Spacewatch	·	2.9 km	MPC · JPL
730856	2012 TS_{360}	—	March 10, 2007	Mount Lemmon	Mount Lemmon Survey	3:2	4.5 km	MPC · JPL
730857	2012 TZ_{360}	—	October 6, 2012	Haleakala	Pan-STARRS 1	·	1.1 km	MPC · JPL
730858	2012 TJ_{363}	—	October 13, 2012	ESA OGS	ESA OGS	·	690 m	MPC · JPL
730859	2012 TP_{364}	—	October 11, 2012	Haleakala	Pan-STARRS 1	·	910 m	MPC · JPL
730860	2012 TH_{365}	—	October 11, 2012	Mount Lemmon	Mount Lemmon Survey	·	740 m	MPC · JPL
730861	2012 TE_{369}	—	October 15, 2012	Haleakala	Pan-STARRS 1	·	2.4 km	MPC · JPL
730862	2012 TQ_{374}	—	October 11, 2012	Haleakala	Pan-STARRS 1	·	2.1 km	MPC · JPL
730863	2012 TV_{386}	—	March 14, 2010	Kitt Peak	Spacewatch	·	1.1 km	MPC · JPL
730864	2012 TE_{391}	—	March 4, 2006	Kitt Peak	Spacewatch	L5	7.8 km	MPC · JPL
730865	2012 TZ_{398}	—	October 10, 2012	Mount Lemmon	Mount Lemmon Survey	·	2.3 km	MPC · JPL
730866	2012 US_{1}	—	October 8, 2012	Mount Lemmon	Mount Lemmon Survey	·	1.1 km	MPC · JPL
730867	2012 UW_{3}	—	February 21, 2007	Kitt Peak	Spacewatch	3:2	3.2 km	MPC · JPL
730868	2012 UF_{9}	—	November 29, 2003	Kitt Peak	Spacewatch	·	2.5 km	MPC · JPL
730869	2012 UH_{11}	—	October 16, 2012	Mount Lemmon	Mount Lemmon Survey	·	1.1 km	MPC · JPL
730870	2012 UO_{18}	—	August 29, 2011	Haleakala	Pan-STARRS 1	L5	7.9 km	MPC · JPL
730871	2012 UW_{18}	—	November 14, 2002	Kitt Peak	Spacewatch	·	810 m	MPC · JPL
730872	2012 UR_{19}	—	October 8, 2012	Mount Lemmon	Mount Lemmon Survey	·	1.2 km	MPC · JPL
730873	2012 UO_{20}	—	September 11, 2002	Palomar	NEAT	·	2.7 km	MPC · JPL
730874	2012 UC_{25}	—	May 4, 2010	WISE	WISE	·	2.6 km	MPC · JPL
730875	2012 UG_{25}	—	November 3, 2008	Mount Lemmon	Mount Lemmon Survey	·	1.6 km	MPC · JPL
730876	2012 UU_{25}	—	February 17, 2010	Kitt Peak	Spacewatch	·	2.0 km	MPC · JPL
730877	2012 UE_{26}	—	September 21, 2012	Mount Lemmon	Mount Lemmon Survey	EOS	1.6 km	MPC · JPL
730878	2012 UF_{37}	—	October 16, 2012	Mount Lemmon	Mount Lemmon Survey	MAR	810 m	MPC · JPL
730879	2012 UZ_{39}	—	October 8, 2012	Mount Lemmon	Mount Lemmon Survey	MAR	810 m	MPC · JPL
730880	2012 UV_{42}	—	March 30, 2003	Kitt Peak	Deep Ecliptic Survey	·	1.0 km	MPC · JPL
730881	2012 UA_{45}	—	October 8, 2002	Kitt Peak	Spacewatch	KOR	1.3 km	MPC · JPL
730882	2012 UD_{49}	—	September 3, 2008	Kitt Peak	Spacewatch	MAS	810 m	MPC · JPL
730883	2012 UZ_{49}	—	June 15, 2010	WISE	WISE	HOF	2.7 km	MPC · JPL
730884	2012 US_{50}	—	March 3, 2000	Apache Point	SDSS Collaboration	NYS	1.0 km	MPC · JPL
730885	2012 UO_{53}	—	September 20, 2001	Apache Point	SDSS Collaboration	EOS	2.0 km	MPC · JPL
730886	2012 UJ_{54}	—	December 15, 2009	Mount Lemmon	Mount Lemmon Survey	·	640 m	MPC · JPL
730887	2012 UC_{75}	—	September 15, 2007	Mount Lemmon	Mount Lemmon Survey	·	1.9 km	MPC · JPL
730888	2012 UD_{77}	—	August 7, 2004	Palomar	NEAT	PHO	3.4 km	MPC · JPL
730889	2012 UJ_{77}	—	October 19, 2012	Mount Lemmon	Mount Lemmon Survey	·	1.1 km	MPC · JPL
730890	2012 UM_{80}	—	September 18, 2006	Kitt Peak	Spacewatch	·	2.8 km	MPC · JPL
730891 Patrickdowler	2012 UC_{88}	Patrickdowler	March 3, 2001	La Palma	D. D. Balam	·	1.4 km	MPC · JPL
730892	2012 UJ_{98}	—	October 10, 2012	Mount Lemmon	Mount Lemmon Survey	·	2.0 km	MPC · JPL
730893	2012 UQ_{102}	—	October 15, 2001	Apache Point	SDSS Collaboration	·	2.2 km	MPC · JPL
730894	2012 UH_{107}	—	October 11, 2012	Kitt Peak	Spacewatch	KON	1.7 km	MPC · JPL
730895	2012 UZ_{108}	—	October 19, 2012	Haleakala	Pan-STARRS 1	·	890 m	MPC · JPL
730896	2012 UN_{109}	—	September 17, 2003	Kitt Peak	Spacewatch	·	1.3 km	MPC · JPL
730897	2012 UY_{110}	—	October 15, 2012	Kitt Peak	Spacewatch	·	530 m	MPC · JPL
730898	2012 UG_{111}	—	October 15, 2012	Kitt Peak	Spacewatch	·	2.4 km	MPC · JPL
730899	2012 UC_{121}	—	October 22, 2012	Haleakala	Pan-STARRS 1	·	980 m	MPC · JPL
730900	2012 UZ_{125}	—	January 11, 1997	Kitt Peak	Spacewatch	·	700 m	MPC · JPL

== 730901–731000 ==
back to top

Designation			Discovery			Properties		Ref
Permanent	Provisional	Named after	Date	Site	Discoverer(s)	Category	Diam.	Ref
730901	2012 UN_{127}	—	June 24, 2010	WISE	WISE	·	1.7 km	MPC · JPL
730902	2012 UP_{131}	—	September 16, 2003	Palomar	NEAT	·	2.4 km	MPC · JPL
730903	2012 UL_{133}	—	February 7, 2003	Palomar	NEAT	·	3.4 km	MPC · JPL
730904	2012 UB_{136}	—	January 18, 2005	Catalina	CSS	·	1.2 km	MPC · JPL
730905	2012 UC_{137}	—	October 15, 2012	Mount Lemmon SkyCe	T. Vorobjov, Kostin, A.	·	1.5 km	MPC · JPL
730906	2012 UF_{144}	—	September 17, 2006	Kitt Peak	Spacewatch	EOS	1.5 km	MPC · JPL
730907	2012 UH_{153}	—	October 21, 2012	Haleakala	Pan-STARRS 1	(5)	1.0 km	MPC · JPL
730908	2012 UQ_{156}	—	October 11, 2012	Haleakala	Pan-STARRS 1	·	1.2 km	MPC · JPL
730909	2012 UY_{158}	—	September 26, 2012	Nogales	M. Schwartz, P. R. Holvorcem	EUN	1.2 km	MPC · JPL
730910	2012 UQ_{164}	—	July 25, 2010	WISE	WISE	·	3.1 km	MPC · JPL
730911	2012 UY_{164}	—	February 28, 2003	Haleakala	NEAT	·	3.9 km	MPC · JPL
730912	2012 UB_{167}	—	August 22, 2003	Campo Imperatore	CINEOS	·	3.5 km	MPC · JPL
730913	2012 UC_{167}	—	July 21, 2006	Lulin	LUSS	·	5.0 km	MPC · JPL
730914	2012 UK_{167}	—	August 29, 1995	La Silla	C.-I. Lagerkvist	HYG	4.0 km	MPC · JPL
730915	2012 UG_{180}	—	October 22, 2012	Haleakala	Pan-STARRS 1	·	940 m	MPC · JPL
730916	2012 US_{180}	—	September 18, 2003	Kitt Peak	Spacewatch	·	1.3 km	MPC · JPL
730917	2012 UD_{184}	—	October 27, 2012	Mount Lemmon	Mount Lemmon Survey	·	1.3 km	MPC · JPL
730918	2012 UV_{199}	—	May 3, 2008	Mount Lemmon	Mount Lemmon Survey	L5	9.3 km	MPC · JPL
730919	2012 UT_{202}	—	October 18, 2012	Haleakala	Pan-STARRS 1	·	2.0 km	MPC · JPL
730920	2012 UV_{210}	—	October 18, 2012	Haleakala	Pan-STARRS 1	·	820 m	MPC · JPL
730921	2012 UO_{225}	—	October 19, 2012	Mount Lemmon	Mount Lemmon Survey	·	2.5 km	MPC · JPL
730922	2012 UP_{225}	—	October 21, 2012	Mount Lemmon	Mount Lemmon Survey	L5	7.1 km	MPC · JPL
730923	2012 UV_{235}	—	October 23, 2012	Mount Lemmon	Mount Lemmon Survey	GEF	990 m	MPC · JPL
730924	2012 UL_{237}	—	October 6, 2008	Kitt Peak	Spacewatch	·	820 m	MPC · JPL
730925	2012 UP_{257}	—	October 16, 2012	La Silla	La Silla	L5	6.3 km	MPC · JPL
730926	2012 VN_{1}	—	January 27, 2010	WISE	WISE	ADE	1.7 km	MPC · JPL
730927	2012 VH_{2}	—	March 10, 2007	Kitt Peak	Spacewatch	L5	10 km	MPC · JPL
730928	2012 VJ_{2}	—	October 6, 2012	Haleakala	Pan-STARRS 1	·	1.2 km	MPC · JPL
730929	2012 VJ_{9}	—	October 22, 2012	Siding Spring	SSS	·	600 m	MPC · JPL
730930	2012 VQ_{13}	—	August 25, 2004	Kitt Peak	Spacewatch	·	990 m	MPC · JPL
730931	2012 VS_{13}	—	March 23, 2003	Apache Point	SDSS Collaboration	·	3.0 km	MPC · JPL
730932	2012 VC_{14}	—	October 18, 2012	Haleakala	Pan-STARRS 1	·	840 m	MPC · JPL
730933	2012 VE_{14}	—	October 18, 2012	Haleakala	Pan-STARRS 1	·	890 m	MPC · JPL
730934	2012 VX_{14}	—	November 4, 2012	Haleakala	Pan-STARRS 1	·	1.9 km	MPC · JPL
730935	2012 VA_{15}	—	November 4, 2012	Haleakala	Pan-STARRS 1	·	820 m	MPC · JPL
730936	2012 VZ_{16}	—	August 25, 2003	Palomar	NEAT	·	2.1 km	MPC · JPL
730937	2012 VP_{19}	—	December 16, 2004	Kitt Peak	Spacewatch	·	1.0 km	MPC · JPL
730938	2012 VW_{22}	—	September 26, 2006	Mount Lemmon	Mount Lemmon Survey	·	2.1 km	MPC · JPL
730939	2012 VW_{29}	—	July 12, 2010	WISE	WISE	TRE	2.0 km	MPC · JPL
730940	2012 VL_{42}	—	December 10, 2001	Apache Point	SDSS	·	960 m	MPC · JPL
730941	2012 VU_{44}	—	February 7, 2002	Kitt Peak	Deep Ecliptic Survey	·	1.6 km	MPC · JPL
730942	2012 VR_{46}	—	November 6, 2012	Mount Lemmon	Mount Lemmon Survey	·	2.4 km	MPC · JPL
730943	2012 VA_{50}	—	March 24, 2003	Kitt Peak	Spacewatch	·	1.3 km	MPC · JPL
730944	2012 VY_{56}	—	October 20, 2012	Haleakala	Pan-STARRS 1	·	1.9 km	MPC · JPL
730945	2012 VZ_{57}	—	October 3, 2003	Kitt Peak	Spacewatch	·	1.4 km	MPC · JPL
730946	2012 VR_{58}	—	November 17, 2008	Kitt Peak	Spacewatch	·	780 m	MPC · JPL
730947	2012 VB_{65}	—	October 5, 2002	Apache Point	SDSS Collaboration	·	1.6 km	MPC · JPL
730948	2012 VN_{67}	—	October 23, 2012	Bergisch Gladbach	W. Bickel	·	1.9 km	MPC · JPL
730949	2012 VU_{67}	—	November 7, 2012	Mount Lemmon	Mount Lemmon Survey	VER	2.3 km	MPC · JPL
730950	2012 VZ_{68}	—	October 27, 2008	Mount Lemmon	Mount Lemmon Survey	·	860 m	MPC · JPL
730951	2012 VU_{80}	—	January 21, 1996	Kitt Peak	Spacewatch	·	1.3 km	MPC · JPL
730952	2012 VD_{83}	—	July 4, 2010	WISE	WISE	·	2.6 km	MPC · JPL
730953	2012 VV_{86}	—	September 13, 2002	Socorro	LINEAR	slow	800 m	MPC · JPL
730954	2012 VM_{87}	—	November 6, 2012	Kitt Peak	Spacewatch	·	1.4 km	MPC · JPL
730955	2012 VW_{89}	—	April 19, 2004	Kitt Peak	Spacewatch	THM	3.5 km	MPC · JPL
730956	2012 VX_{92}	—	September 25, 2003	Palomar	NEAT	·	1.7 km	MPC · JPL
730957	2012 VV_{98}	—	October 27, 1998	Kitt Peak	Spacewatch	DOR	2.2 km	MPC · JPL
730958	2012 VB_{99}	—	October 25, 2001	Apache Point	SDSS Collaboration	EOS	2.4 km	MPC · JPL
730959	2012 VV_{103}	—	December 19, 2004	Mount Lemmon	Mount Lemmon Survey	·	1.0 km	MPC · JPL
730960	2012 VU_{108}	—	February 26, 2003	Campo Imperatore	CINEOS	·	3.3 km	MPC · JPL
730961	2012 VZ_{109}	—	November 4, 2012	Mount Lemmon	Mount Lemmon Survey	·	1.1 km	MPC · JPL
730962	2012 VQ_{116}	—	December 29, 2000	Kitt Peak	Spacewatch	(5)	970 m	MPC · JPL
730963	2012 VA_{122}	—	December 13, 2017	Mount Lemmon	Mount Lemmon Survey	·	1.4 km	MPC · JPL
730964	2012 VR_{127}	—	November 14, 2012	Mount Lemmon	Mount Lemmon Survey	VER	2.1 km	MPC · JPL
730965	2012 VZ_{128}	—	November 7, 2012	Mount Lemmon	Mount Lemmon Survey	·	780 m	MPC · JPL
730966	2012 VC_{129}	—	November 12, 2012	Mount Lemmon	Mount Lemmon Survey	·	1.1 km	MPC · JPL
730967	2012 VG_{129}	—	May 3, 2002	Kitt Peak	Spacewatch	·	1.5 km	MPC · JPL
730968	2012 VW_{129}	—	November 6, 2012	Mount Lemmon	Mount Lemmon Survey	·	1.1 km	MPC · JPL
730969	2012 WA_{3}	—	November 13, 2002	Palomar	NEAT	·	780 m	MPC · JPL
730970	2012 WZ_{4}	—	October 22, 2012	Haleakala	Pan-STARRS 1	EUN	920 m	MPC · JPL
730971	2012 WN_{13}	—	November 19, 2012	Kitt Peak	Spacewatch	·	1.2 km	MPC · JPL
730972	2012 WQ_{13}	—	October 20, 2003	Kitt Peak	Spacewatch	·	1.5 km	MPC · JPL
730973	2012 WD_{17}	—	October 17, 2012	Siding Spring	SSS	·	1.9 km	MPC · JPL
730974	2012 WA_{22}	—	October 10, 2004	Kitt Peak	Spacewatch	T_{j} (2.97) · 3:2	3.4 km	MPC · JPL
730975	2012 WE_{23}	—	October 23, 2012	Mount Lemmon	Mount Lemmon Survey	·	1.3 km	MPC · JPL
730976	2012 WU_{29}	—	October 14, 2001	Apache Point	SDSS Collaboration	·	1.8 km	MPC · JPL
730977	2012 WU_{30}	—	April 18, 2010	WISE	WISE	·	1.2 km	MPC · JPL
730978	2012 WX_{30}	—	November 7, 2012	Haleakala	Pan-STARRS 1	·	1.6 km	MPC · JPL
730979	2012 WB_{31}	—	October 7, 2004	Kitt Peak	Spacewatch	·	1.4 km	MPC · JPL
730980	2012 WB_{34}	—	October 2, 1995	Kitt Peak	Spacewatch	·	1.1 km	MPC · JPL
730981	2012 WZ_{39}	—	April 28, 2010	WISE	WISE	L5	9.2 km	MPC · JPL
730982	2012 WE_{41}	—	November 24, 2012	Kitt Peak	Spacewatch	·	830 m	MPC · JPL
730983	2012 XB_{1}	—	December 18, 2007	Kitt Peak	Spacewatch	·	1.8 km	MPC · JPL
730984	2012 XQ_{7}	—	December 20, 2004	Mount Lemmon	Mount Lemmon Survey	·	1.6 km	MPC · JPL
730985	2012 XK_{8}	—	November 14, 2012	Kitt Peak	Spacewatch	·	1.2 km	MPC · JPL
730986	2012 XM_{8}	—	October 10, 2002	Apache Point	SDSS Collaboration	·	1.8 km	MPC · JPL
730987	2012 XD_{11}	—	April 20, 1993	Kitt Peak	Spacewatch	·	1.9 km	MPC · JPL
730988	2012 XP_{14}	—	December 5, 2012	Mount Lemmon	Mount Lemmon Survey	·	680 m	MPC · JPL
730989	2012 XQ_{14}	—	December 22, 2008	Mount Lemmon	Mount Lemmon Survey	·	1.8 km	MPC · JPL
730990	2012 XK_{23}	—	May 25, 2006	Mauna Kea	P. A. Wiegert	·	1.3 km	MPC · JPL
730991	2012 XB_{24}	—	December 29, 2008	Kitt Peak	Spacewatch	MIS	1.9 km	MPC · JPL
730992	2012 XN_{26}	—	October 9, 2007	Mount Lemmon	Mount Lemmon Survey	·	1.4 km	MPC · JPL
730993	2012 XO_{26}	—	June 7, 2010	WISE	WISE	·	1.6 km	MPC · JPL
730994	2012 XH_{28}	—	December 3, 2012	Mount Lemmon	Mount Lemmon Survey	VER	2.6 km	MPC · JPL
730995	2012 XD_{29}	—	November 15, 1995	Kitt Peak	Spacewatch	·	1.1 km	MPC · JPL
730996	2012 XO_{29}	—	November 4, 2012	Kitt Peak	Spacewatch	·	1.5 km	MPC · JPL
730997	2012 XK_{31}	—	September 11, 2001	Kitt Peak	Spacewatch	·	1.9 km	MPC · JPL
730998	2012 XJ_{36}	—	December 17, 2007	Mount Lemmon	Mount Lemmon Survey	LIX	4.2 km	MPC · JPL
730999	2012 XX_{39}	—	February 8, 2010	WISE	WISE	·	1.5 km	MPC · JPL
731000	2012 XF_{48}	—	February 14, 2004	Wrightwood	J. W. Young	·	3.2 km	MPC · JPL

back to top

== Meaning of names ==
As minor planet discoveries are confirmed, they are given a permanent number by the IAU's Minor Planet Center (MPC), and the discoverers can then submit names for them, following the IAU's naming conventions. The list below concerns those minor planets in the specified number-range that have received names, and explains the meanings of those names.

Official naming citations of newly named small Solar System bodies are approved and published in a bulletin by IAU's Working Group for Small Bodies Nomenclature (WGSBN). Before May 2021, citations were published in MPC's Minor Planet Circulars for many decades. Recent citations can also be found on the JPL Small-Body Database (SBDB). Until his death in 2016, German astronomer Lutz D. Schmadel compiled these citations into the Dictionary of Minor Planet Names (DMP) and regularly updated the collection.

Based on Paul Herget's The Names of the Minor Planets, Schmadel also researched the unclear origin of numerous asteroids, most of which had been named prior to World War II. This article incorporates text from this source, which is in the public domain: SBDB New namings may only be added to this list below after official publication as the preannouncement of names is condemned. The WGSBN publishes a comprehensive guideline for the naming rules of non-cometary small Solar System bodies.

Named minor planet	Provisional	This minor planet was named for...	Ref · Catalog
730495 Costafrancini	2012 HH_{58}	Claudio Costa, Italian amateur astronomer and technical expert at the Vatican Observatory.	IAU · 730495
730891 Patrickdowler	2012 UC_{88}	Patrick Dowler, Canadian astronomer	IAU · 730891
