= List of minor planets: 599001–600000 =

The following is a partial list of minor planets, running from minor-planet number 599001 through 600000, inclusive. The primary data for this and other partial lists is based on JPL's "Small-Body Orbital Elements" and data available from the Minor Planet Center. Critical list information is also provided by the MPC, unless otherwise specified from Lowell Observatory. A detailed description of the table's columns and additional sources are given on the main page including a complete list of every page in this series, and a statistical break-up on the dynamical classification of minor planets.

Also see the summary list of all named bodies in numerical and alphabetical order, and the corresponding naming citations for the number range of this particular list. New namings may only be added to this list after official publication, as the preannouncement of names is condemned by the Working Group for Small Bodies Nomenclature of the International Astronomical Union.

Near-Earth obj.	MBA (inner)	MBA (outer)	Centaur
Mars-crosser	MBA (middle)	Jupiter trojan	Trans-Neptunian obj.
Unclassified

== 599001–599100 ==
Designation			Discovery			Properties		Ref
Permanent	Provisional	Named after	Date	Site	Discoverer(s)	Category	Diam.	Ref
599001	2009 OF_{29}	—	July 30, 2009	Charleston	R. Holmes	·	730 m	MPC · JPL
599002	2009 PK	—	August 10, 2009	Cerro Burek	Burek, Cerro	·	1.4 km	MPC · JPL
599003	2009 PJ_{4}	—	June 23, 2009	Mount Lemmon	Mount Lemmon Survey	·	2.8 km	MPC · JPL
599004	2009 PT_{9}	—	August 14, 2009	La Sagra	OAM	·	1.7 km	MPC · JPL
599005	2009 PW_{18}	—	August 15, 2009	Catalina	CSS	VER	3.3 km	MPC · JPL
599006	2009 PX_{21}	—	August 15, 2009	Kitt Peak	Spacewatch	·	2.7 km	MPC · JPL
599007	2009 PG_{22}	—	August 15, 2009	Kitt Peak	Spacewatch	3:2	4.2 km	MPC · JPL
599008	2009 PJ_{22}	—	February 26, 2012	Mount Lemmon	Mount Lemmon Survey	PHO	960 m	MPC · JPL
599009	2009 PX_{22}	—	September 8, 2015	XuYi	PMO NEO Survey Program	(31811)	2.8 km	MPC · JPL
599010	2009 QU_{1}	—	August 17, 2009	Tzec Maun	E. Schwab	·	960 m	MPC · JPL
599011	2009 QU_{3}	—	August 16, 2009	Catalina	CSS	·	1.7 km	MPC · JPL
599012	2009 QK_{6}	—	August 16, 2009	La Sagra	OAM	THB	2.5 km	MPC · JPL
599013	2009 QN_{7}	—	August 17, 2009	Bergisch Gladbach	W. Bickel	·	3.1 km	MPC · JPL
599014	2009 QW_{8}	—	July 27, 2005	Palomar	NEAT	·	1.4 km	MPC · JPL
599015	2009 QP_{21}	—	August 19, 2009	La Sagra	OAM	·	2.8 km	MPC · JPL
599016	2009 QE_{22}	—	August 20, 2009	La Sagra	OAM	·	3.7 km	MPC · JPL
599017	2009 QJ_{27}	—	August 23, 2009	Taunus	R. Kling, Zimmer, U.	(1547)	1.7 km	MPC · JPL
599018	2009 QD_{35}	—	August 13, 2002	Palomar	NEAT	·	740 m	MPC · JPL
599019 Jerzymadej	2009 QY_{36}	Jerzymadej	August 29, 2009	Zelenchukskaya Station	T. V. Krjačko, B. Satovski	·	1.8 km	MPC · JPL
599020	2009 QC_{50}	—	August 28, 2009	Kitt Peak	Spacewatch	·	1.6 km	MPC · JPL
599021	2009 QQ_{54}	—	August 27, 2009	Kitt Peak	Spacewatch	THM	2.1 km	MPC · JPL
599022	2009 QB_{57}	—	August 17, 2009	Kitt Peak	Spacewatch	·	2.4 km	MPC · JPL
599023	2009 QU_{62}	—	December 1, 2005	Palomar	NEAT	·	1.9 km	MPC · JPL
599024	2009 QV_{62}	—	August 27, 2009	Kitt Peak	Spacewatch	·	2.6 km	MPC · JPL
599025	2009 QU_{63}	—	August 16, 2009	Catalina	CSS	·	2.8 km	MPC · JPL
599026	2009 QB_{66}	—	August 16, 2009	Kitt Peak	Spacewatch	·	860 m	MPC · JPL
599027	2009 QN_{66}	—	March 14, 2005	Mount Lemmon	Mount Lemmon Survey	·	570 m	MPC · JPL
599028	2009 QV_{66}	—	August 27, 2009	Kitt Peak	Spacewatch	·	3.1 km	MPC · JPL
599029	2009 QF_{67}	—	August 17, 2009	Kitt Peak	Spacewatch	·	2.7 km	MPC · JPL
599030	2009 QM_{67}	—	February 28, 2012	Haleakala	Pan-STARRS 1	·	1.0 km	MPC · JPL
599031	2009 QB_{68}	—	August 19, 2009	Catalina	CSS	EUP	4.1 km	MPC · JPL
599032	2009 QW_{68}	—	February 3, 2012	Haleakala	Pan-STARRS 1	EUP	3.4 km	MPC · JPL
599033	2009 QF_{69}	—	August 18, 2009	Kitt Peak	Spacewatch	·	2.4 km	MPC · JPL
599034	2009 QT_{70}	—	February 23, 2018	Mount Lemmon	Mount Lemmon Survey	·	2.2 km	MPC · JPL
599035	2009 QJ_{71}	—	August 18, 2009	Kitt Peak	Spacewatch	·	2.6 km	MPC · JPL
599036	2009 QW_{71}	—	August 16, 2009	Kitt Peak	Spacewatch	·	740 m	MPC · JPL
599037	2009 QN_{72}	—	August 28, 2009	Kitt Peak	Spacewatch	MAS	630 m	MPC · JPL
599038	2009 QO_{72}	—	August 20, 2009	Kitt Peak	Spacewatch	·	850 m	MPC · JPL
599039	2009 QA_{73}	—	August 16, 2009	Kitt Peak	Spacewatch	·	2.6 km	MPC · JPL
599040	2009 QQ_{73}	—	August 17, 2009	Kitt Peak	Spacewatch	·	3.0 km	MPC · JPL
599041	2009 QE_{76}	—	August 27, 2009	Kitt Peak	Spacewatch	·	1.2 km	MPC · JPL
599042	2009 QY_{76}	—	August 29, 2009	Kitt Peak	Spacewatch	·	720 m	MPC · JPL
599043	2009 RM_{18}	—	September 7, 2008	Mount Lemmon	Mount Lemmon Survey	L4	6.1 km	MPC · JPL
599044	2009 RE_{20}	—	September 14, 2009	Catalina	CSS	·	4.4 km	MPC · JPL
599045	2009 RY_{22}	—	September 15, 2009	Mount Lemmon	Mount Lemmon Survey	URS	2.7 km	MPC · JPL
599046	2009 RL_{23}	—	May 20, 2005	Mount Lemmon	Mount Lemmon Survey	·	840 m	MPC · JPL
599047	2009 RC_{33}	—	September 14, 2009	Kitt Peak	Spacewatch	L4	7.8 km	MPC · JPL
599048	2009 RA_{36}	—	July 29, 2009	Kitt Peak	Spacewatch	·	570 m	MPC · JPL
599049	2009 RU_{37}	—	September 15, 2009	Kitt Peak	Spacewatch	·	1.7 km	MPC · JPL
599050	2009 RZ_{38}	—	September 15, 2009	Kitt Peak	Spacewatch	TIR	3.2 km	MPC · JPL
599051	2009 RL_{41}	—	November 6, 2005	Mount Lemmon	Mount Lemmon Survey	·	1.7 km	MPC · JPL
599052	2009 RN_{41}	—	September 15, 2009	Kitt Peak	Spacewatch	·	2.2 km	MPC · JPL
599053	2009 RQ_{43}	—	September 15, 2009	Kitt Peak	Spacewatch	L4	7.0 km	MPC · JPL
599054	2009 RN_{62}	—	September 15, 2009	Kitt Peak	Spacewatch	L4	6.7 km	MPC · JPL
599055	2009 RN_{64}	—	February 13, 2002	Apache Point	SDSS Collaboration	L4	6.7 km	MPC · JPL
599056	2009 RB_{66}	—	July 30, 2009	Kitt Peak	Spacewatch	·	2.1 km	MPC · JPL
599057	2009 RL_{77}	—	April 17, 2012	Kitt Peak	Spacewatch	·	790 m	MPC · JPL
599058	2009 RQ_{77}	—	January 14, 2012	Kitt Peak	Spacewatch	URS	2.8 km	MPC · JPL
599059	2009 RE_{79}	—	September 15, 2009	Kitt Peak	Spacewatch	·	2.5 km	MPC · JPL
599060	2009 RU_{79}	—	September 15, 2009	Kitt Peak	Spacewatch	L4	6.8 km	MPC · JPL
599061	2009 RY_{80}	—	September 15, 2009	Kitt Peak	Spacewatch	L4	6.2 km	MPC · JPL
599062	2009 RA_{81}	—	September 15, 2009	Kitt Peak	Spacewatch	·	1.4 km	MPC · JPL
599063	2009 RF_{81}	—	September 15, 2009	Kitt Peak	Spacewatch	·	2.2 km	MPC · JPL
599064	2009 RG_{81}	—	September 12, 2009	Kitt Peak	Spacewatch	EUP	2.6 km	MPC · JPL
599065	2009 RA_{82}	—	September 15, 2009	Kitt Peak	Spacewatch	·	2.1 km	MPC · JPL
599066	2009 SL_{8}	—	September 16, 2009	Mount Lemmon	Mount Lemmon Survey	·	3.1 km	MPC · JPL
599067	2009 SC_{9}	—	September 16, 2009	Mount Lemmon	Mount Lemmon Survey	·	2.7 km	MPC · JPL
599068	2009 SD_{10}	—	September 16, 2009	Mount Lemmon	Mount Lemmon Survey	·	3.4 km	MPC · JPL
599069	2009 SR_{29}	—	September 16, 2009	Kitt Peak	Spacewatch	L4	6.7 km	MPC · JPL
599070	2009 SK_{36}	—	March 24, 2001	Kitt Peak	Spacewatch	·	2.7 km	MPC · JPL
599071	2009 SU_{47}	—	September 16, 2009	Kitt Peak	Spacewatch	·	2.6 km	MPC · JPL
599072	2009 SL_{48}	—	November 27, 1998	Kitt Peak	Spacewatch	L4 · ERY	6.7 km	MPC · JPL
599073	2009 SO_{49}	—	September 17, 2009	Kitt Peak	Spacewatch	V	490 m	MPC · JPL
599074	2009 SZ_{51}	—	September 17, 2009	Mount Lemmon	Mount Lemmon Survey	·	2.7 km	MPC · JPL
599075	2009 SH_{59}	—	September 17, 2009	Mount Lemmon	Mount Lemmon Survey	EUN	770 m	MPC · JPL
599076	2009 SK_{72}	—	August 29, 2009	Kitt Peak	Spacewatch	·	1.6 km	MPC · JPL
599077	2009 SO_{81}	—	September 18, 2009	Mount Lemmon	Mount Lemmon Survey	·	1.3 km	MPC · JPL
599078	2009 SF_{82}	—	August 15, 2009	Kitt Peak	Spacewatch	·	1.5 km	MPC · JPL
599079	2009 SF_{85}	—	September 18, 2009	Mount Lemmon	Mount Lemmon Survey	·	2.5 km	MPC · JPL
599080	2009 ST_{89}	—	September 18, 2009	Mount Lemmon	Mount Lemmon Survey	·	1.9 km	MPC · JPL
599081	2009 SE_{93}	—	April 20, 2004	Kitt Peak	Spacewatch	·	1.2 km	MPC · JPL
599082	2009 SV_{93}	—	August 29, 2009	Kitt Peak	Spacewatch	·	2.4 km	MPC · JPL
599083 Snezhko	2009 SJ_{101}	Snezhko	September 24, 2009	Zelenchukskaya Station	T. V. Krjačko, B. Satovski	H	450 m	MPC · JPL
599084	2009 SM_{101}	—	September 23, 2009	Zelenchukskaya Station	T. V. Krjačko, B. Satovski	JUN	1.3 km	MPC · JPL
599085	2009 SG_{105}	—	September 16, 2009	Kitt Peak	Spacewatch	·	2.2 km	MPC · JPL
599086	2009 SS_{105}	—	September 16, 2009	Mount Lemmon	Mount Lemmon Survey	EOS	1.6 km	MPC · JPL
599087	2009 ST_{108}	—	September 17, 2009	Kitt Peak	Spacewatch	·	3.0 km	MPC · JPL
599088	2009 SK_{109}	—	September 17, 2009	Mount Lemmon	Mount Lemmon Survey	·	1.2 km	MPC · JPL
599089	2009 SP_{133}	—	September 18, 2009	Kitt Peak	Spacewatch	·	590 m	MPC · JPL
599090	2009 SS_{145}	—	October 29, 2005	Catalina	CSS	ADE	1.7 km	MPC · JPL
599091	2009 SP_{149}	—	September 26, 2003	Apache Point	SDSS	·	3.2 km	MPC · JPL
599092	2009 SC_{151}	—	September 20, 2009	Kitt Peak	Spacewatch	·	1.2 km	MPC · JPL
599093	2009 SM_{154}	—	September 20, 2009	Kitt Peak	Spacewatch	3:2 · SHU	4.6 km	MPC · JPL
599094	2009 SF_{158}	—	February 16, 2007	Mount Lemmon	Mount Lemmon Survey	SUL	1.6 km	MPC · JPL
599095	2009 SC_{164}	—	August 27, 2005	Kitt Peak	Spacewatch	·	1.1 km	MPC · JPL
599096	2009 SU_{169}	—	December 25, 2005	Kitt Peak	Spacewatch	·	2.8 km	MPC · JPL
599097	2009 SV_{172}	—	September 18, 2009	Kitt Peak	Spacewatch	L4	6.5 km	MPC · JPL
599098	2009 ST_{173}	—	September 18, 2009	Catalina	CSS	THB	2.4 km	MPC · JPL
599099	2009 SL_{174}	—	September 18, 2009	Mount Lemmon	Mount Lemmon Survey	·	2.3 km	MPC · JPL
599100	2009 ST_{174}	—	September 19, 1998	Apache Point	SDSS Collaboration	EUP	2.2 km	MPC · JPL

== 599101–599200 ==
back to top

Designation			Discovery			Properties		Ref
Permanent	Provisional	Named after	Date	Site	Discoverer(s)	Category	Diam.	Ref
599101	2009 SD_{176}	—	September 19, 2009	Mount Lemmon	Mount Lemmon Survey	·	3.1 km	MPC · JPL
599102	2009 SX_{176}	—	September 20, 2009	Kitt Peak	Spacewatch	·	2.5 km	MPC · JPL
599103	2009 SE_{177}	—	September 20, 2009	Kitt Peak	Spacewatch	·	1.4 km	MPC · JPL
599104	2009 SZ_{181}	—	September 17, 2003	Kitt Peak	Spacewatch	·	2.7 km	MPC · JPL
599105	2009 SF_{186}	—	September 17, 2009	Kitt Peak	Spacewatch	L4	7.5 km	MPC · JPL
599106	2009 SM_{186}	—	September 21, 2009	Kitt Peak	Spacewatch	·	2.6 km	MPC · JPL
599107	2009 SR_{188}	—	September 21, 2009	Kitt Peak	Spacewatch	LIX	2.6 km	MPC · JPL
599108	2009 SZ_{189}	—	September 22, 2009	Kitt Peak	Spacewatch	·	2.0 km	MPC · JPL
599109	2009 SX_{190}	—	September 22, 2009	Kitt Peak	Spacewatch	V	630 m	MPC · JPL
599110	2009 ST_{200}	—	September 22, 2009	Catalina	CSS	THB	2.4 km	MPC · JPL
599111	2009 SM_{202}	—	September 22, 2009	Kitt Peak	Spacewatch	L4	7.3 km	MPC · JPL
599112	2009 SJ_{207}	—	September 23, 2009	Kitt Peak	Spacewatch	·	3.3 km	MPC · JPL
599113	2009 ST_{207}	—	September 23, 2009	Kitt Peak	Spacewatch	L4	7.2 km	MPC · JPL
599114	2009 SC_{210}	—	March 29, 2004	Kitt Peak	Spacewatch	·	1.1 km	MPC · JPL
599115	2009 SS_{212}	—	September 23, 2009	Kitt Peak	Spacewatch	·	1.6 km	MPC · JPL
599116	2009 SC_{217}	—	September 15, 2009	Kitt Peak	Spacewatch	·	3.0 km	MPC · JPL
599117	2009 SR_{218}	—	September 24, 2009	Mount Lemmon	Mount Lemmon Survey	·	2.7 km	MPC · JPL
599118	2009 SA_{219}	—	September 24, 2009	Kitt Peak	Spacewatch	·	2.4 km	MPC · JPL
599119	2009 SG_{223}	—	September 25, 2009	Mount Lemmon	Mount Lemmon Survey	·	2.1 km	MPC · JPL
599120	2009 SJ_{224}	—	September 25, 2009	Mount Lemmon	Mount Lemmon Survey	VER	1.9 km	MPC · JPL
599121	2009 SU_{227}	—	September 26, 2009	Kitt Peak	Spacewatch	L4	5.5 km	MPC · JPL
599122	2009 SL_{233}	—	September 20, 2009	Mount Lemmon	Mount Lemmon Survey	PHO	790 m	MPC · JPL
599123	2009 SM_{242}	—	September 22, 2009	Catalina	CSS	EUN	1.0 km	MPC · JPL
599124	2009 SH_{244}	—	September 17, 2009	Kitt Peak	Spacewatch	·	2.1 km	MPC · JPL
599125	2009 SH_{246}	—	September 17, 2009	Kitt Peak	Spacewatch	L4	7.0 km	MPC · JPL
599126	2009 SR_{246}	—	September 17, 2009	Kitt Peak	Spacewatch	L4	5.9 km	MPC · JPL
599127	2009 SM_{254}	—	September 18, 2009	Kitt Peak	Spacewatch	L4	6.8 km	MPC · JPL
599128	2009 SC_{255}	—	September 16, 2009	Siding Spring	SSS	·	1.4 km	MPC · JPL
599129	2009 SX_{260}	—	August 28, 2009	Kitt Peak	Spacewatch	MAS	560 m	MPC · JPL
599130	2009 SW_{271}	—	September 16, 2009	Kitt Peak	Spacewatch	·	1.5 km	MPC · JPL
599131	2009 SX_{272}	—	September 25, 2009	Kitt Peak	Spacewatch	·	2.2 km	MPC · JPL
599132	2009 SF_{277}	—	March 31, 2008	Kitt Peak	Spacewatch	·	2.0 km	MPC · JPL
599133	2009 SE_{279}	—	September 25, 2009	Kitt Peak	Spacewatch	L4	7.6 km	MPC · JPL
599134	2009 SH_{279}	—	September 25, 2009	Kitt Peak	Spacewatch	·	1.2 km	MPC · JPL
599135	2009 SC_{283}	—	September 25, 2009	Kitt Peak	Spacewatch	HYG	2.1 km	MPC · JPL
599136	2009 SH_{284}	—	September 29, 2001	Palomar	NEAT	H	510 m	MPC · JPL
599137	2009 SV_{288}	—	October 4, 1999	Kitt Peak	Spacewatch	·	540 m	MPC · JPL
599138	2009 SA_{292}	—	May 14, 2005	Mount Lemmon	Mount Lemmon Survey	·	630 m	MPC · JPL
599139	2009 SP_{292}	—	September 26, 2009	Kitt Peak	Spacewatch	EUN	870 m	MPC · JPL
599140	2009 SM_{300}	—	September 16, 2009	Kitt Peak	Spacewatch	·	2.0 km	MPC · JPL
599141	2009 SB_{303}	—	August 20, 2009	Kitt Peak	Spacewatch	V	500 m	MPC · JPL
599142	2009 SM_{303}	—	August 20, 2009	Kitt Peak	Spacewatch	V	510 m	MPC · JPL
599143	2009 SM_{308}	—	September 7, 2008	Mount Lemmon	Mount Lemmon Survey	L4	7.5 km	MPC · JPL
599144	2009 SF_{311}	—	September 18, 2009	Mount Lemmon	Mount Lemmon Survey	(3460)	1.7 km	MPC · JPL
599145	2009 SR_{315}	—	September 19, 2009	Mount Lemmon	Mount Lemmon Survey	·	2.6 km	MPC · JPL
599146	2009 SS_{316}	—	August 27, 2009	Kitt Peak	Spacewatch	EOS	1.5 km	MPC · JPL
599147	2009 SL_{319}	—	September 20, 2009	Kitt Peak	Spacewatch	·	2.7 km	MPC · JPL
599148	2009 SW_{323}	—	August 15, 2009	Kitt Peak	Spacewatch	·	2.6 km	MPC · JPL
599149	2009 SZ_{330}	—	September 28, 2006	Mount Lemmon	Mount Lemmon Survey	·	600 m	MPC · JPL
599150	2009 SD_{334}	—	September 23, 2009	Kitt Peak	Spacewatch	PHO	860 m	MPC · JPL
599151	2009 SS_{336}	—	September 19, 2003	Palomar	NEAT	T_{j} (2.97)	3.8 km	MPC · JPL
599152	2009 SD_{344}	—	September 17, 2009	Kitt Peak	Spacewatch	·	900 m	MPC · JPL
599153	2009 SJ_{345}	—	September 18, 2009	Kitt Peak	Spacewatch	EOS	1.3 km	MPC · JPL
599154	2009 SJ_{358}	—	September 16, 2009	Mount Lemmon	Mount Lemmon Survey	·	2.7 km	MPC · JPL
599155	2009 SV_{363}	—	April 19, 2007	Mount Lemmon	Mount Lemmon Survey	·	2.7 km	MPC · JPL
599156	2009 SW_{373}	—	August 31, 2017	Mount Lemmon	Mount Lemmon Survey	H	400 m	MPC · JPL
599157	2009 SQ_{374}	—	March 28, 2012	Mount Lemmon	Mount Lemmon Survey	·	800 m	MPC · JPL
599158	2009 ST_{375}	—	November 4, 2004	Kitt Peak	Spacewatch	·	2.4 km	MPC · JPL
599159	2009 SJ_{377}	—	January 24, 2011	Mount Lemmon	Mount Lemmon Survey	·	2.4 km	MPC · JPL
599160	2009 SK_{378}	—	November 20, 2015	Mount Lemmon	Mount Lemmon Survey	·	2.6 km	MPC · JPL
599161	2009 SS_{378}	—	September 27, 2009	Kitt Peak	Spacewatch	·	790 m	MPC · JPL
599162	2009 SM_{382}	—	June 30, 2014	Haleakala	Pan-STARRS 1	·	2.8 km	MPC · JPL
599163	2009 SR_{382}	—	September 26, 2009	Kitt Peak	Spacewatch	·	880 m	MPC · JPL
599164	2009 SD_{383}	—	May 9, 2013	Haleakala	Pan-STARRS 1	VER	2.2 km	MPC · JPL
599165	2009 SM_{384}	—	October 5, 2013	Haleakala	Pan-STARRS 1	·	1.2 km	MPC · JPL
599166	2009 SH_{385}	—	September 29, 2009	Mount Lemmon	Mount Lemmon Survey	L4	7.3 km	MPC · JPL
599167	2009 SF_{389}	—	July 30, 2008	Mount Lemmon	Mount Lemmon Survey	L4	5.3 km	MPC · JPL
599168	2009 SP_{389}	—	August 30, 2014	Mount Lemmon	Mount Lemmon Survey	·	1.6 km	MPC · JPL
599169	2009 SF_{390}	—	March 8, 2013	Haleakala	Pan-STARRS 1	·	2.2 km	MPC · JPL
599170	2009 SG_{391}	—	June 24, 2014	Haleakala	Pan-STARRS 1	·	2.3 km	MPC · JPL
599171	2009 SM_{391}	—	May 18, 2015	Haleakala	Pan-STARRS 1	·	520 m	MPC · JPL
599172	2009 SP_{391}	—	September 12, 2015	Haleakala	Pan-STARRS 1	·	2.2 km	MPC · JPL
599173	2009 SW_{391}	—	September 29, 2009	Mount Lemmon	Mount Lemmon Survey	L4	5.4 km	MPC · JPL
599174	2009 SG_{395}	—	June 29, 2014	Haleakala	Pan-STARRS 1	VER	2.1 km	MPC · JPL
599175	2009 SN_{395}	—	February 16, 2012	Haleakala	Pan-STARRS 1	·	2.6 km	MPC · JPL
599176	2009 SQ_{396}	—	September 24, 2009	Mount Lemmon	Mount Lemmon Survey	L4	6.0 km	MPC · JPL
599177	2009 SZ_{396}	—	September 30, 2009	Mount Lemmon	Mount Lemmon Survey	·	910 m	MPC · JPL
599178	2009 SB_{397}	—	September 29, 2009	Mount Lemmon	Mount Lemmon Survey	L4	7.9 km	MPC · JPL
599179	2009 SU_{397}	—	September 28, 2009	Mount Lemmon	Mount Lemmon Survey	L4	6.5 km	MPC · JPL
599180	2009 SR_{400}	—	September 17, 2009	Mount Lemmon	Mount Lemmon Survey	L4	7.2 km	MPC · JPL
599181	2009 SH_{401}	—	September 29, 2009	Kitt Peak	Spacewatch	WIT	750 m	MPC · JPL
599182	2009 SR_{408}	—	September 28, 2009	Mount Lemmon	Mount Lemmon Survey	L4	7.0 km	MPC · JPL
599183	2009 SD_{409}	—	September 25, 2009	Kitt Peak	Spacewatch	HNS	810 m	MPC · JPL
599184	2009 SY_{410}	—	September 27, 2009	Kitt Peak	Spacewatch	L4	6.8 km	MPC · JPL
599185	2009 SK_{412}	—	September 22, 2009	Kitt Peak	Spacewatch	L4	6.3 km	MPC · JPL
599186	2009 SR_{412}	—	September 28, 2009	Mount Lemmon	Mount Lemmon Survey	L4	5.9 km	MPC · JPL
599187	2009 SW_{414}	—	September 19, 2009	Kitt Peak	Spacewatch	L4 · (8060)	6.1 km	MPC · JPL
599188	2009 SY_{415}	—	September 29, 2009	Mount Lemmon	Mount Lemmon Survey	L4	6.9 km	MPC · JPL
599189	2009 SF_{416}	—	September 16, 2009	Kitt Peak	Spacewatch	·	1.4 km	MPC · JPL
599190	2009 SY_{416}	—	September 28, 2009	Mount Lemmon	Mount Lemmon Survey	VER	2.0 km	MPC · JPL
599191	2009 SH_{417}	—	September 25, 2009	Kitt Peak	Spacewatch	L4	5.8 km	MPC · JPL
599192	2009 TH	—	October 6, 2009	La Silla	A. Galád	·	1.5 km	MPC · JPL
599193	2009 TA_{16}	—	October 1, 2009	Mount Lemmon	Mount Lemmon Survey	·	1.6 km	MPC · JPL
599194	2009 TK_{17}	—	May 8, 2005	Kitt Peak	Spacewatch	·	790 m	MPC · JPL
599195	2009 TM_{19}	—	October 11, 2009	Mount Lemmon	Mount Lemmon Survey	L4	6.3 km	MPC · JPL
599196	2009 TL_{27}	—	October 14, 2009	La Sagra	OAM	PHO	780 m	MPC · JPL
599197	2009 TO_{28}	—	September 20, 2009	Kitt Peak	Spacewatch	·	1.1 km	MPC · JPL
599198	2009 TL_{30}	—	September 5, 2008	Kitt Peak	Spacewatch	L4	7.5 km	MPC · JPL
599199	2009 TL_{31}	—	October 15, 2009	Mount Lemmon	Mount Lemmon Survey	·	1.3 km	MPC · JPL
599200	2009 TW_{33}	—	September 25, 2009	La Sagra	OAM	·	3.3 km	MPC · JPL

== 599201–599300 ==
back to top

Designation			Discovery			Properties		Ref
Permanent	Provisional	Named after	Date	Site	Discoverer(s)	Category	Diam.	Ref
599201	2009 TX_{47}	—	September 18, 2003	Kitt Peak	Spacewatch	·	3.1 km	MPC · JPL
599202	2009 TZ_{49}	—	October 12, 2009	Mount Lemmon	Mount Lemmon Survey	·	860 m	MPC · JPL
599203	2009 TR_{50}	—	October 2, 2009	Mount Lemmon	Mount Lemmon Survey	PHO	830 m	MPC · JPL
599204	2009 TB_{53}	—	February 23, 2015	Haleakala	Pan-STARRS 1	L4	7.4 km	MPC · JPL
599205	2009 TG_{53}	—	October 14, 2009	Mount Lemmon	Mount Lemmon Survey	L4	5.6 km	MPC · JPL
599206	2009 TQ_{54}	—	September 23, 2005	Catalina	CSS	·	1.0 km	MPC · JPL
599207	2009 TK_{55}	—	October 8, 2009	La Sagra	OAM	·	1.8 km	MPC · JPL
599208	2009 UY	—	October 17, 2009	Tzec Maun	Nevski, V.	·	1.7 km	MPC · JPL
599209	2009 UH_{5}	—	October 18, 2009	Hibiscus	Teamo, N.	URS	2.9 km	MPC · JPL
599210	2009 UZ_{13}	—	September 16, 2009	Catalina	CSS	·	2.7 km	MPC · JPL
599211	2009 UZ_{18}	—	October 19, 2009	Sierra Stars	Dillon, W. G.	L4	6.2 km	MPC · JPL
599212	2009 UZ_{20}	—	October 22, 2009	Mount Lemmon	Mount Lemmon Survey	·	2.0 km	MPC · JPL
599213	2009 UN_{33}	—	October 25, 2005	Mount Lemmon	Mount Lemmon Survey	·	640 m	MPC · JPL
599214	2009 UW_{35}	—	September 15, 2009	Kitt Peak	Spacewatch	·	1.1 km	MPC · JPL
599215	2009 UU_{40}	—	September 22, 2009	Mount Lemmon	Mount Lemmon Survey	URS	2.6 km	MPC · JPL
599216	2009 UR_{44}	—	September 22, 2009	Mount Lemmon	Mount Lemmon Survey	L4	7.8 km	MPC · JPL
599217	2009 UB_{45}	—	September 22, 2009	Mount Lemmon	Mount Lemmon Survey	L4	7.6 km	MPC · JPL
599218	2009 UA_{49}	—	October 22, 2009	Mount Lemmon	Mount Lemmon Survey	·	850 m	MPC · JPL
599219	2009 UV_{49}	—	September 27, 2009	Kitt Peak	Spacewatch	L4	6.9 km	MPC · JPL
599220	2009 UU_{59}	—	July 3, 2005	Palomar	NEAT	NYS	910 m	MPC · JPL
599221	2009 UD_{60}	—	October 17, 2009	Mount Lemmon	Mount Lemmon Survey	·	980 m	MPC · JPL
599222	2009 UH_{62}	—	October 17, 2009	Mount Lemmon	Mount Lemmon Survey	L4	6.7 km	MPC · JPL
599223	2009 UQ_{64}	—	September 28, 2009	Mount Lemmon	Mount Lemmon Survey	L4	6.6 km	MPC · JPL
599224	2009 UN_{65}	—	October 17, 2009	Mount Lemmon	Mount Lemmon Survey	L4	5.7 km	MPC · JPL
599225	2009 UK_{69}	—	September 28, 2009	Mount Lemmon	Mount Lemmon Survey	·	2.2 km	MPC · JPL
599226	2009 UO_{72}	—	October 23, 2009	Mount Lemmon	Mount Lemmon Survey	·	3.3 km	MPC · JPL
599227	2009 UD_{78}	—	September 18, 2009	Kitt Peak	Spacewatch	L4	8.8 km	MPC · JPL
599228	2009 UN_{95}	—	September 15, 2009	Kitt Peak	Spacewatch	L4	9.5 km	MPC · JPL
599229	2009 UZ_{97}	—	October 23, 2009	Mount Lemmon	Mount Lemmon Survey	AEO	920 m	MPC · JPL
599230	2009 US_{101}	—	October 23, 2009	Mount Lemmon	Mount Lemmon Survey	·	1.1 km	MPC · JPL
599231	2009 UO_{111}	—	February 24, 2006	Catalina	CSS	EUN	1.6 km	MPC · JPL
599232	2009 UN_{114}	—	October 11, 2009	Mount Lemmon	Mount Lemmon Survey	NEM	1.9 km	MPC · JPL
599233	2009 UZ_{115}	—	October 21, 2009	Mount Lemmon	Mount Lemmon Survey	·	2.3 km	MPC · JPL
599234	2009 UO_{117}	—	October 14, 2009	Bergisch Gladbach	W. Bickel	L4	7.7 km	MPC · JPL
599235	2009 UC_{118}	—	September 27, 2009	Kitt Peak	Spacewatch	·	1.5 km	MPC · JPL
599236	2009 UK_{118}	—	September 15, 2009	Kitt Peak	Spacewatch	·	1.4 km	MPC · JPL
599237	2009 UP_{121}	—	September 16, 2009	Mount Lemmon	Mount Lemmon Survey	·	3.3 km	MPC · JPL
599238	2009 UK_{123}	—	October 26, 2009	Mount Lemmon	Mount Lemmon Survey	·	800 m	MPC · JPL
599239	2009 US_{123}	—	October 25, 2005	Mount Lemmon	Mount Lemmon Survey	HNS	940 m	MPC · JPL
599240	2009 UL_{125}	—	October 26, 2009	Mount Lemmon	Mount Lemmon Survey	EOS	1.4 km	MPC · JPL
599241	2009 UE_{129}	—	October 26, 2009	Mount Lemmon	Mount Lemmon Survey	L4	10 km	MPC · JPL
599242	2009 UA_{149}	—	September 21, 2009	Kitt Peak	Spacewatch	L4	6.5 km	MPC · JPL
599243	2009 UW_{160}	—	October 19, 2010	Mount Lemmon	Mount Lemmon Survey	L4	8.2 km	MPC · JPL
599244	2009 UJ_{161}	—	November 21, 2015	Mount Lemmon	Mount Lemmon Survey	·	2.6 km	MPC · JPL
599245	2009 UT_{161}	—	January 17, 2015	Mount Lemmon	Mount Lemmon Survey	·	1.1 km	MPC · JPL
599246	2009 UW_{161}	—	October 18, 2009	Mount Lemmon	Mount Lemmon Survey	MAR	640 m	MPC · JPL
599247	2009 UN_{162}	—	December 31, 2013	Haleakala	Pan-STARRS 1	·	1.0 km	MPC · JPL
599248	2009 UW_{162}	—	September 22, 2014	Haleakala	Pan-STARRS 1	VER	2.3 km	MPC · JPL
599249	2009 UN_{163}	—	September 9, 2015	Haleakala	Pan-STARRS 1	·	2.3 km	MPC · JPL
599250	2009 UJ_{166}	—	November 18, 2011	Mount Lemmon	Mount Lemmon Survey	L4 · HEK	9.1 km	MPC · JPL
599251	2009 UM_{166}	—	January 23, 2011	Mount Lemmon	Mount Lemmon Survey	VER	2.4 km	MPC · JPL
599252	2009 UV_{166}	—	April 10, 2013	Haleakala	Pan-STARRS 1	·	2.2 km	MPC · JPL
599253	2009 UE_{167}	—	January 14, 2018	Haleakala	Pan-STARRS 1	·	3.0 km	MPC · JPL
599254	2009 UD_{168}	—	January 18, 2013	Mount Lemmon	Mount Lemmon Survey	L4 · ERY	6.3 km	MPC · JPL
599255	2009 UW_{169}	—	October 27, 2009	Mount Lemmon	Mount Lemmon Survey	L4	6.7 km	MPC · JPL
599256	2009 UX_{169}	—	October 16, 2009	Mount Lemmon	Mount Lemmon Survey	L4	7.0 km	MPC · JPL
599257	2009 UC_{170}	—	June 11, 2007	Mauna Kea	D. D. Balam, K. M. Perrett	L4	6.9 km	MPC · JPL
599258	2009 UE_{170}	—	October 26, 2009	Mount Lemmon	Mount Lemmon Survey	L4	6.8 km	MPC · JPL
599259	2009 UG_{170}	—	October 25, 2009	Kitt Peak	Spacewatch	L4 · ERY	6.6 km	MPC · JPL
599260	2009 UD_{171}	—	March 16, 2013	Kitt Peak	Spacewatch	·	2.1 km	MPC · JPL
599261	2009 UY_{171}	—	June 15, 2018	Haleakala	Pan-STARRS 1	L4	7.3 km	MPC · JPL
599262	2009 UB_{173}	—	August 3, 2016	Haleakala	Pan-STARRS 1	MAS	480 m	MPC · JPL
599263	2009 UY_{173}	—	October 26, 2009	Kitt Peak	Spacewatch	L4 · ERY	7.9 km	MPC · JPL
599264	2009 UR_{174}	—	October 27, 2009	Mount Lemmon	Mount Lemmon Survey	·	2.2 km	MPC · JPL
599265	2009 UJ_{176}	—	October 23, 2009	Mount Lemmon	Mount Lemmon Survey	·	670 m	MPC · JPL
599266	2009 UB_{179}	—	October 24, 2009	Kitt Peak	Spacewatch	·	910 m	MPC · JPL
599267	2009 UW_{180}	—	October 16, 2009	Mount Lemmon	Mount Lemmon Survey	L4	6.3 km	MPC · JPL
599268	2009 UZ_{181}	—	October 27, 2009	Mount Lemmon	Mount Lemmon Survey	L4	6.6 km	MPC · JPL
599269	2009 UQ_{182}	—	October 24, 2009	Kitt Peak	Spacewatch	L4	8.7 km	MPC · JPL
599270	2009 UA_{184}	—	October 16, 2009	Mount Lemmon	Mount Lemmon Survey	L4	7.5 km	MPC · JPL
599271	2009 UF_{186}	—	October 16, 2009	Mount Lemmon	Mount Lemmon Survey	·	510 m	MPC · JPL
599272	2009 UW_{186}	—	October 18, 2009	Mount Lemmon	Mount Lemmon Survey	·	1.3 km	MPC · JPL
599273	2009 VD_{1}	—	October 17, 2009	Mount Lemmon	Mount Lemmon Survey	H	410 m	MPC · JPL
599274	2009 VV_{13}	—	November 8, 2009	Mount Lemmon	Mount Lemmon Survey	·	3.1 km	MPC · JPL
599275	2009 VD_{17}	—	November 8, 2009	Mount Lemmon	Mount Lemmon Survey	·	2.8 km	MPC · JPL
599276	2009 VS_{19}	—	November 9, 2009	Mount Lemmon	Mount Lemmon Survey	L4	5.7 km	MPC · JPL
599277	2009 VV_{35}	—	October 8, 2008	Mount Lemmon	Mount Lemmon Survey	L4	7.7 km	MPC · JPL
599278	2009 VE_{42}	—	November 9, 2009	Catalina	CSS	·	2.5 km	MPC · JPL
599279	2009 VV_{43}	—	August 25, 2005	Palomar	NEAT	·	1.1 km	MPC · JPL
599280	2009 VO_{54}	—	October 26, 2009	Kitt Peak	Spacewatch	·	1.1 km	MPC · JPL
599281	2009 VP_{55}	—	September 29, 2008	Mount Lemmon	Mount Lemmon Survey	L4	6.8 km	MPC · JPL
599282	2009 VL_{56}	—	February 7, 2002	La Silla	Barbieri, C.	HOF	2.0 km	MPC · JPL
599283	2009 VQ_{56}	—	September 5, 2008	Kitt Peak	Spacewatch	L4	6.3 km	MPC · JPL
599284	2009 VM_{65}	—	November 9, 2009	Kitt Peak	Spacewatch	·	2.8 km	MPC · JPL
599285	2009 VH_{71}	—	November 9, 2009	Mount Lemmon	Mount Lemmon Survey	EUN	1.1 km	MPC · JPL
599286	2009 VW_{88}	—	September 27, 2009	Kitt Peak	Spacewatch	L4	6.8 km	MPC · JPL
599287	2009 VP_{89}	—	November 11, 2009	Kitt Peak	Spacewatch	·	2.4 km	MPC · JPL
599288	2009 VX_{89}	—	November 11, 2009	Kitt Peak	Spacewatch	·	1.9 km	MPC · JPL
599289	2009 VL_{97}	—	November 9, 2009	Kitt Peak	Spacewatch	·	1.8 km	MPC · JPL
599290	2009 VG_{98}	—	November 9, 2009	Mount Lemmon	Mount Lemmon Survey	·	4.0 km	MPC · JPL
599291	2009 VE_{99}	—	November 9, 2009	Mount Lemmon	Mount Lemmon Survey	·	1.2 km	MPC · JPL
599292	2009 VK_{112}	—	August 27, 1998	Anderson Mesa	LONEOS	·	1.4 km	MPC · JPL
599293	2009 VE_{120}	—	March 29, 2015	Haleakala	Pan-STARRS 1	·	1.1 km	MPC · JPL
599294	2009 VL_{122}	—	February 16, 2013	Mount Lemmon	Mount Lemmon Survey	L4	6.3 km	MPC · JPL
599295	2009 VR_{122}	—	November 8, 2009	Kitt Peak	Spacewatch	·	3.3 km	MPC · JPL
599296	2009 VA_{127}	—	November 8, 2009	Mount Lemmon	Mount Lemmon Survey	L4	6.1 km	MPC · JPL
599297	2009 VC_{130}	—	November 8, 2009	Mount Lemmon	Mount Lemmon Survey	L4	7.5 km	MPC · JPL
599298	2009 VH_{130}	—	November 11, 2009	Kitt Peak	Spacewatch	·	1.6 km	MPC · JPL
599299	2009 VU_{130}	—	November 11, 2009	Mount Lemmon	Mount Lemmon Survey	·	2.7 km	MPC · JPL
599300	2009 WT_{6}	—	April 6, 2008	Mount Lemmon	Mount Lemmon Survey	·	830 m	MPC · JPL

== 599301–599400 ==
back to top

Designation			Discovery			Properties		Ref
Permanent	Provisional	Named after	Date	Site	Discoverer(s)	Category	Diam.	Ref
599301	2009 WV_{18}	—	November 17, 2009	Mount Lemmon	Mount Lemmon Survey	(5)	830 m	MPC · JPL
599302	2009 WY_{21}	—	October 11, 2009	Mount Lemmon	Mount Lemmon Survey	·	1.7 km	MPC · JPL
599303	2009 WN_{22}	—	November 18, 2009	Kitt Peak	Spacewatch	·	1.3 km	MPC · JPL
599304	2009 WY_{26}	—	September 19, 2009	Mount Lemmon	Mount Lemmon Survey	AEO	960 m	MPC · JPL
599305	2009 WL_{32}	—	October 14, 2009	Mount Lemmon	Mount Lemmon Survey	·	740 m	MPC · JPL
599306	2009 WP_{44}	—	November 18, 2009	Kitt Peak	Spacewatch	KOR	1.0 km	MPC · JPL
599307	2009 WD_{57}	—	October 23, 2009	Mount Lemmon	Mount Lemmon Survey	·	1.9 km	MPC · JPL
599308	2009 WY_{59}	—	November 16, 2009	Mount Lemmon	Mount Lemmon Survey	·	2.3 km	MPC · JPL
599309	2009 WK_{61}	—	October 25, 2009	Kitt Peak	Spacewatch	·	970 m	MPC · JPL
599310	2009 WU_{61}	—	September 19, 2014	Haleakala	Pan-STARRS 1	·	2.2 km	MPC · JPL
599311	2009 WK_{72}	—	November 4, 2005	Kitt Peak	Spacewatch	·	890 m	MPC · JPL
599312	2009 WZ_{77}	—	November 18, 2009	Kitt Peak	Spacewatch	·	2.7 km	MPC · JPL
599313	2009 WE_{91}	—	November 19, 2009	Mount Lemmon	Mount Lemmon Survey	·	890 m	MPC · JPL
599314	2009 WP_{108}	—	November 17, 2009	Mount Lemmon	Mount Lemmon Survey	L4	7.3 km	MPC · JPL
599315	2009 WW_{113}	—	November 18, 2009	Mount Lemmon	Mount Lemmon Survey	·	1.0 km	MPC · JPL
599316	2009 WX_{114}	—	October 22, 2009	Mount Lemmon	Mount Lemmon Survey	·	2.3 km	MPC · JPL
599317	2009 WB_{117}	—	November 20, 2009	Kitt Peak	Spacewatch	·	820 m	MPC · JPL
599318	2009 WG_{126}	—	June 11, 2004	Kitt Peak	Spacewatch	·	1.2 km	MPC · JPL
599319	2009 WG_{137}	—	October 25, 2009	Kitt Peak	Spacewatch	MAS	470 m	MPC · JPL
599320	2009 WU_{139}	—	September 18, 2009	Kitt Peak	Spacewatch	·	1.6 km	MPC · JPL
599321	2009 WA_{150}	—	October 14, 2009	Mount Lemmon	Mount Lemmon Survey	·	1.2 km	MPC · JPL
599322	2009 WF_{151}	—	September 22, 1995	Kitt Peak	Spacewatch	L4	7.8 km	MPC · JPL
599323	2009 WD_{154}	—	November 19, 2009	Mount Lemmon	Mount Lemmon Survey	·	1.5 km	MPC · JPL
599324	2009 WX_{154}	—	November 19, 2009	Mount Lemmon	Mount Lemmon Survey	·	910 m	MPC · JPL
599325	2009 WJ_{160}	—	November 21, 2009	Mount Lemmon	Mount Lemmon Survey	L4 · ERY	6.1 km	MPC · JPL
599326	2009 WE_{163}	—	November 21, 2009	La Sagra	OAM	H	590 m	MPC · JPL
599327	2009 WV_{167}	—	October 23, 2009	Kitt Peak	Spacewatch	·	1.5 km	MPC · JPL
599328	2009 WU_{169}	—	November 22, 2009	Kitt Peak	Spacewatch	·	900 m	MPC · JPL
599329	2009 WL_{176}	—	November 23, 2009	Kitt Peak	Spacewatch	EOS	1.8 km	MPC · JPL
599330	2009 WD_{179}	—	December 6, 2005	Kitt Peak	Spacewatch	·	970 m	MPC · JPL
599331	2009 WC_{180}	—	November 12, 2005	Kitt Peak	Spacewatch	PHO	980 m	MPC · JPL
599332	2009 WF_{194}	—	November 24, 2009	Kitt Peak	Spacewatch	·	930 m	MPC · JPL
599333	2009 WC_{218}	—	August 26, 2005	Palomar	NEAT	·	1.1 km	MPC · JPL
599334	2009 WO_{220}	—	November 16, 2009	Mount Lemmon	Mount Lemmon Survey	·	2.6 km	MPC · JPL
599335	2009 WY_{228}	—	April 7, 2008	Kitt Peak	Spacewatch	·	810 m	MPC · JPL
599336	2009 WK_{237}	—	February 21, 2007	Mount Lemmon	Mount Lemmon Survey	·	1.4 km	MPC · JPL
599337	2009 WT_{240}	—	June 2, 2003	Kitt Peak	Spacewatch	·	1.7 km	MPC · JPL
599338	2009 WV_{240}	—	November 18, 2009	Kitt Peak	Spacewatch	·	3.3 km	MPC · JPL
599339	2009 WW_{241}	—	April 25, 2007	Kitt Peak	Spacewatch	·	4.0 km	MPC · JPL
599340	2009 WD_{242}	—	November 18, 2009	Kitt Peak	Spacewatch	EUN	1.2 km	MPC · JPL
599341	2009 WX_{255}	—	November 20, 2009	Mount Lemmon	Mount Lemmon Survey	(5)	820 m	MPC · JPL
599342	2009 WO_{256}	—	October 24, 2003	Kitt Peak	Spacewatch	·	3.8 km	MPC · JPL
599343	2009 WB_{266}	—	November 16, 2009	Mount Lemmon	Mount Lemmon Survey	CLA	1.2 km	MPC · JPL
599344	2009 WB_{271}	—	June 5, 2016	Haleakala	Pan-STARRS 1	L4	8.2 km	MPC · JPL
599345	2009 WK_{271}	—	May 15, 2012	Haleakala	Pan-STARRS 1	·	1.1 km	MPC · JPL
599346	2009 WW_{271}	—	May 3, 2011	Kitt Peak	Spacewatch	HNS	1.2 km	MPC · JPL
599347	2009 WN_{272}	—	October 27, 2009	Kitt Peak	Spacewatch	·	980 m	MPC · JPL
599348	2009 WY_{272}	—	November 20, 2009	Mount Lemmon	Mount Lemmon Survey	·	1.0 km	MPC · JPL
599349	2009 WH_{273}	—	June 8, 2016	Haleakala	Pan-STARRS 1	(194)	1.4 km	MPC · JPL
599350	2009 WJ_{273}	—	March 6, 2011	Mount Lemmon	Mount Lemmon Survey	·	1.8 km	MPC · JPL
599351	2009 WT_{273}	—	November 17, 2009	Kitt Peak	Spacewatch	·	980 m	MPC · JPL
599352	2009 WD_{274}	—	January 1, 2014	Mount Lemmon	Mount Lemmon Survey	·	1.1 km	MPC · JPL
599353	2009 WC_{279}	—	November 8, 2010	Kitt Peak	Spacewatch	L4	7.5 km	MPC · JPL
599354	2009 WX_{284}	—	October 4, 1996	Kitt Peak	Spacewatch	L4	7.5 km	MPC · JPL
599355	2009 WS_{289}	—	November 25, 2009	Kitt Peak	Spacewatch	·	880 m	MPC · JPL
599356	2009 WP_{295}	—	November 23, 2009	Mount Lemmon	Mount Lemmon Survey	·	710 m	MPC · JPL
599357	2009 WV_{295}	—	November 22, 2009	Mount Lemmon	Mount Lemmon Survey	EOS	1.5 km	MPC · JPL
599358	2009 WJ_{298}	—	November 23, 2009	Mount Lemmon	Mount Lemmon Survey	·	2.4 km	MPC · JPL
599359	2009 XX_{4}	—	September 14, 2005	Catalina	CSS	·	1.0 km	MPC · JPL
599360	2009 XE_{22}	—	March 15, 2001	Kitt Peak	Spacewatch	VER	3.1 km	MPC · JPL
599361	2009 YD_{4}	—	November 16, 2009	Mount Lemmon	Mount Lemmon Survey	(5)	960 m	MPC · JPL
599362	2009 YE_{8}	—	October 15, 2009	Mount Lemmon	Mount Lemmon Survey	·	1.5 km	MPC · JPL
599363	2009 YJ_{13}	—	December 18, 2009	Mount Lemmon	Mount Lemmon Survey	·	1.0 km	MPC · JPL
599364	2009 YN_{17}	—	September 21, 2001	Kitt Peak	Spacewatch	·	1.6 km	MPC · JPL
599365	2009 YX_{26}	—	December 19, 2009	Mount Lemmon	Mount Lemmon Survey	(5)	1.0 km	MPC · JPL
599366	2009 YD_{29}	—	December 18, 2009	Mount Lemmon	Mount Lemmon Survey	MRX	970 m	MPC · JPL
599367	2009 YG_{29}	—	November 28, 2013	Mount Lemmon	Mount Lemmon Survey	·	1.2 km	MPC · JPL
599368	2009 YE_{30}	—	November 25, 2009	Mount Lemmon	Mount Lemmon Survey	MRX	750 m	MPC · JPL
599369	2009 YT_{30}	—	August 2, 2016	Haleakala	Pan-STARRS 1	·	890 m	MPC · JPL
599370	2009 YM_{32}	—	December 19, 2009	Kitt Peak	Spacewatch	·	1.1 km	MPC · JPL
599371	2009 YT_{32}	—	December 16, 2009	Mount Lemmon	Mount Lemmon Survey	·	1.5 km	MPC · JPL
599372	2010 AH_{16}	—	January 7, 2010	Mount Lemmon	Mount Lemmon Survey	·	870 m	MPC · JPL
599373	2010 AT_{29}	—	January 8, 2010	Kitt Peak	Spacewatch	·	1.2 km	MPC · JPL
599374	2010 AZ_{35}	—	January 7, 2006	Mount Lemmon	Mount Lemmon Survey	·	890 m	MPC · JPL
599375	2010 AT_{38}	—	February 6, 2006	Kitt Peak	Spacewatch	(5)	1.2 km	MPC · JPL
599376	2010 AL_{39}	—	January 10, 2010	Mount Lemmon	Mount Lemmon Survey	·	1.6 km	MPC · JPL
599377	2010 AK_{54}	—	December 15, 2009	Mount Lemmon	Mount Lemmon Survey	·	1.3 km	MPC · JPL
599378	2010 AP_{58}	—	January 11, 2010	Kitt Peak	Spacewatch	·	1.3 km	MPC · JPL
599379	2010 AT_{60}	—	January 14, 2010	Kachina	Hobart, J.	H	670 m	MPC · JPL
599380	2010 AF_{62}	—	January 22, 2002	Kitt Peak	Spacewatch	·	920 m	MPC · JPL
599381	2010 AJ_{63}	—	January 8, 2010	Mount Lemmon	Mount Lemmon Survey	·	810 m	MPC · JPL
599382	2010 AZ_{66}	—	July 7, 2003	Kitt Peak	Spacewatch	HNS	1.3 km	MPC · JPL
599383	2010 AK_{143}	—	January 7, 2010	Mount Lemmon	Mount Lemmon Survey	·	990 m	MPC · JPL
599384	2010 AQ_{145}	—	November 15, 2010	Mount Lemmon	Mount Lemmon Survey	EUP	3.8 km	MPC · JPL
599385	2010 AA_{152}	—	September 29, 2009	Mount Lemmon	Mount Lemmon Survey	·	820 m	MPC · JPL
599386	2010 AQ_{154}	—	April 28, 2011	Mount Lemmon	Mount Lemmon Survey	·	1.4 km	MPC · JPL
599387	2010 AW_{154}	—	July 13, 2013	Haleakala	Pan-STARRS 1	·	3.5 km	MPC · JPL
599388	2010 AP_{155}	—	November 10, 2013	Mount Lemmon	Mount Lemmon Survey	·	1.9 km	MPC · JPL
599389	2010 AE_{158}	—	November 9, 2013	Haleakala	Pan-STARRS 1	·	1.1 km	MPC · JPL
599390	2010 AY_{161}	—	January 7, 2010	Kitt Peak	Spacewatch	·	1.3 km	MPC · JPL
599391	2010 BF_{137}	—	September 9, 2008	Mount Lemmon	Mount Lemmon Survey	L4	7.2 km	MPC · JPL
599392	2010 BJ_{141}	—	April 17, 2010	Mount Lemmon	Mount Lemmon Survey	·	1.9 km	MPC · JPL
599393	2010 BB_{151}	—	December 31, 2013	Haleakala	Pan-STARRS 1	·	1.3 km	MPC · JPL
599394	2010 CX_{22}	—	February 9, 2010	Kitt Peak	Spacewatch	H	410 m	MPC · JPL
599395	2010 CC_{27}	—	March 5, 2006	Mount Lemmon	Mount Lemmon Survey	·	1.4 km	MPC · JPL
599396	2010 CU_{30}	—	September 26, 2008	Kitt Peak	Spacewatch	·	2.1 km	MPC · JPL
599397	2010 CX_{40}	—	February 13, 2010	Kitt Peak	Spacewatch	·	1.4 km	MPC · JPL
599398	2010 CT_{41}	—	December 27, 2009	Kitt Peak	Spacewatch	HNS	990 m	MPC · JPL
599399	2010 CY_{61}	—	January 8, 2010	Mount Lemmon	Mount Lemmon Survey	·	1.2 km	MPC · JPL
599400	2010 CK_{84}	—	February 14, 2010	Kitt Peak	Spacewatch	HNS	970 m	MPC · JPL

== 599401–599500 ==
back to top

Designation			Discovery			Properties		Ref
Permanent	Provisional	Named after	Date	Site	Discoverer(s)	Category	Diam.	Ref
599401	2010 CY_{84}	—	February 14, 2010	Kitt Peak	Spacewatch	·	1.3 km	MPC · JPL
599402	2010 CN_{87}	—	May 2, 2006	Mount Lemmon	Mount Lemmon Survey	·	1.6 km	MPC · JPL
599403	2010 CO_{94}	—	January 26, 2001	Kitt Peak	Spacewatch	·	1.8 km	MPC · JPL
599404	2010 CH_{100}	—	February 14, 2010	Mount Lemmon	Mount Lemmon Survey	MAR	880 m	MPC · JPL
599405	2010 CZ_{108}	—	September 5, 2008	Kitt Peak	Spacewatch	·	1.3 km	MPC · JPL
599406	2010 CB_{123}	—	February 25, 2006	Kitt Peak	Spacewatch	·	1.3 km	MPC · JPL
599407	2010 CH_{149}	—	January 10, 2010	Kitt Peak	Spacewatch	·	1.7 km	MPC · JPL
599408	2010 CP_{150}	—	January 8, 2010	Kitt Peak	Spacewatch	JUN	1.0 km	MPC · JPL
599409	2010 CV_{156}	—	February 15, 2010	Mount Lemmon	Mount Lemmon Survey	·	1.1 km	MPC · JPL
599410	2010 CZ_{156}	—	February 15, 2010	Mount Lemmon	Mount Lemmon Survey	MAR	880 m	MPC · JPL
599411	2010 CT_{157}	—	February 15, 2010	Kitt Peak	Spacewatch	·	1.8 km	MPC · JPL
599412	2010 CD_{162}	—	February 9, 2010	Kitt Peak	Spacewatch	GEF	1.2 km	MPC · JPL
599413	2010 CN_{176}	—	September 12, 2007	Kitt Peak	Spacewatch	·	1.6 km	MPC · JPL
599414	2010 CT_{255}	—	July 11, 2016	Haleakala	Pan-STARRS 1	·	1.3 km	MPC · JPL
599415	2010 CZ_{262}	—	May 21, 2012	Mount Lemmon	Mount Lemmon Survey	LUT	3.1 km	MPC · JPL
599416	2010 CY_{263}	—	August 15, 2013	Haleakala	Pan-STARRS 1	·	2.6 km	MPC · JPL
599417	2010 CS_{270}	—	February 5, 2014	Catalina	CSS	·	1.1 km	MPC · JPL
599418	2010 CV_{272}	—	December 13, 2013	Mount Lemmon	Mount Lemmon Survey	·	1.2 km	MPC · JPL
599419	2010 CY_{273}	—	May 21, 2015	Haleakala	Pan-STARRS 1	·	1.2 km	MPC · JPL
599420	2010 DW	—	February 16, 2010	Needville	C. Sexton, J. Dellinger	·	2.1 km	MPC · JPL
599421	2010 DU_{43}	—	February 17, 2010	Kitt Peak	Spacewatch	·	850 m	MPC · JPL
599422	2010 DB_{50}	—	February 16, 2010	Mount Lemmon	Mount Lemmon Survey	KOR	1.1 km	MPC · JPL
599423	2010 DQ_{102}	—	November 10, 2009	Kitt Peak	Spacewatch	·	1.8 km	MPC · JPL
599424	2010 DT_{106}	—	September 21, 2012	Mount Lemmon	Mount Lemmon Survey	·	1.2 km	MPC · JPL
599425	2010 DT_{109}	—	February 17, 2010	Kitt Peak	Spacewatch	·	1.4 km	MPC · JPL
599426	2010 DS_{110}	—	February 17, 2010	Kitt Peak	Spacewatch	·	960 m	MPC · JPL
599427	2010 EB_{32}	—	March 4, 2010	Kitt Peak	Spacewatch	·	2.2 km	MPC · JPL
599428	2010 ET_{32}	—	April 2, 2006	Kitt Peak	Spacewatch	·	1.5 km	MPC · JPL
599429	2010 EY_{32}	—	April 26, 2006	Kitt Peak	Spacewatch	·	1.6 km	MPC · JPL
599430	2010 EF_{45}	—	February 17, 2010	Kitt Peak	Spacewatch	·	1.3 km	MPC · JPL
599431	2010 EM_{66}	—	March 14, 2010	Mount Lemmon	Mount Lemmon Survey	WIT	950 m	MPC · JPL
599432	2010 EC_{69}	—	March 12, 2010	Kitt Peak	Spacewatch	·	1.4 km	MPC · JPL
599433	2010 EN_{75}	—	October 23, 2003	Apache Point	SDSS Collaboration	·	1.7 km	MPC · JPL
599434	2010 EW_{75}	—	March 12, 2010	Kitt Peak	Spacewatch	·	1.2 km	MPC · JPL
599435	2010 EB_{76}	—	March 12, 2010	Kitt Peak	Spacewatch	HNS	900 m	MPC · JPL
599436	2010 EB_{85}	—	March 27, 1995	Kitt Peak	Spacewatch	·	2.0 km	MPC · JPL
599437	2010 EV_{85}	—	January 12, 2010	Kitt Peak	Spacewatch	·	1.1 km	MPC · JPL
599438	2010 EV_{92}	—	April 7, 2007	Mount Lemmon	Mount Lemmon Survey	·	630 m	MPC · JPL
599439	2010 EB_{96}	—	March 14, 2010	Mount Lemmon	Mount Lemmon Survey	KOR	1.2 km	MPC · JPL
599440	2010 EG_{96}	—	March 14, 2010	Mount Lemmon	Mount Lemmon Survey	·	1.2 km	MPC · JPL
599441	2010 EQ_{96}	—	March 14, 2010	Mount Lemmon	Mount Lemmon Survey	KOR	1.1 km	MPC · JPL
599442	2010 ET_{97}	—	March 14, 2010	Mount Lemmon	Mount Lemmon Survey	·	1.9 km	MPC · JPL
599443	2010 EJ_{108}	—	March 13, 2010	Kitt Peak	Spacewatch	·	1.7 km	MPC · JPL
599444	2010 ER_{121}	—	March 30, 2000	Kitt Peak	Spacewatch	·	490 m	MPC · JPL
599445	2010 EL_{143}	—	March 12, 2010	Kitt Peak	Spacewatch	·	460 m	MPC · JPL
599446	2010 EY_{187}	—	March 13, 2010	Catalina	CSS	·	1.2 km	MPC · JPL
599447	2010 EG_{188}	—	March 12, 2010	Mount Lemmon	Mount Lemmon Survey	·	680 m	MPC · JPL
599448	2010 FD_{4}	—	February 19, 2010	Mount Lemmon	Mount Lemmon Survey	·	1.6 km	MPC · JPL
599449	2010 FM_{16}	—	August 30, 2002	Palomar	NEAT	DOR	2.0 km	MPC · JPL
599450	2010 FF_{17}	—	March 12, 2010	Kitt Peak	Spacewatch	·	600 m	MPC · JPL
599451	2010 FC_{22}	—	March 18, 2010	Mount Lemmon	Mount Lemmon Survey	·	1.5 km	MPC · JPL
599452	2010 FB_{25}	—	March 18, 2010	Mount Lemmon	Mount Lemmon Survey	·	520 m	MPC · JPL
599453	2010 FZ_{48}	—	November 19, 2008	Mount Lemmon	Mount Lemmon Survey	·	680 m	MPC · JPL
599454	2010 FU_{85}	—	April 26, 2006	Kitt Peak	Spacewatch	·	1.5 km	MPC · JPL
599455	2010 FC_{89}	—	March 17, 2010	Kitt Peak	Spacewatch	LEO	1.7 km	MPC · JPL
599456	2010 FK_{90}	—	March 20, 2010	Kitt Peak	Spacewatch	·	1.7 km	MPC · JPL
599457	2010 FS_{92}	—	March 21, 2010	Catalina	CSS	·	2.1 km	MPC · JPL
599458	2010 FO_{130}	—	February 2, 2009	Kitt Peak	Spacewatch	·	1.9 km	MPC · JPL
599459	2010 FK_{137}	—	April 24, 2015	Haleakala	Pan-STARRS 1	·	2.2 km	MPC · JPL
599460	2010 FR_{137}	—	February 11, 2014	Mount Lemmon	Mount Lemmon Survey	·	1.1 km	MPC · JPL
599461	2010 FA_{138}	—	August 29, 2011	Andrushivka	Y. Ivaščenko, Kyrylenko, P.	·	2.4 km	MPC · JPL
599462	2010 FY_{138}	—	March 18, 2010	Kitt Peak	Spacewatch	·	1.5 km	MPC · JPL
599463	2010 FD_{140}	—	July 28, 2011	Haleakala	Pan-STARRS 1	·	930 m	MPC · JPL
599464	2010 FT_{141}	—	March 20, 2010	Kitt Peak	Spacewatch	·	1.2 km	MPC · JPL
599465	2010 FX_{142}	—	March 18, 2010	Mount Lemmon	Mount Lemmon Survey	·	470 m	MPC · JPL
599466	2010 FZ_{142}	—	March 18, 2010	Mount Lemmon	Mount Lemmon Survey	KOR	1.1 km	MPC · JPL
599467	2010 GL_{6}	—	March 13, 2010	Mount Lemmon	Mount Lemmon Survey	·	1.7 km	MPC · JPL
599468	2010 GB_{25}	—	April 9, 2010	Nogales	M. Schwartz, L. Elenin	MAR	970 m	MPC · JPL
599469	2010 GH_{25}	—	April 4, 2002	Palomar	NEAT	H	480 m	MPC · JPL
599470	2010 GT_{32}	—	March 19, 2010	Kitt Peak	Spacewatch	·	1.2 km	MPC · JPL
599471	2010 GU_{34}	—	April 10, 2010	Mount Lemmon	Mount Lemmon Survey	·	580 m	MPC · JPL
599472	2010 GT_{74}	—	November 30, 2008	Kitt Peak	Spacewatch	·	2.1 km	MPC · JPL
599473	2010 GG_{99}	—	April 4, 2010	Kitt Peak	Spacewatch	·	1.4 km	MPC · JPL
599474	2010 GC_{100}	—	April 4, 2010	Kitt Peak	Spacewatch	·	710 m	MPC · JPL
599475	2010 GC_{105}	—	October 8, 2007	Mount Lemmon	Mount Lemmon Survey	·	1.7 km	MPC · JPL
599476	2010 GP_{106}	—	April 8, 2010	Kitt Peak	Spacewatch	EUN	1.0 km	MPC · JPL
599477	2010 GT_{107}	—	October 9, 2007	Kitt Peak	Spacewatch	EOS	1.6 km	MPC · JPL
599478	2010 GM_{110}	—	July 24, 2003	Palomar	NEAT	·	1.3 km	MPC · JPL
599479	2010 GR_{111}	—	September 14, 2007	Mount Lemmon	Mount Lemmon Survey	·	1.7 km	MPC · JPL
599480	2010 GT_{115}	—	April 21, 2006	Kitt Peak	Spacewatch	·	1.0 km	MPC · JPL
599481	2010 GY_{118}	—	April 11, 2010	Kitt Peak	Spacewatch	·	1.4 km	MPC · JPL
599482	2010 GM_{121}	—	December 20, 2004	Mount Lemmon	Mount Lemmon Survey	·	1.5 km	MPC · JPL
599483	2010 GZ_{121}	—	January 1, 2009	Kitt Peak	Spacewatch	·	2.3 km	MPC · JPL
599484	2010 GN_{125}	—	March 9, 2005	Catalina	CSS	·	1.9 km	MPC · JPL
599485	2010 GX_{133}	—	April 12, 2010	Mount Lemmon	Mount Lemmon Survey	·	1.2 km	MPC · JPL
599486	2010 GK_{135}	—	April 4, 2010	Kitt Peak	Spacewatch	·	1 km	MPC · JPL
599487	2010 GW_{136}	—	March 25, 2006	Kitt Peak	Spacewatch	·	1.5 km	MPC · JPL
599488	2010 GM_{142}	—	April 9, 2010	Mount Lemmon	Mount Lemmon Survey	·	1.7 km	MPC · JPL
599489	2010 GE_{172}	—	May 5, 2010	Catalina	CSS	·	1.9 km	MPC · JPL
599490	2010 GK_{177}	—	November 24, 2017	Haleakala	Pan-STARRS 1	·	900 m	MPC · JPL
599491	2010 GK_{199}	—	January 21, 2013	Mount Lemmon	Mount Lemmon Survey	·	760 m	MPC · JPL
599492	2010 GT_{199}	—	October 21, 2012	Haleakala	Pan-STARRS 1	·	1.6 km	MPC · JPL
599493	2010 GA_{201}	—	January 26, 2014	Calar Alto-CASADO	Mottola, S., Hellmich, S.	·	1.1 km	MPC · JPL
599494	2010 GJ_{202}	—	January 10, 2014	Mount Lemmon	Mount Lemmon Survey	·	1.9 km	MPC · JPL
599495	2010 GG_{203}	—	April 14, 2010	Mount Lemmon	Mount Lemmon Survey	·	1.5 km	MPC · JPL
599496	2010 GQ_{203}	—	April 10, 2010	Kitt Peak	Spacewatch	3:2	3.8 km	MPC · JPL
599497	2010 HH_{59}	—	April 16, 2010	Bergisch Gladbach	W. Bickel	·	1.3 km	MPC · JPL
599498	2010 HL_{106}	—	April 20, 2010	Kitt Peak	Spacewatch	·	1.6 km	MPC · JPL
599499	2010 HR_{108}	—	April 10, 2010	Kitt Peak	Spacewatch	·	2.1 km	MPC · JPL
599500	2010 HO_{117}	—	December 27, 2016	Mount Lemmon	Mount Lemmon Survey	·	1.5 km	MPC · JPL

== 599501–599600 ==
back to top

Designation			Discovery			Properties		Ref
Permanent	Provisional	Named after	Date	Site	Discoverer(s)	Category	Diam.	Ref
599501	2010 HS_{121}	—	May 20, 2015	Haleakala	Pan-STARRS 1	·	1.0 km	MPC · JPL
599502	2010 HJ_{136}	—	July 2, 2011	Mount Lemmon	Mount Lemmon Survey	·	1.5 km	MPC · JPL
599503	2010 HS_{138}	—	February 5, 2013	Kitt Peak	Spacewatch	·	500 m	MPC · JPL
599504	2010 HY_{138}	—	April 20, 2010	Mount Lemmon	Mount Lemmon Survey	HNS	790 m	MPC · JPL
599505	2010 HT_{139}	—	October 19, 2003	Kitt Peak	Spacewatch	·	1.4 km	MPC · JPL
599506	2010 JZ_{1}	—	May 3, 2010	Kitt Peak	Spacewatch	·	540 m	MPC · JPL
599507	2010 JR_{2}	—	May 5, 2010	Mount Lemmon	Mount Lemmon Survey	·	1.5 km	MPC · JPL
599508	2010 JZ_{30}	—	May 4, 2010	Catalina	CSS	·	1.6 km	MPC · JPL
599509	2010 JO_{35}	—	April 10, 2010	Mount Lemmon	Mount Lemmon Survey	·	1.5 km	MPC · JPL
599510	2010 JX_{40}	—	May 7, 2010	Kitt Peak	Spacewatch	·	1.8 km	MPC · JPL
599511	2010 JG_{45}	—	April 15, 2010	Kitt Peak	Spacewatch	·	1.8 km	MPC · JPL
599512	2010 JH_{47}	—	December 22, 2008	Kitt Peak	Spacewatch	PAD	1.4 km	MPC · JPL
599513	2010 JT_{74}	—	October 18, 2007	Kitt Peak	Spacewatch	·	1.4 km	MPC · JPL
599514	2010 JO_{75}	—	May 4, 2010	Kitt Peak	Spacewatch	·	600 m	MPC · JPL
599515	2010 JL_{112}	—	May 12, 2010	Kitt Peak	Spacewatch	·	510 m	MPC · JPL
599516	2010 JF_{113}	—	May 7, 2010	Mount Lemmon	Mount Lemmon Survey	·	570 m	MPC · JPL
599517	2010 JG_{113}	—	October 20, 2007	Mount Lemmon	Mount Lemmon Survey	·	1.8 km	MPC · JPL
599518	2010 JZ_{117}	—	May 8, 2010	Mount Lemmon	Mount Lemmon Survey	·	1.8 km	MPC · JPL
599519	2010 JT_{120}	—	May 12, 2010	Mount Lemmon	Mount Lemmon Survey	·	1.3 km	MPC · JPL
599520	2010 JS_{155}	—	February 8, 2000	Kitt Peak	Spacewatch	·	1.5 km	MPC · JPL
599521	2010 JX_{155}	—	May 11, 2010	Mount Lemmon	Mount Lemmon Survey	·	620 m	MPC · JPL
599522	2010 JL_{158}	—	May 14, 2010	Mount Lemmon	Mount Lemmon Survey	·	2.5 km	MPC · JPL
599523	2010 JN_{159}	—	April 8, 2010	Mount Lemmon	Mount Lemmon Survey	615	1.3 km	MPC · JPL
599524	2010 JN_{162}	—	October 17, 2007	Mount Lemmon	Mount Lemmon Survey	·	1.8 km	MPC · JPL
599525	2010 JC_{164}	—	November 30, 2008	Kitt Peak	Spacewatch	·	780 m	MPC · JPL
599526	2010 JG_{165}	—	October 19, 2007	Catalina	CSS	·	1.8 km	MPC · JPL
599527	2010 JU_{166}	—	March 18, 2005	Catalina	CSS	·	1.9 km	MPC · JPL
599528	2010 JL_{173}	—	May 22, 2015	Haleakala	Pan-STARRS 1	·	1.3 km	MPC · JPL
599529	2010 JG_{197}	—	March 23, 2015	Kitt Peak	Spacewatch	·	1.5 km	MPC · JPL
599530	2010 JS_{207}	—	January 27, 2015	Haleakala	Pan-STARRS 1	·	1.8 km	MPC · JPL
599531	2010 JT_{207}	—	March 29, 2006	Kitt Peak	Spacewatch	ADE	1.6 km	MPC · JPL
599532	2010 JN_{210}	—	November 15, 2014	Mount Lemmon	Mount Lemmon Survey	·	900 m	MPC · JPL
599533	2010 JP_{211}	—	November 28, 2011	Kitt Peak	Spacewatch	H	430 m	MPC · JPL
599534	2010 JT_{211}	—	April 28, 2000	Kitt Peak	Spacewatch	·	710 m	MPC · JPL
599535	2010 JF_{212}	—	September 18, 2011	Mount Lemmon	Mount Lemmon Survey	·	1.4 km	MPC · JPL
599536	2010 JQ_{212}	—	January 21, 2014	Mount Lemmon	Mount Lemmon Survey	·	1.4 km	MPC · JPL
599537	2010 JU_{214}	—	May 7, 2010	Mount Lemmon	Mount Lemmon Survey	·	590 m	MPC · JPL
599538	2010 KM_{37}	—	May 16, 2010	Kitt Peak	Spacewatch	·	1.5 km	MPC · JPL
599539	2010 KV_{38}	—	May 19, 2010	Mount Lemmon	Mount Lemmon Survey	·	1.4 km	MPC · JPL
599540	2010 KW_{61}	—	May 24, 2006	Mount Lemmon	Mount Lemmon Survey	·	1.7 km	MPC · JPL
599541	2010 KL_{146}	—	March 2, 2016	Haleakala	Pan-STARRS 1	L5	7.3 km	MPC · JPL
599542	2010 KS_{148}	—	May 25, 2010	WISE	WISE	·	1.3 km	MPC · JPL
599543	2010 KU_{149}	—	December 26, 2011	Mount Lemmon	Mount Lemmon Survey	·	1.7 km	MPC · JPL
599544	2010 KL_{152}	—	May 23, 2014	Haleakala	Pan-STARRS 1	·	1.9 km	MPC · JPL
599545	2010 KF_{155}	—	February 28, 2008	Mount Lemmon	Mount Lemmon Survey	·	1.7 km	MPC · JPL
599546	2010 KX_{156}	—	May 4, 2005	Mauna Kea	Veillet, C.	·	1.5 km	MPC · JPL
599547	2010 KY_{156}	—	September 23, 2011	Haleakala	Pan-STARRS 1	·	640 m	MPC · JPL
599548	2010 KQ_{157}	—	May 21, 2010	Mount Lemmon	Mount Lemmon Survey	(1547)	1.1 km	MPC · JPL
599549	2010 KU_{157}	—	January 24, 2014	Haleakala	Pan-STARRS 1	·	2.2 km	MPC · JPL
599550	2010 KW_{157}	—	May 17, 2010	Nogales	M. Schwartz, P. R. Holvorcem	JUN	1.1 km	MPC · JPL
599551	2010 LU_{34}	—	May 11, 2010	Mount Lemmon	Mount Lemmon Survey	·	570 m	MPC · JPL
599552	2010 LW_{63}	—	June 10, 2010	Mount Lemmon	Mount Lemmon Survey	H	550 m	MPC · JPL
599553	2010 LP_{110}	—	June 13, 2010	Mount Lemmon	Mount Lemmon Survey	·	550 m	MPC · JPL
599554	2010 LJ_{135}	—	May 8, 2006	Mount Lemmon	Mount Lemmon Survey	·	2.2 km	MPC · JPL
599555	2010 LL_{139}	—	October 8, 2008	Mount Lemmon	Mount Lemmon Survey	·	1.7 km	MPC · JPL
599556	2010 LL_{142}	—	December 4, 2012	Mount Lemmon	Mount Lemmon Survey	·	1.3 km	MPC · JPL
599557	2010 LB_{145}	—	October 29, 2000	Kitt Peak	Spacewatch	·	1.6 km	MPC · JPL
599558	2010 LV_{150}	—	December 30, 2013	Kitt Peak	Spacewatch	·	1.7 km	MPC · JPL
599559	2010 LL_{153}	—	November 25, 2016	Mount Lemmon	Mount Lemmon Survey	KON	2.6 km	MPC · JPL
599560	2010 LF_{154}	—	October 12, 2016	Haleakala	Pan-STARRS 1	·	2.1 km	MPC · JPL
599561	2010 LG_{159}	—	June 14, 2010	Mount Lemmon	Mount Lemmon Survey	·	810 m	MPC · JPL
599562	2010 MK_{3}	—	June 17, 2010	Mount Lemmon	Mount Lemmon Survey	·	1.7 km	MPC · JPL
599563	2010 MK_{5}	—	June 20, 2010	ESA OGS	ESA OGS	·	920 m	MPC · JPL
599564	2010 MW_{124}	—	March 6, 2008	Mount Lemmon	Mount Lemmon Survey	·	1.8 km	MPC · JPL
599565	2010 MH_{129}	—	December 30, 2013	Haleakala	Pan-STARRS 1	·	1.2 km	MPC · JPL
599566	2010 MX_{131}	—	June 25, 2015	Haleakala	Pan-STARRS 2	T_{j} (2.99)	3.8 km	MPC · JPL
599567	2010 MJ_{135}	—	January 17, 2015	Mount Lemmon	Mount Lemmon Survey	·	2.1 km	MPC · JPL
599568	2010 MT_{136}	—	August 21, 2015	Haleakala	Pan-STARRS 1	·	1.1 km	MPC · JPL
599569	2010 MF_{147}	—	June 26, 2015	Haleakala	Pan-STARRS 1	BRA	1.5 km	MPC · JPL
599570	2010 MY_{147}	—	June 19, 2010	Mount Lemmon	Mount Lemmon Survey	L5	8.9 km	MPC · JPL
599571	2010 NP_{3}	—	October 8, 2007	Mount Lemmon	Mount Lemmon Survey	·	760 m	MPC · JPL
599572	2010 NN_{6}	—	July 7, 2010	Mount Lemmon	Mount Lemmon Survey	·	2.0 km	MPC · JPL
599573	2010 NL_{32}	—	July 7, 2010	WISE	WISE	·	3.6 km	MPC · JPL
599574	2010 NF_{48}	—	July 9, 2010	WISE	WISE	·	3.3 km	MPC · JPL
599575	2010 NL_{58}	—	July 10, 2010	WISE	WISE	EOS	1.4 km	MPC · JPL
599576	2010 NB_{66}	—	July 6, 2010	Catalina	CSS	·	1.4 km	MPC · JPL
599577	2010 NK_{99}	—	January 10, 2007	Kitt Peak	Spacewatch	·	2.3 km	MPC · JPL
599578	2010 NE_{121}	—	October 22, 2012	Haleakala	Pan-STARRS 1	·	1.7 km	MPC · JPL
599579	2010 NW_{135}	—	December 22, 2008	Mount Lemmon	Mount Lemmon Survey	·	1.5 km	MPC · JPL
599580	2010 ND_{139}	—	January 4, 2014	Haleakala	Pan-STARRS 1	·	2.7 km	MPC · JPL
599581	2010 NG_{145}	—	November 27, 2017	Calar Alto-CASADO	Hellmich, S., Mottola, S.	·	2.1 km	MPC · JPL
599582	2010 ON_{126}	—	July 19, 2010	Bergisch Gladbach	W. Bickel	·	1.9 km	MPC · JPL
599583	2010 OU_{132}	—	August 22, 2017	XuYi	PMO NEO Survey Program	·	900 m	MPC · JPL
599584	2010 OU_{140}	—	January 16, 2009	Kitt Peak	Spacewatch	HOF	2.2 km	MPC · JPL
599585	2010 OK_{142}	—	April 10, 2015	Mount Lemmon	Mount Lemmon Survey	·	1.8 km	MPC · JPL
599586	2010 OY_{142}	—	June 24, 2015	Haleakala	Pan-STARRS 1	EOS	1.7 km	MPC · JPL
599587 Shangjiaouni	2010 PN_{9}	Shangjiaouni	September 21, 2007	XuYi	PMO NEO Survey Program	·	570 m	MPC · JPL
599588	2010 PP_{9}	—	August 4, 2010	Socorro	LINEAR	NYS	680 m	MPC · JPL
599589	2010 PU_{76}	—	July 29, 2001	Palomar	NEAT	·	1.9 km	MPC · JPL
599590	2010 PP_{84}	—	May 22, 2015	Haleakala	Pan-STARRS 1	·	2.9 km	MPC · JPL
599591	2010 PJ_{88}	—	July 23, 2015	Haleakala	Pan-STARRS 1	EOS	1.5 km	MPC · JPL
599592	2010 PR_{91}	—	August 10, 2010	Kitt Peak	Spacewatch	·	560 m	MPC · JPL
599593	2010 RK_{3}	—	September 1, 2010	Socorro	LINEAR	H	420 m	MPC · JPL
599594	2010 RX_{7}	—	September 19, 2003	Kitt Peak	Spacewatch	·	680 m	MPC · JPL
599595	2010 RQ_{9}	—	September 3, 2010	Mount Lemmon	Mount Lemmon Survey	·	680 m	MPC · JPL
599596	2010 RB_{11}	—	September 2, 2010	Mount Lemmon	Mount Lemmon Survey	·	1.7 km	MPC · JPL
599597	2010 RS_{18}	—	August 13, 2010	Kitt Peak	Spacewatch	·	640 m	MPC · JPL
599598	2010 RJ_{19}	—	December 30, 2007	Kitt Peak	Spacewatch	EUN	960 m	MPC · JPL
599599	2010 RK_{24}	—	August 12, 2010	Kitt Peak	Spacewatch	·	1.6 km	MPC · JPL
599600	2010 RT_{26}	—	September 3, 2010	Sierra Stars	R. Matson	·	2.0 km	MPC · JPL

== 599601–599700 ==
back to top

Designation			Discovery			Properties		Ref
Permanent	Provisional	Named after	Date	Site	Discoverer(s)	Category	Diam.	Ref
599601	2010 RW_{28}	—	September 4, 2010	Mount Lemmon	Mount Lemmon Survey	·	610 m	MPC · JPL
599602	2010 RJ_{34}	—	September 2, 2010	Mount Lemmon	Mount Lemmon Survey	·	1.6 km	MPC · JPL
599603	2010 RD_{39}	—	January 13, 2016	Haleakala	Pan-STARRS 1	·	1.1 km	MPC · JPL
599604	2010 RM_{47}	—	September 4, 2010	Kitt Peak	Spacewatch	·	1.7 km	MPC · JPL
599605	2010 RT_{50}	—	September 4, 2010	Kitt Peak	Spacewatch	EOS	1.2 km	MPC · JPL
599606	2010 RC_{58}	—	November 7, 2007	Kitt Peak	Spacewatch	·	590 m	MPC · JPL
599607	2010 RL_{60}	—	October 19, 2003	Kitt Peak	Spacewatch	·	830 m	MPC · JPL
599608	2010 RX_{61}	—	September 6, 2010	Kitt Peak	Spacewatch	3:2	5.2 km	MPC · JPL
599609	2010 RR_{63}	—	September 6, 2010	La Sagra	OAM	·	640 m	MPC · JPL
599610	2010 RC_{69}	—	November 13, 2007	Kitt Peak	Spacewatch	V	570 m	MPC · JPL
599611	2010 RJ_{89}	—	September 11, 2010	Mount Lemmon	Mount Lemmon Survey	·	720 m	MPC · JPL
599612	2010 RH_{91}	—	September 10, 2010	Kitt Peak	Spacewatch	·	730 m	MPC · JPL
599613	2010 RF_{92}	—	September 10, 2010	Mount Lemmon	Mount Lemmon Survey	EOS	1.6 km	MPC · JPL
599614	2010 RK_{92}	—	September 11, 2010	Mount Lemmon	Mount Lemmon Survey	·	1.9 km	MPC · JPL
599615	2010 RY_{94}	—	September 12, 2010	Mount Lemmon	Mount Lemmon Survey	EOS	1.7 km	MPC · JPL
599616	2010 RX_{95}	—	September 12, 2010	Mount Lemmon	Mount Lemmon Survey	EOS	1.6 km	MPC · JPL
599617	2010 RG_{96}	—	September 12, 2010	Mount Lemmon	Mount Lemmon Survey	EOS	1.3 km	MPC · JPL
599618	2010 RY_{96}	—	August 25, 2005	Palomar	NEAT	·	2.2 km	MPC · JPL
599619	2010 RC_{98}	—	September 19, 2003	Kitt Peak	Spacewatch	·	760 m	MPC · JPL
599620	2010 RT_{98}	—	February 8, 2007	Mount Lemmon	Mount Lemmon Survey	EOS	1.6 km	MPC · JPL
599621	2010 RA_{103}	—	September 10, 2010	Kitt Peak	Spacewatch	EOS	1.3 km	MPC · JPL
599622	2010 RU_{109}	—	September 2, 2010	Mount Lemmon	Mount Lemmon Survey	·	770 m	MPC · JPL
599623	2010 RJ_{114}	—	September 11, 2010	Kitt Peak	Spacewatch	H	510 m	MPC · JPL
599624	2010 RL_{115}	—	October 28, 2005	Mount Lemmon	Mount Lemmon Survey	·	1.4 km	MPC · JPL
599625	2010 RS_{118}	—	September 11, 2010	Kitt Peak	Spacewatch	EOS	1.6 km	MPC · JPL
599626	2010 RB_{122}	—	September 14, 2010	Mount Lemmon	Mount Lemmon Survey	·	1.6 km	MPC · JPL
599627	2010 RQ_{132}	—	October 9, 2005	Kitt Peak	Spacewatch	EOS	1.5 km	MPC · JPL
599628	2010 RY_{132}	—	September 15, 2010	Mount Lemmon	Mount Lemmon Survey	·	2.1 km	MPC · JPL
599629	2010 RG_{138}	—	September 10, 2010	Mount Lemmon	Mount Lemmon Survey	·	1.2 km	MPC · JPL
599630	2010 RF_{148}	—	September 15, 2010	Kitt Peak	Spacewatch	·	1.6 km	MPC · JPL
599631	2010 RQ_{150}	—	October 10, 2007	Kitt Peak	Spacewatch	·	630 m	MPC · JPL
599632	2010 RC_{156}	—	September 15, 2010	Kitt Peak	Spacewatch	EOS	1.2 km	MPC · JPL
599633	2010 RR_{163}	—	September 5, 2010	Mount Lemmon	Mount Lemmon Survey	H	380 m	MPC · JPL
599634	2010 RQ_{185}	—	October 4, 2005	Mount Lemmon	Mount Lemmon Survey	·	2.0 km	MPC · JPL
599635	2010 RZ_{185}	—	August 21, 2015	Haleakala	Pan-STARRS 1	·	1.6 km	MPC · JPL
599636	2010 RY_{189}	—	September 14, 2010	Kitt Peak	Spacewatch	·	860 m	MPC · JPL
599637	2010 RF_{191}	—	November 21, 2014	Haleakala	Pan-STARRS 1	·	670 m	MPC · JPL
599638	2010 RG_{191}	—	June 4, 2014	Haleakala	Pan-STARRS 1	EOS	1.7 km	MPC · JPL
599639	2010 RT_{193}	—	February 16, 2013	Mount Lemmon	Mount Lemmon Survey	·	1.5 km	MPC · JPL
599640	2010 RU_{195}	—	January 8, 2016	Haleakala	Pan-STARRS 1	·	730 m	MPC · JPL
599641	2010 RE_{199}	—	March 5, 2013	Haleakala	Pan-STARRS 1	EMA	2.6 km	MPC · JPL
599642	2010 RF_{199}	—	February 15, 2013	Haleakala	Pan-STARRS 1	·	2.0 km	MPC · JPL
599643	2010 RW_{201}	—	September 15, 2010	Mount Lemmon	Mount Lemmon Survey	·	1.6 km	MPC · JPL
599644	2010 RS_{202}	—	January 16, 2018	Haleakala	Pan-STARRS 1	·	1.6 km	MPC · JPL
599645	2010 RF_{205}	—	June 27, 2015	Haleakala	Pan-STARRS 1	·	1.6 km	MPC · JPL
599646	2010 RU_{214}	—	September 12, 2010	Kitt Peak	Spacewatch	·	1.6 km	MPC · JPL
599647	2010 SQ_{2}	—	March 11, 2002	Palomar	NEAT	·	3.5 km	MPC · JPL
599648	2010 SW_{8}	—	September 17, 2010	Kitt Peak	Spacewatch	·	840 m	MPC · JPL
599649	2010 SA_{10}	—	September 17, 2010	Mount Lemmon	Mount Lemmon Survey	·	600 m	MPC · JPL
599650	2010 SS_{11}	—	September 16, 2010	Bisei	BATTeRS	·	910 m	MPC · JPL
599651	2010 SG_{19}	—	March 1, 2009	Mount Lemmon	Mount Lemmon Survey	H	400 m	MPC · JPL
599652	2010 SX_{24}	—	September 29, 2010	Mount Lemmon	Mount Lemmon Survey	PHO	1.0 km	MPC · JPL
599653	2010 SB_{30}	—	October 1, 2005	Kitt Peak	Spacewatch	EOS	1.5 km	MPC · JPL
599654	2010 SN_{31}	—	January 10, 2007	Kitt Peak	Spacewatch	·	3.0 km	MPC · JPL
599655	2010 SE_{40}	—	October 1, 2005	Mount Lemmon	Mount Lemmon Survey	·	2.5 km	MPC · JPL
599656	2010 SX_{44}	—	September 16, 2010	Kitt Peak	Spacewatch	·	2.3 km	MPC · JPL
599657	2010 SC_{45}	—	September 30, 2010	Mount Lemmon	Mount Lemmon Survey	·	2.3 km	MPC · JPL
599658	2010 SJ_{46}	—	September 18, 2010	Mount Lemmon	Mount Lemmon Survey	·	830 m	MPC · JPL
599659	2010 SC_{48}	—	September 18, 2010	Mount Lemmon	Mount Lemmon Survey	(1118)	3.3 km	MPC · JPL
599660	2010 SP_{49}	—	September 18, 2010	Kitt Peak	Spacewatch	·	630 m	MPC · JPL
599661	2010 SZ_{49}	—	May 7, 2014	Haleakala	Pan-STARRS 1	·	1.8 km	MPC · JPL
599662	2010 SH_{52}	—	September 18, 2010	Mount Lemmon	Mount Lemmon Survey	EOS	1.5 km	MPC · JPL
599663	2010 SL_{52}	—	December 30, 2011	Mount Lemmon	Mount Lemmon Survey	·	1.7 km	MPC · JPL
599664	2010 SV_{54}	—	September 29, 2010	Mount Lemmon	Mount Lemmon Survey	·	1.7 km	MPC · JPL
599665	2010 SC_{56}	—	September 30, 2010	Mount Lemmon	Mount Lemmon Survey	·	1.7 km	MPC · JPL
599666	2010 SO_{58}	—	September 18, 2010	Mount Lemmon	Mount Lemmon Survey	·	450 m	MPC · JPL
599667	2010 SD_{59}	—	September 18, 2010	Mount Lemmon	Mount Lemmon Survey	V	470 m	MPC · JPL
599668	2010 TU_{1}	—	October 1, 2010	Vail-Jarnac	Glinos, T.	·	1.0 km	MPC · JPL
599669	2010 TV_{9}	—	October 1, 2010	Kitt Peak	Spacewatch	EOS	1.3 km	MPC · JPL
599670	2010 TL_{12}	—	September 11, 2010	Kitt Peak	Spacewatch	·	1.3 km	MPC · JPL
599671	2010 TJ_{42}	—	October 7, 2005	Mount Lemmon	Mount Lemmon Survey	·	1.5 km	MPC · JPL
599672	2010 TT_{47}	—	April 29, 2008	Mount Lemmon	Mount Lemmon Survey	ELF	2.6 km	MPC · JPL
599673	2010 TD_{57}	—	October 3, 2010	Kitt Peak	Spacewatch	·	1.4 km	MPC · JPL
599674	2010 TS_{59}	—	October 7, 2010	Piszkés-tető	K. Sárneczky, Z. Kuli	·	1.2 km	MPC · JPL
599675	2010 TC_{60}	—	September 5, 2010	Ondřejov	Ondřejov, Observatoř	TIR	2.3 km	MPC · JPL
599676	2010 TL_{72}	—	September 28, 2010	Kitt Peak	Spacewatch	·	1.3 km	MPC · JPL
599677	2010 TH_{73}	—	March 21, 2009	Kitt Peak	Spacewatch	MAS	610 m	MPC · JPL
599678	2010 TQ_{73}	—	October 8, 2010	Kitt Peak	Spacewatch	·	850 m	MPC · JPL
599679	2010 TN_{77}	—	September 9, 2010	Kitt Peak	Spacewatch	·	750 m	MPC · JPL
599680	2010 TJ_{78}	—	October 8, 2010	Sandlot	G. Hug	V	510 m	MPC · JPL
599681	2010 TO_{84}	—	September 9, 2010	Charleston	R. Holmes	·	1.5 km	MPC · JPL
599682	2010 TC_{91}	—	October 1, 2010	Mount Lemmon	Mount Lemmon Survey	·	790 m	MPC · JPL
599683	2010 TV_{105}	—	November 15, 2003	Palomar	NEAT	·	1.0 km	MPC · JPL
599684	2010 TZ_{114}	—	March 11, 2005	Kitt Peak	Spacewatch	V	630 m	MPC · JPL
599685	2010 TX_{118}	—	October 9, 2010	Kitt Peak	Spacewatch	NYS	850 m	MPC · JPL
599686	2010 TP_{127}	—	October 10, 2010	Mount Lemmon	Mount Lemmon Survey	·	2.2 km	MPC · JPL
599687	2010 TQ_{130}	—	October 2, 2010	Kitt Peak	Spacewatch	·	1.4 km	MPC · JPL
599688	2010 TQ_{132}	—	October 11, 2010	Mount Lemmon	Mount Lemmon Survey	·	1.8 km	MPC · JPL
599689	2010 TD_{139}	—	December 25, 2005	Mount Lemmon	Mount Lemmon Survey	·	2.1 km	MPC · JPL
599690	2010 TG_{144}	—	October 11, 2010	Mount Lemmon	Mount Lemmon Survey	·	730 m	MPC · JPL
599691	2010 TL_{151}	—	October 9, 2010	Bergisch Gladbach	W. Bickel	NYS	990 m	MPC · JPL
599692	2010 TF_{152}	—	September 4, 2010	Kitt Peak	Spacewatch	·	1.9 km	MPC · JPL
599693	2010 TM_{159}	—	October 10, 2010	Mount Lemmon	Mount Lemmon Survey	EOS	1.4 km	MPC · JPL
599694	2010 TO_{161}	—	October 25, 2005	Mount Lemmon	Mount Lemmon Survey	EOS	1.4 km	MPC · JPL
599695	2010 TB_{164}	—	October 13, 2010	Mount Lemmon	Mount Lemmon Survey	·	2.3 km	MPC · JPL
599696	2010 TD_{177}	—	October 10, 2010	Mount Lemmon	Mount Lemmon Survey	·	940 m	MPC · JPL
599697	2010 TB_{183}	—	July 14, 2013	Haleakala	Pan-STARRS 1	·	510 m	MPC · JPL
599698	2010 TW_{192}	—	October 12, 2010	Mount Lemmon	Mount Lemmon Survey	L4 · ERY	6.6 km	MPC · JPL
599699	2010 TH_{193}	—	October 1, 2010	Mount Lemmon	Mount Lemmon Survey	·	1.4 km	MPC · JPL
599700	2010 TK_{195}	—	October 12, 2010	Mount Lemmon	Mount Lemmon Survey	MAS	590 m	MPC · JPL

== 599701–599800 ==
back to top

Designation			Discovery			Properties		Ref
Permanent	Provisional	Named after	Date	Site	Discoverer(s)	Category	Diam.	Ref
599701	2010 TL_{195}	—	October 12, 2010	Mount Lemmon	Mount Lemmon Survey	·	2.1 km	MPC · JPL
599702	2010 TB_{197}	—	November 24, 2011	Mount Lemmon	Mount Lemmon Survey	LIX	3.0 km	MPC · JPL
599703	2010 TM_{197}	—	October 12, 2010	Mount Lemmon	Mount Lemmon Survey	MAS	640 m	MPC · JPL
599704	2010 TP_{200}	—	October 12, 2010	Mount Lemmon	Mount Lemmon Survey	·	770 m	MPC · JPL
599705	2010 TD_{202}	—	October 10, 2010	Kitt Peak	Spacewatch	·	1.4 km	MPC · JPL
599706	2010 TH_{205}	—	November 25, 2005	Kitt Peak	Spacewatch	·	1.9 km	MPC · JPL
599707	2010 TK_{207}	—	June 18, 2013	Haleakala	Pan-STARRS 1	·	910 m	MPC · JPL
599708	2010 TQ_{210}	—	May 7, 2014	Haleakala	Pan-STARRS 1	·	1.2 km	MPC · JPL
599709	2010 TQ_{212}	—	October 13, 2010	Mount Lemmon	Mount Lemmon Survey	H	400 m	MPC · JPL
599710	2010 TP_{213}	—	October 1, 2010	Mount Lemmon	Mount Lemmon Survey	·	770 m	MPC · JPL
599711	2010 TQ_{218}	—	October 13, 2010	Mount Lemmon	Mount Lemmon Survey	·	2.5 km	MPC · JPL
599712	2010 TG_{227}	—	August 22, 1995	Kitt Peak	Spacewatch	·	840 m	MPC · JPL
599713	2010 TR_{227}	—	October 2, 2010	Kitt Peak	Spacewatch	·	780 m	MPC · JPL
599714	2010 TC_{228}	—	October 13, 2010	Mount Lemmon	Mount Lemmon Survey	·	2.6 km	MPC · JPL
599715	2010 UN	—	September 16, 2003	Kitt Peak	Spacewatch	·	560 m	MPC · JPL
599716	2010 UE_{3}	—	October 17, 2010	Mount Lemmon	Mount Lemmon Survey	·	2.4 km	MPC · JPL
599717	2010 UP_{5}	—	October 17, 2010	Kitt Peak	Spacewatch	·	1.9 km	MPC · JPL
599718	2010 UD_{17}	—	September 17, 2010	Mount Lemmon	Mount Lemmon Survey	·	770 m	MPC · JPL
599719	2010 UK_{19}	—	October 28, 2010	Mount Lemmon	Mount Lemmon Survey	V	540 m	MPC · JPL
599720	2010 US_{20}	—	September 25, 2005	Kitt Peak	Spacewatch	BRA	1.1 km	MPC · JPL
599721	2010 UZ_{21}	—	December 14, 2003	Kitt Peak	Spacewatch	·	820 m	MPC · JPL
599722	2010 UJ_{29}	—	October 28, 2010	Piszkés-tető	K. Sárneczky, Z. Kuli	·	2.6 km	MPC · JPL
599723	2010 UU_{49}	—	October 12, 2010	Mount Lemmon	Mount Lemmon Survey	·	760 m	MPC · JPL
599724	2010 UP_{62}	—	October 30, 2010	Mount Lemmon	Mount Lemmon Survey	·	1.7 km	MPC · JPL
599725	2010 UG_{64}	—	October 31, 2010	Piszkés-tető	K. Sárneczky, S. Kürti	·	3.0 km	MPC · JPL
599726	2010 UC_{71}	—	September 15, 2010	Charleston	R. Holmes	·	730 m	MPC · JPL
599727	2010 UG_{77}	—	October 30, 2010	Mount Lemmon	Mount Lemmon Survey	H	310 m	MPC · JPL
599728	2010 UV_{79}	—	September 20, 2009	Kitt Peak	Spacewatch	L4	7.0 km	MPC · JPL
599729	2010 UK_{84}	—	October 9, 2010	Mount Lemmon	Mount Lemmon Survey	V	530 m	MPC · JPL
599730	2010 UE_{86}	—	October 19, 2010	Mount Lemmon	Mount Lemmon Survey	·	2.3 km	MPC · JPL
599731	2010 UM_{90}	—	October 31, 2010	Mount Lemmon	Mount Lemmon Survey	·	980 m	MPC · JPL
599732	2010 UW_{93}	—	October 13, 2010	Mount Lemmon	Mount Lemmon Survey	V	480 m	MPC · JPL
599733	2010 UC_{97}	—	October 12, 2010	Mount Lemmon	Mount Lemmon Survey	·	840 m	MPC · JPL
599734	2010 US_{108}	—	October 17, 2010	Mount Lemmon	Mount Lemmon Survey	·	2.5 km	MPC · JPL
599735	2010 UY_{108}	—	October 17, 2010	Mount Lemmon	Mount Lemmon Survey	·	2.3 km	MPC · JPL
599736	2010 UA_{110}	—	July 24, 2003	Palomar	NEAT	·	610 m	MPC · JPL
599737	2010 UN_{110}	—	October 28, 2010	Mount Lemmon	Mount Lemmon Survey	·	1.0 km	MPC · JPL
599738	2010 UC_{117}	—	June 19, 2006	Mount Lemmon	Mount Lemmon Survey	·	690 m	MPC · JPL
599739	2010 UD_{118}	—	January 12, 2018	Haleakala	Pan-STARRS 1	·	2.0 km	MPC · JPL
599740	2010 UA_{121}	—	October 29, 2010	Piszkés-tető	K. Sárneczky, Z. Kuli	V	390 m	MPC · JPL
599741	2010 US_{122}	—	October 17, 2010	Mount Lemmon	Mount Lemmon Survey	L4	7.4 km	MPC · JPL
599742	2010 UE_{125}	—	October 31, 2010	Mount Lemmon	Mount Lemmon Survey	KOR	1.1 km	MPC · JPL
599743	2010 UD_{129}	—	October 30, 2010	Mount Lemmon	Mount Lemmon Survey	·	790 m	MPC · JPL
599744	2010 UE_{129}	—	October 31, 2010	Mount Lemmon	Mount Lemmon Survey	·	2.1 km	MPC · JPL
599745	2010 UJ_{129}	—	October 17, 2010	Mount Lemmon	Mount Lemmon Survey	·	2.5 km	MPC · JPL
599746	2010 VY_{3}	—	November 1, 2010	Mount Lemmon	Mount Lemmon Survey	·	2.3 km	MPC · JPL
599747	2010 VJ_{5}	—	November 1, 2010	Mount Lemmon	Mount Lemmon Survey	·	490 m	MPC · JPL
599748	2010 VQ_{5}	—	September 11, 2004	Kitt Peak	Spacewatch	·	1.9 km	MPC · JPL
599749	2010 VW_{5}	—	November 1, 2010	Mount Lemmon	Mount Lemmon Survey	·	690 m	MPC · JPL
599750	2010 VB_{8}	—	November 1, 2010	Mount Lemmon	Mount Lemmon Survey	·	1.6 km	MPC · JPL
599751	2010 VY_{10}	—	November 1, 2010	Mount Lemmon	Mount Lemmon Survey	·	950 m	MPC · JPL
599752	2010 VQ_{11}	—	November 2, 2010	La Silla	La Silla	cubewano (hot)	367 km	MPC · JPL
599753	2010 VY_{14}	—	October 14, 2010	Mount Lemmon	Mount Lemmon Survey	H	510 m	MPC · JPL
599754	2010 VD_{21}	—	November 3, 2010	Haleakala	Pan-STARRS 1	H	240 m	MPC · JPL
599755 Alcarràs	2010 VL_{21}	Alcarràs	November 4, 2010	SM Montmagastrell	Bosch, J. M.	·	2.3 km	MPC · JPL
599756	2010 VZ_{22}	—	November 1, 2010	Mount Lemmon	Mount Lemmon Survey	VER	1.9 km	MPC · JPL
599757	2010 VL_{43}	—	October 17, 2010	Mount Lemmon	Mount Lemmon Survey	EOS	1.5 km	MPC · JPL
599758	2010 VQ_{44}	—	November 1, 2010	Mount Lemmon	Mount Lemmon Survey	EOS	1.4 km	MPC · JPL
599759	2010 VP_{53}	—	August 26, 2003	Cerro Tololo	Deep Ecliptic Survey	·	720 m	MPC · JPL
599760	2010 VP_{59}	—	November 4, 2010	Mount Lemmon	Mount Lemmon Survey	·	2.6 km	MPC · JPL
599761	2010 VW_{63}	—	November 6, 2010	Mount Lemmon	Mount Lemmon Survey	·	2.4 km	MPC · JPL
599762	2010 VJ_{66}	—	May 7, 2006	Mount Lemmon	Mount Lemmon Survey	·	670 m	MPC · JPL
599763	2010 VM_{72}	—	October 28, 2010	Catalina	CSS	·	540 m	MPC · JPL
599764	2010 VK_{79}	—	November 3, 2010	Mount Lemmon	Mount Lemmon Survey	·	530 m	MPC · JPL
599765	2010 VG_{81}	—	August 27, 2006	Kitt Peak	Spacewatch	NYS	980 m	MPC · JPL
599766	2010 VL_{90}	—	October 22, 2005	Kitt Peak	Spacewatch	EOS	1.9 km	MPC · JPL
599767	2010 VM_{95}	—	July 21, 2006	Mount Lemmon	Mount Lemmon Survey	MAS	550 m	MPC · JPL
599768	2010 VS_{95}	—	July 25, 2006	Mount Lemmon	Mount Lemmon Survey	MAS	610 m	MPC · JPL
599769	2010 VB_{102}	—	November 5, 2010	Kitt Peak	Spacewatch	L4	8.1 km	MPC · JPL
599770	2010 VJ_{111}	—	October 17, 2010	Mount Lemmon	Mount Lemmon Survey	L4	6.8 km	MPC · JPL
599771	2010 VU_{122}	—	February 12, 2008	Mount Lemmon	Mount Lemmon Survey	·	660 m	MPC · JPL
599772	2010 VY_{128}	—	November 9, 2010	Catalina	CSS	PHO	780 m	MPC · JPL
599773	2010 VK_{134}	—	February 7, 2008	Kitt Peak	Spacewatch	·	980 m	MPC · JPL
599774	2010 VN_{134}	—	October 1, 2006	Kitt Peak	Spacewatch	·	960 m	MPC · JPL
599775	2010 VW_{141}	—	November 6, 2010	Mount Lemmon	Mount Lemmon Survey	L4	6.4 km	MPC · JPL
599776	2010 VY_{148}	—	November 6, 2010	Mount Lemmon	Mount Lemmon Survey	·	1.8 km	MPC · JPL
599777	2010 VV_{151}	—	November 6, 2010	Mount Lemmon	Mount Lemmon Survey	·	2.3 km	MPC · JPL
599778	2010 VZ_{154}	—	March 3, 2016	Haleakala	Pan-STARRS 1	PHO	590 m	MPC · JPL
599779	2010 VW_{156}	—	November 8, 2010	Kitt Peak	Spacewatch	L4 · HEK	8.4 km	MPC · JPL
599780	2010 VC_{164}	—	September 20, 2009	Kitt Peak	Spacewatch	L4	6.2 km	MPC · JPL
599781	2010 VN_{167}	—	November 10, 2010	Mount Lemmon	Mount Lemmon Survey	·	2.8 km	MPC · JPL
599782	2010 VM_{171}	—	September 17, 2009	Kitt Peak	Spacewatch	L4	5.3 km	MPC · JPL
599783	2010 VC_{180}	—	November 23, 2006	Kitt Peak	Spacewatch	·	960 m	MPC · JPL
599784	2010 VN_{180}	—	November 11, 2010	Mount Lemmon	Mount Lemmon Survey	·	2.5 km	MPC · JPL
599785	2010 VF_{186}	—	November 13, 2010	Mount Lemmon	Mount Lemmon Survey	·	2.3 km	MPC · JPL
599786	2010 VH_{190}	—	November 13, 2010	Mount Lemmon	Mount Lemmon Survey	·	680 m	MPC · JPL
599787	2010 VO_{190}	—	November 13, 2010	Mount Lemmon	Mount Lemmon Survey	L4	6.8 km	MPC · JPL
599788	2010 VG_{208}	—	October 11, 2010	Mount Lemmon	Mount Lemmon Survey	·	2.9 km	MPC · JPL
599789	2010 VS_{208}	—	October 17, 2010	Mount Lemmon	Mount Lemmon Survey	·	2.7 km	MPC · JPL
599790	2010 VU_{217}	—	November 11, 2010	Catalina	CSS	·	2.6 km	MPC · JPL
599791	2010 VQ_{228}	—	November 1, 2010	Mount Lemmon	Mount Lemmon Survey	ELF	2.8 km	MPC · JPL
599792	2010 VC_{230}	—	November 4, 2010	Mount Lemmon	Mount Lemmon Survey	·	2.1 km	MPC · JPL
599793	2010 VO_{230}	—	November 13, 2010	Mount Lemmon	Mount Lemmon Survey	·	840 m	MPC · JPL
599794	2010 VW_{233}	—	June 18, 2013	Haleakala	Pan-STARRS 1	·	630 m	MPC · JPL
599795	2010 VY_{234}	—	September 11, 2015	Haleakala	Pan-STARRS 1	·	2.1 km	MPC · JPL
599796	2010 VG_{236}	—	March 2, 2016	Haleakala	Pan-STARRS 1	·	990 m	MPC · JPL
599797	2010 VG_{239}	—	June 3, 2014	Haleakala	Pan-STARRS 1	·	1.4 km	MPC · JPL
599798	2010 VT_{239}	—	November 10, 2010	Mount Lemmon	Mount Lemmon Survey	ELF	3.2 km	MPC · JPL
599799	2010 VK_{241}	—	November 26, 2014	Haleakala	Pan-STARRS 1	·	910 m	MPC · JPL
599800	2010 VL_{241}	—	March 8, 2018	Haleakala	Pan-STARRS 1	·	2.7 km	MPC · JPL

== 599801–599900 ==
back to top

Designation			Discovery			Properties		Ref
Permanent	Provisional	Named after	Date	Site	Discoverer(s)	Category	Diam.	Ref
599801	2010 VW_{241}	—	January 20, 2018	Mount Lemmon	Mount Lemmon Survey	·	2.5 km	MPC · JPL
599802	2010 VJ_{242}	—	December 5, 2015	Haleakala	Pan-STARRS 1	·	3.2 km	MPC · JPL
599803	2010 VO_{244}	—	November 12, 2010	Mount Lemmon	Mount Lemmon Survey	·	2.3 km	MPC · JPL
599804	2010 VR_{244}	—	November 13, 2010	Mount Lemmon	Mount Lemmon Survey	·	2.5 km	MPC · JPL
599805	2010 VJ_{245}	—	November 6, 2010	Mount Lemmon	Mount Lemmon Survey	·	2.2 km	MPC · JPL
599806	2010 VQ_{245}	—	November 3, 2010	Mount Lemmon	Mount Lemmon Survey	·	2.5 km	MPC · JPL
599807	2010 VS_{245}	—	November 3, 2010	Kitt Peak	Spacewatch	L4	7.5 km	MPC · JPL
599808	2010 VV_{245}	—	November 13, 2010	Mount Lemmon	Mount Lemmon Survey	L4	6.7 km	MPC · JPL
599809	2010 VN_{247}	—	November 12, 2010	Mount Lemmon	Mount Lemmon Survey	L4	7.0 km	MPC · JPL
599810	2010 VT_{247}	—	November 10, 2010	Mount Lemmon	Mount Lemmon Survey	·	2.7 km	MPC · JPL
599811	2010 VT_{249}	—	November 10, 2010	Mount Lemmon	Mount Lemmon Survey	·	1.6 km	MPC · JPL
599812	2010 VW_{249}	—	November 10, 2010	Mount Lemmon	Mount Lemmon Survey	L4 · ERY	6.5 km	MPC · JPL
599813	2010 VC_{251}	—	November 12, 2010	Mount Lemmon	Mount Lemmon Survey	L4 · ERY	7.3 km	MPC · JPL
599814	2010 VJ_{251}	—	November 6, 2010	Mount Lemmon	Mount Lemmon Survey	·	2.0 km	MPC · JPL
599815	2010 VJ_{253}	—	November 11, 2010	Mount Lemmon	Mount Lemmon Survey	·	2.5 km	MPC · JPL
599816	2010 VB_{254}	—	November 3, 2010	Mount Lemmon	Mount Lemmon Survey	·	2.3 km	MPC · JPL
599817	2010 VZ_{254}	—	January 24, 2001	Kitt Peak	Spacewatch	·	2.5 km	MPC · JPL
599818	2010 VW_{256}	—	November 3, 2010	Kitt Peak	Spacewatch	·	2.6 km	MPC · JPL
599819	2010 VE_{257}	—	November 2, 2010	Mount Lemmon	Mount Lemmon Survey	·	1.2 km	MPC · JPL
599820	2010 VG_{257}	—	November 10, 2010	Mount Lemmon	Mount Lemmon Survey	·	2.1 km	MPC · JPL
599821	2010 VR_{258}	—	November 2, 2010	Mount Lemmon	Mount Lemmon Survey	L4 · ERY	6.8 km	MPC · JPL
599822	2010 VM_{259}	—	November 8, 2010	Mount Lemmon	Mount Lemmon Survey	L4	7.4 km	MPC · JPL
599823	2010 VX_{262}	—	November 6, 2010	Mount Lemmon	Mount Lemmon Survey	L4	6.3 km	MPC · JPL
599824	2010 VY_{262}	—	November 1, 2010	Kitt Peak	Spacewatch	L4	7.3 km	MPC · JPL
599825	2010 VQ_{263}	—	November 1, 2010	Mount Lemmon	Mount Lemmon Survey	L4	7.7 km	MPC · JPL
599826	2010 VP_{266}	—	November 10, 2010	Mount Lemmon	Mount Lemmon Survey	·	450 m	MPC · JPL
599827	2010 VR_{269}	—	November 1, 2010	Mount Lemmon	Mount Lemmon Survey	AGN	800 m	MPC · JPL
599828	2010 VB_{270}	—	November 2, 2010	Mount Lemmon	Mount Lemmon Survey	·	2.6 km	MPC · JPL
599829	2010 WR_{3}	—	January 7, 2006	Mount Lemmon	Mount Lemmon Survey	THM	1.5 km	MPC · JPL
599830	2010 WR_{9}	—	December 18, 2003	Kitt Peak	Spacewatch	·	1.3 km	MPC · JPL
599831	2010 WJ_{10}	—	November 25, 2010	Mount Lemmon	Mount Lemmon Survey	EOS	1.6 km	MPC · JPL
599832	2010 WC_{18}	—	November 27, 2010	Mount Lemmon	Mount Lemmon Survey	·	1.1 km	MPC · JPL
599833	2010 WK_{20}	—	April 14, 2008	Mount Lemmon	Mount Lemmon Survey	NYS	890 m	MPC · JPL
599834	2010 WM_{28}	—	November 27, 2010	Mount Lemmon	Mount Lemmon Survey	EOS	1.8 km	MPC · JPL
599835	2010 WZ_{32}	—	November 27, 2010	Mount Lemmon	Mount Lemmon Survey	·	780 m	MPC · JPL
599836	2010 WH_{36}	—	November 27, 2010	Mount Lemmon	Mount Lemmon Survey	VER	2.3 km	MPC · JPL
599837	2010 WX_{47}	—	November 6, 2005	Mount Lemmon	Mount Lemmon Survey	AST	1.8 km	MPC · JPL
599838	2010 WZ_{57}	—	November 1, 2010	Kitt Peak	Spacewatch	·	550 m	MPC · JPL
599839	2010 WJ_{58}	—	November 10, 2010	Mount Lemmon	Mount Lemmon Survey	·	540 m	MPC · JPL
599840	2010 WZ_{58}	—	January 31, 2006	Kitt Peak	Spacewatch	THM	2.0 km	MPC · JPL
599841	2010 WS_{63}	—	November 2, 2010	Kitt Peak	Spacewatch	·	960 m	MPC · JPL
599842	2010 WK_{68}	—	November 30, 2010	Mount Lemmon	Mount Lemmon Survey	V	470 m	MPC · JPL
599843	2010 WT_{75}	—	November 7, 2010	Kitt Peak	Spacewatch	·	810 m	MPC · JPL
599844	2010 XE_{6}	—	August 1, 2009	Kitt Peak	Spacewatch	·	2.2 km	MPC · JPL
599845	2010 XZ_{15}	—	December 2, 2010	Mount Lemmon	Mount Lemmon Survey	·	1.4 km	MPC · JPL
599846	2010 XU_{16}	—	December 2, 2010	Mount Lemmon	Mount Lemmon Survey	·	1.0 km	MPC · JPL
599847	2010 XX_{20}	—	December 6, 2010	Mount Lemmon	Mount Lemmon Survey	H	300 m	MPC · JPL
599848	2010 XS_{23}	—	December 1, 2002	Eskridge	G. Hug	H	580 m	MPC · JPL
599849	2010 XH_{31}	—	December 2, 2010	Mount Lemmon	Mount Lemmon Survey	L4	6.4 km	MPC · JPL
599850	2010 XY_{33}	—	October 23, 2006	Kitt Peak	Spacewatch	·	930 m	MPC · JPL
599851	2010 XY_{37}	—	December 3, 2010	Kitt Peak	Spacewatch	·	1.6 km	MPC · JPL
599852	2010 XR_{40}	—	December 4, 2010	Piszkés-tető	K. Sárneczky, Z. Kuli	LIX	2.6 km	MPC · JPL
599853	2010 XT_{44}	—	November 3, 2010	Kitt Peak	Spacewatch	·	4.0 km	MPC · JPL
599854	2010 XC_{48}	—	November 2, 2010	Mount Lemmon	Mount Lemmon Survey	·	2.5 km	MPC · JPL
599855	2010 XH_{48}	—	December 6, 2010	Kitt Peak	Spacewatch	·	2.1 km	MPC · JPL
599856	2010 XF_{57}	—	December 17, 2007	Mount Lemmon	Mount Lemmon Survey	·	540 m	MPC · JPL
599857	2010 XL_{58}	—	August 18, 2006	Palomar	NEAT	·	870 m	MPC · JPL
599858	2010 XF_{67}	—	December 13, 2010	Calvin-Rehoboth	L. A. Molnar	TIR	2.3 km	MPC · JPL
599859	2010 XD_{73}	—	December 1, 2010	Mount Lemmon	Mount Lemmon Survey	·	3.1 km	MPC · JPL
599860	2010 XQ_{80}	—	October 7, 2004	Palomar	NEAT	TIR	2.8 km	MPC · JPL
599861	2010 XM_{91}	—	March 22, 2014	Mount Lemmon	Mount Lemmon Survey	L4	7.4 km	MPC · JPL
599862	2010 XT_{93}	—	November 11, 2010	Mount Lemmon	Mount Lemmon Survey	VER	2.3 km	MPC · JPL
599863	2010 XP_{94}	—	February 12, 2015	Haleakala	Pan-STARRS 1	·	1 km	MPC · JPL
599864	2010 XB_{102}	—	October 2, 2015	Mount Lemmon	Mount Lemmon Survey	·	2.4 km	MPC · JPL
599865	2010 XZ_{105}	—	February 10, 2013	Haleakala	Pan-STARRS 1	L4	6.5 km	MPC · JPL
599866	2010 XD_{111}	—	December 14, 2010	Mount Lemmon	Mount Lemmon Survey	·	2.4 km	MPC · JPL
599867	2010 XL_{111}	—	December 9, 2010	Kitt Peak	Spacewatch	ELF	2.9 km	MPC · JPL
599868	2010 XW_{112}	—	December 3, 2010	Mount Lemmon	Mount Lemmon Survey	·	3.1 km	MPC · JPL
599869	2010 XX_{113}	—	December 10, 2010	Mount Lemmon	Mount Lemmon Survey	·	2.7 km	MPC · JPL
599870	2010 XD_{114}	—	December 4, 2010	Mount Lemmon	Mount Lemmon Survey	EOS	1.4 km	MPC · JPL
599871	2010 XM_{116}	—	December 13, 2010	Mount Lemmon	Mount Lemmon Survey	·	3.4 km	MPC · JPL
599872	2010 XY_{116}	—	December 4, 2010	Mount Lemmon	Mount Lemmon Survey	·	960 m	MPC · JPL
599873	2010 YZ_{3}	—	November 12, 2010	Kitt Peak	Spacewatch	·	930 m	MPC · JPL
599874	2010 YW_{5}	—	December 25, 2010	Mount Lemmon	Mount Lemmon Survey	·	1.1 km	MPC · JPL
599875	2011 AA_{5}	—	December 25, 2010	Mount Lemmon	Mount Lemmon Survey	·	2.6 km	MPC · JPL
599876	2011 AS_{5}	—	January 6, 2011	Haleakala	Pan-STARRS 1	H	440 m	MPC · JPL
599877	2011 AM_{7}	—	December 10, 2010	Kitt Peak	Spacewatch	·	3.3 km	MPC · JPL
599878	2011 AR_{7}	—	January 2, 2011	Mount Lemmon	Mount Lemmon Survey	·	2.8 km	MPC · JPL
599879	2011 AG_{18}	—	November 8, 2010	Mount Lemmon	Mount Lemmon Survey	L4	7.4 km	MPC · JPL
599880	2011 AC_{19}	—	January 28, 2006	Mount Lemmon	Mount Lemmon Survey	EOS	1.5 km	MPC · JPL
599881	2011 AX_{20}	—	January 9, 2011	Mount Lemmon	Mount Lemmon Survey	THM	2.2 km	MPC · JPL
599882	2011 AC_{26}	—	January 31, 2006	Catalina	CSS	TIR	2.9 km	MPC · JPL
599883	2011 AG_{28}	—	January 10, 2011	Kitt Peak	Spacewatch	T_{j} (2.99)	3.5 km	MPC · JPL
599884	2011 AJ_{30}	—	January 9, 2011	Kitt Peak	Spacewatch	TIR	2.5 km	MPC · JPL
599885	2011 AQ_{39}	—	January 10, 2011	Mount Lemmon	Mount Lemmon Survey	NYS	790 m	MPC · JPL
599886	2011 AO_{49}	—	January 27, 2004	Kitt Peak	Spacewatch	·	860 m	MPC · JPL
599887	2011 AQ_{57}	—	January 11, 2011	Mount Lemmon	Mount Lemmon Survey	NYS	790 m	MPC · JPL
599888	2011 AE_{69}	—	January 11, 2011	Catalina	CSS	·	1.2 km	MPC · JPL
599889	2011 AZ_{75}	—	January 8, 2011	Catalina	CSS	·	1.5 km	MPC · JPL
599890	2011 AT_{78}	—	January 14, 2011	Mount Lemmon	Mount Lemmon Survey	·	2.5 km	MPC · JPL
599891	2011 AV_{83}	—	March 30, 2008	Kitt Peak	Spacewatch	·	810 m	MPC · JPL
599892	2011 AB_{84}	—	January 10, 2011	Mount Lemmon	Mount Lemmon Survey	·	1.2 km	MPC · JPL
599893	2011 AC_{84}	—	July 26, 2015	Haleakala	Pan-STARRS 1	·	3.5 km	MPC · JPL
599894	2011 AZ_{85}	—	November 1, 2015	Mount Lemmon	Mount Lemmon Survey	·	2.4 km	MPC · JPL
599895	2011 AJ_{86}	—	February 3, 2012	Haleakala	Pan-STARRS 1	L4	8.3 km	MPC · JPL
599896	2011 AA_{87}	—	January 13, 2011	Mount Lemmon	Mount Lemmon Survey	·	2.7 km	MPC · JPL
599897	2011 AF_{87}	—	January 14, 2011	Mount Lemmon	Mount Lemmon Survey	EUP	2.6 km	MPC · JPL
599898	2011 AR_{89}	—	January 8, 2011	Catalina	CSS	H	420 m	MPC · JPL
599899	2011 AC_{91}	—	November 28, 2014	Haleakala	Pan-STARRS 1	·	1.0 km	MPC · JPL
599900	2011 AE_{94}	—	January 11, 2011	Catalina	CSS	·	2.1 km	MPC · JPL

== 599901–600000 ==
back to top

Designation			Discovery			Properties		Ref
Permanent	Provisional	Named after	Date	Site	Discoverer(s)	Category	Diam.	Ref
599901	2011 AP_{95}	—	January 10, 2011	Mount Lemmon	Mount Lemmon Survey	EUN	910 m	MPC · JPL
599902	2011 AO_{96}	—	January 13, 2011	Mount Lemmon	Mount Lemmon Survey	·	1.4 km	MPC · JPL
599903	2011 AK_{101}	—	January 14, 2011	Mount Lemmon	Mount Lemmon Survey	·	2.2 km	MPC · JPL
599904	2011 AX_{103}	—	January 8, 2011	Mount Lemmon	Mount Lemmon Survey	·	650 m	MPC · JPL
599905	2011 BN	—	January 16, 2011	Mount Lemmon	Mount Lemmon Survey	·	2.4 km	MPC · JPL
599906	2011 BL_{8}	—	January 16, 2011	Mount Lemmon	Mount Lemmon Survey	THM	1.7 km	MPC · JPL
599907	2011 BA_{9}	—	January 16, 2011	Mount Lemmon	Mount Lemmon Survey	·	600 m	MPC · JPL
599908	2011 BC_{12}	—	January 4, 2011	Mount Lemmon	Mount Lemmon Survey	·	870 m	MPC · JPL
599909	2011 BM_{27}	—	October 16, 2002	Palomar	NEAT	·	1.4 km	MPC · JPL
599910	2011 BP_{27}	—	February 9, 2003	Desert Eagle	W. K. Y. Yeung	H	570 m	MPC · JPL
599911	2011 BC_{32}	—	January 12, 2011	Kitt Peak	Spacewatch	TIR	3.2 km	MPC · JPL
599912	2011 BH_{34}	—	January 28, 2011	Kitt Peak	Spacewatch	·	540 m	MPC · JPL
599913	2011 BM_{42}	—	January 30, 2011	Piszkés-tető	K. Sárneczky, S. Kürti	PHO	710 m	MPC · JPL
599914	2011 BY_{53}	—	December 8, 2010	Mount Lemmon	Mount Lemmon Survey	NYS	920 m	MPC · JPL
599915	2011 BF_{62}	—	January 26, 2011	Mount Lemmon	Mount Lemmon Survey	·	1.0 km	MPC · JPL
599916	2011 BV_{64}	—	January 16, 2011	Mount Lemmon	Mount Lemmon Survey	·	1.5 km	MPC · JPL
599917	2011 BH_{67}	—	January 28, 2011	Mount Lemmon	Mount Lemmon Survey	·	2.7 km	MPC · JPL
599918	2011 BC_{82}	—	February 6, 2006	Mount Lemmon	Mount Lemmon Survey	·	3.0 km	MPC · JPL
599919	2011 BG_{83}	—	April 7, 2008	Kitt Peak	Spacewatch	·	540 m	MPC · JPL
599920	2011 BK_{83}	—	January 16, 2005	Goodricke-Pigott	R. A. Tucker	T_{j} (2.97)	3.4 km	MPC · JPL
599921	2011 BC_{92}	—	January 13, 2011	Kitt Peak	Spacewatch	·	980 m	MPC · JPL
599922	2011 BC_{94}	—	January 29, 2011	Kitt Peak	Spacewatch	·	1.0 km	MPC · JPL
599923	2011 BQ_{96}	—	October 2, 2006	Mount Lemmon	Mount Lemmon Survey	·	640 m	MPC · JPL
599924	2011 BJ_{100}	—	February 5, 2011	Haleakala	Pan-STARRS 1	TIR	2.4 km	MPC · JPL
599925	2011 BP_{101}	—	April 19, 2004	Kitt Peak	Spacewatch	·	960 m	MPC · JPL
599926	2011 BN_{103}	—	October 16, 2006	Catalina	CSS	·	590 m	MPC · JPL
599927	2011 BV_{104}	—	January 27, 2007	Kitt Peak	Spacewatch	EUN	810 m	MPC · JPL
599928	2011 BO_{108}	—	February 10, 2011	Mount Lemmon	Mount Lemmon Survey	(5)	670 m	MPC · JPL
599929	2011 BA_{112}	—	February 12, 2011	Mount Lemmon	Mount Lemmon Survey	·	840 m	MPC · JPL
599930	2011 BB_{133}	—	January 29, 2011	Kitt Peak	Spacewatch	ADE	1.6 km	MPC · JPL
599931	2011 BH_{139}	—	January 8, 2011	Mount Lemmon	Mount Lemmon Survey	·	890 m	MPC · JPL
599932	2011 BB_{142}	—	January 29, 2011	Mount Lemmon	Mount Lemmon Survey	TEL	1.1 km	MPC · JPL
599933	2011 BP_{142}	—	January 8, 2011	Mount Lemmon	Mount Lemmon Survey	EOS	1.5 km	MPC · JPL
599934	2011 BQ_{149}	—	January 29, 2011	Mount Lemmon	Mount Lemmon Survey	·	500 m	MPC · JPL
599935	2011 BZ_{150}	—	January 29, 2011	Mount Lemmon	Mount Lemmon Survey	·	2.3 km	MPC · JPL
599936	2011 BS_{154}	—	January 27, 2011	Mount Lemmon	Mount Lemmon Survey	·	870 m	MPC · JPL
599937	2011 BW_{162}	—	January 12, 2011	Kitt Peak	Spacewatch	CLA	1.2 km	MPC · JPL
599938	2011 BV_{167}	—	February 5, 2011	Haleakala	Pan-STARRS 1	·	990 m	MPC · JPL
599939	2011 BL_{169}	—	January 30, 2011	Mount Lemmon	Mount Lemmon Survey	·	2.2 km	MPC · JPL
599940	2011 BK_{170}	—	March 11, 2007	Kitt Peak	Spacewatch	·	1.4 km	MPC · JPL
599941	2011 BZ_{170}	—	January 27, 2011	Mount Lemmon	Mount Lemmon Survey	·	990 m	MPC · JPL
599942	2011 BH_{172}	—	January 4, 2017	Haleakala	Pan-STARRS 1	TIR	2.8 km	MPC · JPL
599943	2011 BD_{173}	—	February 8, 2011	Mount Lemmon	Mount Lemmon Survey	·	850 m	MPC · JPL
599944	2011 BD_{174}	—	February 26, 2011	Mount Lemmon	Mount Lemmon Survey	URS	2.0 km	MPC · JPL
599945	2011 BO_{174}	—	February 5, 2011	Haleakala	Pan-STARRS 1	·	1.1 km	MPC · JPL
599946	2011 BM_{178}	—	January 28, 2011	Mount Lemmon	Mount Lemmon Survey	·	890 m	MPC · JPL
599947	2011 BR_{179}	—	January 26, 2011	Kitt Peak	Spacewatch	·	2.1 km	MPC · JPL
599948	2011 BU_{182}	—	August 27, 2014	Haleakala	Pan-STARRS 1	·	2.3 km	MPC · JPL
599949	2011 BR_{183}	—	January 29, 2011	Catalina	CSS	H	470 m	MPC · JPL
599950	2011 BV_{187}	—	February 7, 2011	Mount Lemmon	Mount Lemmon Survey	·	2.4 km	MPC · JPL
599951	2011 BD_{196}	—	October 10, 2002	Palomar	NEAT	MAS	660 m	MPC · JPL
599952	2011 BE_{196}	—	January 30, 2011	Haleakala	Pan-STARRS 1	MAR	720 m	MPC · JPL
599953	2011 BE_{198}	—	January 28, 2011	Kitt Peak	Spacewatch	·	940 m	MPC · JPL
599954	2011 BY_{198}	—	January 30, 2011	Mount Lemmon	Mount Lemmon Survey	·	2.3 km	MPC · JPL
599955	2011 CK_{5}	—	February 3, 2003	Kitt Peak	Spacewatch	H	430 m	MPC · JPL
599956	2011 CA_{6}	—	March 30, 2008	Kitt Peak	Spacewatch	·	650 m	MPC · JPL
599957	2011 CC_{19}	—	September 25, 2009	Sandlot	G. Hug	·	2.3 km	MPC · JPL
599958	2011 CM_{21}	—	February 7, 2011	Mount Lemmon	Mount Lemmon Survey	·	1.5 km	MPC · JPL
599959	2011 CO_{28}	—	August 26, 2009	Catalina	CSS	·	2.9 km	MPC · JPL
599960	2011 CL_{40}	—	September 19, 2003	Palomar	NEAT	T_{j} (2.99)	4.2 km	MPC · JPL
599961	2011 CP_{40}	—	January 30, 2011	Mount Lemmon	Mount Lemmon Survey	·	930 m	MPC · JPL
599962	2011 CU_{44}	—	July 22, 2003	Haleakala	NEAT	·	2.2 km	MPC · JPL
599963	2011 CX_{47}	—	February 17, 2007	Socorro	LINEAR	·	540 m	MPC · JPL
599964	2011 CH_{48}	—	January 26, 2011	Mount Lemmon	Mount Lemmon Survey	V	580 m	MPC · JPL
599965	2011 CU_{48}	—	January 12, 2011	Mount Lemmon	Mount Lemmon Survey	·	3.4 km	MPC · JPL
599966	2011 CS_{54}	—	February 8, 2011	Mount Lemmon	Mount Lemmon Survey	·	930 m	MPC · JPL
599967	2011 CR_{56}	—	February 8, 2011	Mount Lemmon	Mount Lemmon Survey	·	870 m	MPC · JPL
599968	2011 CJ_{62}	—	February 8, 2011	Mount Lemmon	Mount Lemmon Survey	·	1.2 km	MPC · JPL
599969	2011 CT_{67}	—	October 10, 2002	Palomar	NEAT	NYS	1.5 km	MPC · JPL
599970	2011 CW_{67}	—	February 13, 2002	Kitt Peak	Spacewatch	·	1.8 km	MPC · JPL
599971	2011 CH_{73}	—	March 7, 2003	Palomar	NEAT	H	590 m	MPC · JPL
599972	2011 CN_{73}	—	February 6, 2011	Catalina	CSS	·	1.1 km	MPC · JPL
599973	2011 CP_{79}	—	March 2, 2011	Mount Lemmon	Mount Lemmon Survey	·	1.0 km	MPC · JPL
599974	2011 CC_{84}	—	February 5, 2011	Haleakala	Pan-STARRS 1	·	830 m	MPC · JPL
599975	2011 CL_{88}	—	January 8, 2011	Mount Lemmon	Mount Lemmon Survey	H	430 m	MPC · JPL
599976	2011 CP_{97}	—	September 22, 2009	Kitt Peak	Spacewatch	·	1.2 km	MPC · JPL
599977	2011 CU_{97}	—	February 5, 2011	Haleakala	Pan-STARRS 1	·	2.8 km	MPC · JPL
599978	2011 CJ_{98}	—	February 5, 2011	Haleakala	Pan-STARRS 1	V	530 m	MPC · JPL
599979	2011 CD_{112}	—	February 5, 2011	Haleakala	Pan-STARRS 1	·	970 m	MPC · JPL
599980	2011 CG_{113}	—	September 7, 2008	Mount Lemmon	Mount Lemmon Survey	·	2.2 km	MPC · JPL
599981	2011 CK_{117}	—	February 11, 2011	Mount Lemmon	Mount Lemmon Survey	·	990 m	MPC · JPL
599982	2011 CK_{121}	—	February 12, 2011	Mount Lemmon	Mount Lemmon Survey	·	930 m	MPC · JPL
599983	2011 CP_{122}	—	February 28, 2014	Haleakala	Pan-STARRS 1	·	860 m	MPC · JPL
599984	2011 CK_{123}	—	February 4, 2011	Catalina	CSS	T_{j} (2.98) · EUP	3.1 km	MPC · JPL
599985	2011 CO_{139}	—	February 13, 2011	Mount Lemmon	Mount Lemmon Survey	KOR	1.1 km	MPC · JPL
599986	2011 CG_{142}	—	February 12, 2011	Mount Lemmon	Mount Lemmon Survey	·	1.0 km	MPC · JPL
599987	2011 DO_{11}	—	January 28, 2011	Mount Lemmon	Mount Lemmon Survey	·	480 m	MPC · JPL
599988	2011 DY_{27}	—	September 12, 2002	Palomar	NEAT	·	1.0 km	MPC · JPL
599989	2011 DM_{43}	—	March 11, 2007	Mount Lemmon	Mount Lemmon Survey	·	1.1 km	MPC · JPL
599990	2011 DG_{47}	—	June 30, 2008	Kitt Peak	Spacewatch	NYS	1 km	MPC · JPL
599991	2011 DT_{49}	—	October 15, 2002	Palomar	NEAT	·	1.6 km	MPC · JPL
599992	2011 DW_{51}	—	February 8, 2011	Catalina	CSS	·	1.3 km	MPC · JPL
599993	2011 DF_{59}	—	February 26, 2011	Mount Lemmon	Mount Lemmon Survey	·	1.4 km	MPC · JPL
599994	2011 EN	—	February 4, 2011	Catalina	CSS	·	2.3 km	MPC · JPL
599995	2011 EM_{9}	—	February 25, 2011	Kitt Peak	Spacewatch	H	380 m	MPC · JPL
599996	2011 EX_{11}	—	August 23, 2001	Kitt Peak	Spacewatch	·	1.7 km	MPC · JPL
599997	2011 EC_{20}	—	February 8, 2011	Mount Lemmon	Mount Lemmon Survey	PHO	920 m	MPC · JPL
599998	2011 EN_{21}	—	March 2, 2011	Catalina	CSS	·	2.3 km	MPC · JPL
599999	2011 EZ_{27}	—	March 6, 2011	Mount Lemmon	Mount Lemmon Survey	MAS	600 m	MPC · JPL
600000	2011 EG_{29}	—	February 25, 2011	Mount Lemmon	Mount Lemmon Survey	NYS	1 km	MPC · JPL

back to top

== Meaning of names ==
As minor planet discoveries are confirmed, they are given a permanent number by the IAU's Minor Planet Center (MPC), and the discoverers can then submit names for them, following the IAU's naming conventions. The list below concerns those minor planets in the specified number-range that have received names, and explains the meanings of those names.

Official naming citations of newly named small Solar System bodies are approved and published in a bulletin by IAU's Working Group for Small Bodies Nomenclature (WGSBN). Before May 2021, citations were published in MPC's Minor Planet Circulars for many decades. Recent citations can also be found on the JPL Small-Body Database (SBDB). Until his death in 2016, German astronomer Lutz D. Schmadel compiled these citations into the Dictionary of Minor Planet Names (DMP) and regularly updated the collection.

Based on Paul Herget's The Names of the Minor Planets, Schmadel also researched the unclear origin of numerous asteroids, most of which had been named prior to World War II. This article incorporates text from this source, which is in the public domain: SBDB New namings may only be added to this list below after official publication as the preannouncement of names is condemned. The WGSBN publishes a comprehensive guideline for the naming rules of non-cometary small Solar System bodies.

Named minor planet	Provisional	This minor planet was named for...	Ref · Catalog
599019 Jerzymadej	2009 QY_{36}	Jerzy Madej, Polish astronomer.	IAU · 599019
599083 Snezhko	2009 SJ_{101}	Leonid Snezhko, Russian astrophysicist.	IAU · 599083
599587 Shangjiaouni	2010 PN_{9}	Shangjiaouni (Shanghai Jiao Tong University), founded in 1896, is one of China's oldest and most prestigious universities.	IAU · 599587
599755 Alcarràs	2010 VL_{21}	Alcarràs is a village in Catalonia, Spain.	IAU · 599755
