= List of minor planets: 709001–710000 =

The following is a partial list of minor planets, running from minor-planet number 709001 through 710000, inclusive. The primary data for this and other partial lists is based on JPL's "Small-Body Orbital Elements" and data available from the Minor Planet Center. Critical list information is also provided by the MPC, unless otherwise specified from Lowell Observatory. A detailed description of the table's columns and additional sources are given on the main page including a complete list of every page in this series, and a statistical break-up on the dynamical classification of minor planets.

Also see the summary list of all named bodies in numerical and alphabetical order, and the corresponding naming citations for the number range of this particular list. New namings may only be added to this list after official publication, as the preannouncement of names is condemned by the Working Group for Small Bodies Nomenclature of the International Astronomical Union.

Near-Earth obj.	MBA (inner)	MBA (outer)	Centaur
Mars-crosser	MBA (middle)	Jupiter trojan	Trans-Neptunian obj.
Unclassified

== 709001–709100 ==
Designation			Discovery			Properties		Ref
Permanent	Provisional	Named after	Date	Site	Discoverer(s)	Category	Diam.	Ref
709001	2012 TZ_{156}	—	October 8, 2012	Haleakala	Pan-STARRS 1	SYL	3.0 km	MPC · JPL
709002	2012 TR_{159}	—	October 8, 2008	Kitt Peak	Spacewatch	·	830 m	MPC · JPL
709003	2012 TW_{165}	—	December 2, 2008	Kitt Peak	Spacewatch	·	1.1 km	MPC · JPL
709004	2012 TM_{166}	—	September 16, 2012	Tincana	Zolnowski, M., Kusiak, M.	EUN	870 m	MPC · JPL
709005	2012 TP_{167}	—	October 7, 2008	Mount Lemmon	Mount Lemmon Survey	·	1.0 km	MPC · JPL
709006	2012 TD_{168}	—	October 8, 2012	Haleakala	Pan-STARRS 1	(5)	900 m	MPC · JPL
709007	2012 TU_{171}	—	October 9, 2012	Mount Lemmon	Mount Lemmon Survey	AGN	920 m	MPC · JPL
709008	2012 TL_{176}	—	September 21, 2012	Kitt Peak	Spacewatch	·	1.4 km	MPC · JPL
709009	2012 TK_{187}	—	October 9, 2012	Mount Lemmon	Mount Lemmon Survey	·	1.2 km	MPC · JPL
709010	2012 TD_{193}	—	October 21, 2008	Kitt Peak	Spacewatch	·	1.3 km	MPC · JPL
709011	2012 TM_{194}	—	October 10, 2012	Kitt Peak	Spacewatch	·	1.5 km	MPC · JPL
709012	2012 TB_{195}	—	September 19, 2003	Kitt Peak	Spacewatch	·	1.4 km	MPC · JPL
709013	2012 TX_{195}	—	October 10, 2012	Kitt Peak	Spacewatch	ADE	1.9 km	MPC · JPL
709014	2012 TM_{197}	—	April 27, 2006	Cerro Tololo	Deep Ecliptic Survey	·	840 m	MPC · JPL
709015	2012 TA_{200}	—	September 21, 2003	Kitt Peak	Spacewatch	·	1.5 km	MPC · JPL
709016	2012 TC_{208}	—	October 11, 2012	Kitt Peak	Spacewatch	3:2	4.2 km	MPC · JPL
709017	2012 TY_{222}	—	October 14, 2012	Kitt Peak	Spacewatch	·	1.5 km	MPC · JPL
709018	2012 TH_{223}	—	March 11, 2002	Palomar	NEAT	·	1.5 km	MPC · JPL
709019	2012 TO_{224}	—	October 4, 2012	Mount Lemmon	Mount Lemmon Survey	·	2.9 km	MPC · JPL
709020	2012 TN_{226}	—	October 6, 2008	Mount Lemmon	Mount Lemmon Survey	(5)	1.1 km	MPC · JPL
709021	2012 TV_{226}	—	October 15, 2012	Haleakala	Pan-STARRS 1	·	680 m	MPC · JPL
709022	2012 TD_{227}	—	November 19, 2008	Mount Lemmon	Mount Lemmon Survey	·	1.2 km	MPC · JPL
709023	2012 TG_{229}	—	September 23, 2008	Kitt Peak	Spacewatch	·	720 m	MPC · JPL
709024	2012 TV_{232}	—	October 8, 2012	Piszkéstető	K. Sárneczky, G. Dálya	·	1.4 km	MPC · JPL
709025	2012 TL_{233}	—	April 6, 2011	Kitt Peak	Spacewatch	·	1.3 km	MPC · JPL
709026	2012 TT_{240}	—	August 8, 2004	Palomar	NEAT	NYS	1.1 km	MPC · JPL
709027	2012 TL_{241}	—	February 19, 2009	Mount Lemmon	Mount Lemmon Survey	·	3.2 km	MPC · JPL
709028	2012 TO_{244}	—	October 8, 2012	Haleakala	Pan-STARRS 1	·	1.4 km	MPC · JPL
709029	2012 TH_{245}	—	October 11, 2012	Mount Lemmon	Mount Lemmon Survey	·	1.1 km	MPC · JPL
709030	2012 TN_{245}	—	October 11, 2012	Mount Lemmon	Mount Lemmon Survey	·	1.1 km	MPC · JPL
709031	2012 TF_{246}	—	September 1, 2005	Kitt Peak	Spacewatch	SYL	3.5 km	MPC · JPL
709032	2012 TW_{250}	—	October 11, 2012	Haleakala	Pan-STARRS 1	·	1.5 km	MPC · JPL
709033	2012 TM_{251}	—	October 11, 2012	Haleakala	Pan-STARRS 1	·	1.0 km	MPC · JPL
709034	2012 TF_{253}	—	October 11, 2012	Haleakala	Pan-STARRS 1	·	1.1 km	MPC · JPL
709035	2012 TX_{258}	—	October 15, 2012	Haleakala	Pan-STARRS 1	(116763)	1.8 km	MPC · JPL
709036	2012 TN_{267}	—	February 28, 2009	Kitt Peak	Spacewatch	·	2.3 km	MPC · JPL
709037	2012 TS_{268}	—	September 13, 2007	Mount Lemmon	Mount Lemmon Survey	KOR	1.2 km	MPC · JPL
709038	2012 TR_{269}	—	October 11, 2012	Mount Lemmon	Mount Lemmon Survey	·	760 m	MPC · JPL
709039	2012 TT_{270}	—	October 11, 2012	Haleakala	Pan-STARRS 1	·	1.0 km	MPC · JPL
709040	2012 TQ_{273}	—	October 15, 2012	Mount Lemmon	Mount Lemmon Survey	·	1.2 km	MPC · JPL
709041	2012 TF_{279}	—	October 11, 2012	Haleakala	Pan-STARRS 1	AGN	860 m	MPC · JPL
709042	2012 TC_{281}	—	October 5, 2004	Kitt Peak	Spacewatch	3:2	4.4 km	MPC · JPL
709043	2012 TS_{281}	—	November 19, 2003	Kitt Peak	Spacewatch	·	1.8 km	MPC · JPL
709044	2012 TF_{282}	—	October 11, 2012	Mount Lemmon	Mount Lemmon Survey	·	1.3 km	MPC · JPL
709045	2012 TV_{284}	—	October 15, 2012	Haleakala	Pan-STARRS 1	L5	8.3 km	MPC · JPL
709046	2012 TK_{288}	—	December 19, 2004	Mount Lemmon	Mount Lemmon Survey	MAR	820 m	MPC · JPL
709047	2012 TN_{288}	—	October 10, 2012	Mount Lemmon	Mount Lemmon Survey	·	610 m	MPC · JPL
709048	2012 TK_{291}	—	September 19, 2008	Kitt Peak	Spacewatch	·	790 m	MPC · JPL
709049	2012 TH_{294}	—	December 2, 2008	Kitt Peak	Spacewatch	(5)	990 m	MPC · JPL
709050	2012 TV_{301}	—	October 7, 2012	Haleakala	Pan-STARRS 1	·	1.2 km	MPC · JPL
709051	2012 TY_{302}	—	October 8, 2012	Haleakala	Pan-STARRS 1	·	1.1 km	MPC · JPL
709052	2012 TO_{303}	—	September 17, 2012	Kitt Peak	Spacewatch	MAR	830 m	MPC · JPL
709053	2012 TA_{308}	—	October 10, 2012	Haleakala	Pan-STARRS 1	·	1.8 km	MPC · JPL
709054	2012 TO_{310}	—	October 7, 2005	Mauna Kea	A. Boattini	MAS	770 m	MPC · JPL
709055	2012 TY_{315}	—	January 1, 2009	Kitt Peak	Spacewatch	·	1.7 km	MPC · JPL
709056	2012 TD_{316}	—	September 14, 2012	Mount Lemmon	Mount Lemmon Survey	·	1.1 km	MPC · JPL
709057	2012 TT_{323}	—	January 25, 2009	Kitt Peak	Spacewatch	·	1.4 km	MPC · JPL
709058	2012 TV_{331}	—	October 14, 2012	Nogales	M. Schwartz, P. R. Holvorcem	·	1.6 km	MPC · JPL
709059	2012 TX_{331}	—	December 21, 2008	Mount Lemmon	Mount Lemmon Survey	AGN	1.0 km	MPC · JPL
709060	2012 TU_{334}	—	August 17, 2006	Palomar	NEAT	·	2.3 km	MPC · JPL
709061	2012 TC_{346}	—	February 20, 2015	Haleakala	Pan-STARRS 1	·	1.0 km	MPC · JPL
709062	2012 TK_{352}	—	October 8, 2012	Haleakala	Pan-STARRS 1	·	1.4 km	MPC · JPL
709063	2012 TZ_{353}	—	April 20, 2015	Haleakala	Pan-STARRS 1	(194)	1.5 km	MPC · JPL
709064	2012 TX_{360}	—	October 14, 2012	Kitt Peak	Spacewatch	·	820 m	MPC · JPL
709065	2012 TF_{363}	—	October 5, 2012	Haleakala	Pan-STARRS 1	·	1.5 km	MPC · JPL
709066	2012 TA_{364}	—	October 6, 2012	Haleakala	Pan-STARRS 1	·	840 m	MPC · JPL
709067	2012 TF_{365}	—	October 8, 2012	Mount Lemmon	Mount Lemmon Survey	·	1.4 km	MPC · JPL
709068	2012 TK_{365}	—	October 11, 2012	Haleakala	Pan-STARRS 1	·	560 m	MPC · JPL
709069	2012 TZ_{365}	—	October 11, 2012	Haleakala	Pan-STARRS 1	·	780 m	MPC · JPL
709070	2012 TV_{366}	—	October 11, 2012	Haleakala	Pan-STARRS 1	·	880 m	MPC · JPL
709071	2012 TP_{370}	—	October 8, 2012	Kitt Peak	Spacewatch	·	3.1 km	MPC · JPL
709072	2012 TX_{372}	—	October 15, 2012	Haleakala	Pan-STARRS 1	AEO	940 m	MPC · JPL
709073	2012 TO_{373}	—	October 15, 2012	Mount Lemmon	Mount Lemmon Survey	·	1.2 km	MPC · JPL
709074	2012 TR_{373}	—	October 4, 2012	Mount Lemmon	Mount Lemmon Survey	·	1.2 km	MPC · JPL
709075	2012 TC_{374}	—	October 7, 2012	Haleakala	Pan-STARRS 1	·	1.3 km	MPC · JPL
709076	2012 TT_{375}	—	October 9, 2012	Mount Lemmon	Mount Lemmon Survey	·	1.6 km	MPC · JPL
709077	2012 TW_{378}	—	October 8, 2012	Haleakala	Pan-STARRS 1	HOF	1.8 km	MPC · JPL
709078	2012 TA_{382}	—	October 9, 2012	Mount Lemmon	Mount Lemmon Survey	·	1.3 km	MPC · JPL
709079	2012 TL_{382}	—	October 10, 2012	Mount Lemmon	Mount Lemmon Survey	·	1.3 km	MPC · JPL
709080	2012 TH_{388}	—	October 9, 2012	Haleakala	Pan-STARRS 1	·	1.2 km	MPC · JPL
709081	2012 TH_{405}	—	October 11, 2012	Haleakala	Pan-STARRS 1	·	690 m	MPC · JPL
709082	2012 UT_{3}	—	October 16, 2012	Mount Lemmon	Mount Lemmon Survey	·	1.0 km	MPC · JPL
709083	2012 UA_{7}	—	April 21, 2011	Haleakala	Pan-STARRS 1	·	1.1 km	MPC · JPL
709084	2012 UL_{9}	—	October 16, 2012	Mount Lemmon	Mount Lemmon Survey	(5)	940 m	MPC · JPL
709085	2012 US_{10}	—	September 18, 2012	Kitt Peak	Spacewatch	·	1.4 km	MPC · JPL
709086	2012 UT_{13}	—	October 16, 2012	Mount Lemmon	Mount Lemmon Survey	·	1.1 km	MPC · JPL
709087	2012 UE_{15}	—	May 24, 2011	Haleakala	Pan-STARRS 1	·	1.2 km	MPC · JPL
709088	2012 UU_{19}	—	September 19, 2007	Kitt Peak	Spacewatch	·	1.3 km	MPC · JPL
709089	2012 UA_{23}	—	October 17, 2012	Mount Lemmon	Mount Lemmon Survey	·	1.7 km	MPC · JPL
709090	2012 US_{24}	—	October 17, 2012	Mount Lemmon	Mount Lemmon Survey	·	1.1 km	MPC · JPL
709091	2012 UB_{27}	—	October 17, 2012	Haleakala	Pan-STARRS 1	·	1.2 km	MPC · JPL
709092	2012 UD_{27}	—	October 6, 2012	Haleakala	Pan-STARRS 1	·	1.3 km	MPC · JPL
709093	2012 UO_{29}	—	September 29, 2003	Anderson Mesa	LONEOS	·	1.9 km	MPC · JPL
709094	2012 UR_{33}	—	April 12, 2010	Mount Lemmon	Mount Lemmon Survey	·	2.0 km	MPC · JPL
709095	2012 UV_{41}	—	August 24, 2003	Cerro Tololo	Deep Ecliptic Survey	·	1.2 km	MPC · JPL
709096	2012 UF_{43}	—	October 17, 2012	Haleakala	Pan-STARRS 1	THM	1.7 km	MPC · JPL
709097	2012 UJ_{44}	—	September 19, 2003	Palomar	NEAT	·	1.6 km	MPC · JPL
709098	2012 UF_{49}	—	October 18, 2012	Haleakala	Pan-STARRS 1	·	850 m	MPC · JPL
709099	2012 UU_{52}	—	August 31, 2000	Kitt Peak	Spacewatch	·	2.7 km	MPC · JPL
709100	2012 UC_{55}	—	September 24, 2008	Mount Lemmon	Mount Lemmon Survey	·	1.3 km	MPC · JPL

== 709101–709200 ==
back to top

Designation			Discovery			Properties		Ref
Permanent	Provisional	Named after	Date	Site	Discoverer(s)	Category	Diam.	Ref
709101	2012 UP_{59}	—	October 19, 2012	Haleakala	Pan-STARRS 1	·	2.7 km	MPC · JPL
709102	2012 UX_{61}	—	October 10, 2004	Kitt Peak	Spacewatch	3:2	4.1 km	MPC · JPL
709103	2012 UL_{64}	—	October 20, 2012	Mount Lemmon	Mount Lemmon Survey	·	1.6 km	MPC · JPL
709104	2012 UY_{65}	—	October 20, 2012	Kitt Peak	Spacewatch	·	2.0 km	MPC · JPL
709105	2012 UL_{66}	—	October 15, 2004	Mount Lemmon	Mount Lemmon Survey	·	730 m	MPC · JPL
709106	2012 UY_{71}	—	October 17, 2012	Haleakala	Pan-STARRS 1	·	1.1 km	MPC · JPL
709107	2012 UN_{76}	—	October 18, 2012	Haleakala	Pan-STARRS 1	·	1.4 km	MPC · JPL
709108	2012 UJ_{80}	—	October 19, 2012	Haleakala	Pan-STARRS 1	·	2.1 km	MPC · JPL
709109	2012 UO_{83}	—	October 20, 2012	Kitt Peak	Spacewatch	·	440 m	MPC · JPL
709110	2012 UA_{93}	—	August 2, 1995	Kitt Peak	Spacewatch	·	860 m	MPC · JPL
709111	2012 UX_{98}	—	September 19, 2012	Mount Lemmon	Mount Lemmon Survey	(5)	860 m	MPC · JPL
709112	2012 UZ_{102}	—	September 22, 2003	Kitt Peak	Spacewatch	·	1.3 km	MPC · JPL
709113	2012 UW_{104}	—	October 19, 2012	Mount Lemmon	Mount Lemmon Survey	·	1.7 km	MPC · JPL
709114	2012 UE_{105}	—	November 1, 2008	Kitt Peak	Spacewatch	HNS	840 m	MPC · JPL
709115	2012 UD_{109}	—	November 22, 2008	Kitt Peak	Spacewatch	·	1.4 km	MPC · JPL
709116	2012 UC_{114}	—	September 15, 2012	Mount Lemmon	Mount Lemmon Survey	·	1.3 km	MPC · JPL
709117	2012 UN_{121}	—	October 22, 2012	Haleakala	Pan-STARRS 1	URS	3.5 km	MPC · JPL
709118	2012 UK_{123}	—	October 22, 2012	Haleakala	Pan-STARRS 1	·	1.2 km	MPC · JPL
709119	2012 UA_{125}	—	April 8, 2010	Mount Lemmon	Mount Lemmon Survey	·	2.0 km	MPC · JPL
709120	2012 UW_{125}	—	October 22, 2012	Haleakala	Pan-STARRS 1	WIT	720 m	MPC · JPL
709121	2012 UY_{130}	—	November 3, 2008	Kitt Peak	Spacewatch	·	1.4 km	MPC · JPL
709122	2012 UT_{133}	—	October 10, 2012	Nogales	M. Schwartz, P. R. Holvorcem	EUN	1.1 km	MPC · JPL
709123	2012 UO_{134}	—	October 19, 2012	Mount Lemmon	Mount Lemmon Survey	T_{j} (2.94)	3.4 km	MPC · JPL
709124	2012 UL_{139}	—	October 10, 2012	Mount Lemmon	Mount Lemmon Survey	·	560 m	MPC · JPL
709125	2012 UD_{142}	—	August 10, 2007	Kitt Peak	Spacewatch	·	1.5 km	MPC · JPL
709126	2012 UV_{142}	—	October 18, 2012	Haleakala	Pan-STARRS 1	·	3.0 km	MPC · JPL
709127	2012 UA_{144}	—	October 8, 2012	Kitt Peak	Spacewatch	·	420 m	MPC · JPL
709128	2012 UH_{144}	—	October 18, 2012	Haleakala	Pan-STARRS 1	3:2	3.7 km	MPC · JPL
709129	2012 UL_{148}	—	April 24, 2011	Mount Lemmon	Mount Lemmon Survey	V	560 m	MPC · JPL
709130	2012 UA_{150}	—	August 28, 2012	Mount Lemmon	Mount Lemmon Survey	·	670 m	MPC · JPL
709131	2012 UV_{150}	—	October 18, 2003	Apache Point	SDSS	(5)	1.2 km	MPC · JPL
709132	2012 UW_{151}	—	October 13, 2012	Kitt Peak	Spacewatch	·	1.3 km	MPC · JPL
709133	2012 UK_{157}	—	October 23, 2012	Haleakala	Pan-STARRS 1	·	900 m	MPC · JPL
709134	2012 UP_{158}	—	October 18, 2012	Haleakala	Pan-STARRS 1	L5	7.7 km	MPC · JPL
709135	2012 UO_{160}	—	September 6, 2008	Mount Lemmon	Mount Lemmon Survey	·	880 m	MPC · JPL
709136	2012 UG_{165}	—	December 14, 2004	Campo Imperatore	CINEOS	EUN	1.3 km	MPC · JPL
709137	2012 UN_{168}	—	September 15, 2003	Haleakala	NEAT	·	2.0 km	MPC · JPL
709138	2012 UB_{172}	—	September 19, 2003	Palomar	NEAT	·	2.1 km	MPC · JPL
709139	2012 UT_{174}	—	November 21, 2008	Mount Lemmon	Mount Lemmon Survey	EUN	760 m	MPC · JPL
709140	2012 UB_{183}	—	October 21, 2012	Haleakala	Pan-STARRS 1	·	1.0 km	MPC · JPL
709141	2012 UY_{183}	—	October 18, 2012	Haleakala	Pan-STARRS 1	·	1.2 km	MPC · JPL
709142	2012 UD_{186}	—	June 14, 2016	Mount Lemmon	Mount Lemmon Survey	(116763)	1.7 km	MPC · JPL
709143	2012 UN_{186}	—	October 19, 2012	Mount Lemmon	Mount Lemmon Survey	·	1.2 km	MPC · JPL
709144	2012 UO_{187}	—	October 5, 2016	Mount Lemmon	Mount Lemmon Survey	·	1.1 km	MPC · JPL
709145	2012 UX_{188}	—	January 29, 2014	Catalina	CSS	·	2.9 km	MPC · JPL
709146	2012 UO_{192}	—	April 24, 2014	Mount Lemmon	Mount Lemmon Survey	·	470 m	MPC · JPL
709147	2012 US_{192}	—	October 22, 2012	Mount Lemmon	Mount Lemmon Survey	EUN	790 m	MPC · JPL
709148	2012 UO_{210}	—	October 22, 2012	Haleakala	Pan-STARRS 1	·	1.1 km	MPC · JPL
709149	2012 US_{212}	—	October 21, 2012	Kitt Peak	Spacewatch	·	1.2 km	MPC · JPL
709150	2012 UC_{218}	—	October 18, 2012	Haleakala	Pan-STARRS 1	·	1.2 km	MPC · JPL
709151	2012 UD_{220}	—	October 18, 2012	Haleakala	Pan-STARRS 1	·	1.7 km	MPC · JPL
709152	2012 UQ_{221}	—	September 5, 2016	Mount Lemmon	Mount Lemmon Survey	·	940 m	MPC · JPL
709153	2012 UM_{222}	—	October 23, 2012	Mount Lemmon	Mount Lemmon Survey	SYL	3.0 km	MPC · JPL
709154	2012 UD_{223}	—	October 19, 2012	Haleakala	Pan-STARRS 1	VER	2.3 km	MPC · JPL
709155	2012 UY_{224}	—	October 18, 2012	Piszkés-tető	K. Sárneczky, G. Hodosán	·	2.9 km	MPC · JPL
709156	2012 UC_{235}	—	October 18, 2012	Haleakala	Pan-STARRS 1	·	1.3 km	MPC · JPL
709157	2012 UE_{235}	—	October 16, 2012	Mount Lemmon	Mount Lemmon Survey	·	1.1 km	MPC · JPL
709158	2012 UP_{237}	—	October 22, 2012	Mount Lemmon	Mount Lemmon Survey	AGN	860 m	MPC · JPL
709159	2012 UV_{240}	—	October 17, 2012	Haleakala	Pan-STARRS 1	·	1.2 km	MPC · JPL
709160	2012 UB_{241}	—	October 19, 2012	Haleakala	Pan-STARRS 1	·	1.3 km	MPC · JPL
709161	2012 UT_{243}	—	October 22, 2012	Mount Lemmon	Mount Lemmon Survey	(5)	1.0 km	MPC · JPL
709162	2012 UK_{246}	—	October 23, 2012	Mount Lemmon	Mount Lemmon Survey	KOR	950 m	MPC · JPL
709163	2012 UO_{252}	—	October 22, 2012	Haleakala	Pan-STARRS 1	·	1.2 km	MPC · JPL
709164	2012 UV_{264}	—	October 22, 2012	Haleakala	Pan-STARRS 1	EOS	1.2 km	MPC · JPL
709165	2012 UJ_{266}	—	October 17, 2012	Haleakala	Pan-STARRS 1	·	2.9 km	MPC · JPL
709166	2012 VL	—	October 22, 2012	Catalina	CSS	BRG	1.1 km	MPC · JPL
709167	2012 VR_{3}	—	November 3, 2012	Mount Lemmon	Mount Lemmon Survey	·	1.4 km	MPC · JPL
709168	2012 VE_{11}	—	October 8, 2012	Haleakala	Pan-STARRS 1	KOR	980 m	MPC · JPL
709169	2012 VY_{16}	—	November 5, 2012	Kitt Peak	Spacewatch	·	1.9 km	MPC · JPL
709170	2012 VP_{17}	—	November 7, 2008	Mount Lemmon	Mount Lemmon Survey	·	1.0 km	MPC · JPL
709171	2012 VH_{19}	—	November 2, 2008	Mount Lemmon	Mount Lemmon Survey	·	1.0 km	MPC · JPL
709172	2012 VD_{24}	—	October 16, 2012	Kitt Peak	Spacewatch	·	2.2 km	MPC · JPL
709173	2012 VK_{34}	—	November 17, 2008	Kitt Peak	Spacewatch	·	1.0 km	MPC · JPL
709174	2012 VA_{40}	—	October 27, 2012	Mount Lemmon	Mount Lemmon Survey	·	890 m	MPC · JPL
709175	2012 VK_{42}	—	October 27, 2012	Mount Lemmon	Mount Lemmon Survey	·	1.5 km	MPC · JPL
709176	2012 VO_{42}	—	November 6, 2012	Kitt Peak	Spacewatch	3:2	4.7 km	MPC · JPL
709177	2012 VL_{43}	—	November 11, 2004	Kitt Peak	Spacewatch	·	950 m	MPC · JPL
709178	2012 VT_{44}	—	November 19, 2003	Kitt Peak	Spacewatch	·	1.6 km	MPC · JPL
709179	2012 VB_{46}	—	October 16, 2012	Kitt Peak	Spacewatch	·	1.4 km	MPC · JPL
709180	2012 VF_{57}	—	November 7, 2012	Haleakala	Pan-STARRS 1	·	1.4 km	MPC · JPL
709181	2012 VG_{60}	—	November 18, 2008	Kitt Peak	Spacewatch	·	840 m	MPC · JPL
709182	2012 VJ_{63}	—	February 23, 2007	Kitt Peak	Spacewatch	·	550 m	MPC · JPL
709183	2012 VQ_{64}	—	November 6, 2012	Mount Lemmon	Mount Lemmon Survey	·	1.4 km	MPC · JPL
709184	2012 VU_{66}	—	October 11, 2012	Haleakala	Pan-STARRS 1	·	1.3 km	MPC · JPL
709185	2012 VX_{66}	—	October 18, 2012	Haleakala	Pan-STARRS 1	·	1.3 km	MPC · JPL
709186	2012 VM_{67}	—	October 8, 2012	Kitt Peak	Spacewatch	·	1.6 km	MPC · JPL
709187	2012 VH_{76}	—	November 13, 2012	Mount Lemmon	Mount Lemmon Survey	·	2.6 km	MPC · JPL
709188	2012 VY_{78}	—	November 14, 2012	Kitt Peak	Spacewatch	·	480 m	MPC · JPL
709189	2012 VY_{79}	—	November 14, 2012	Mount Lemmon	Mount Lemmon Survey	·	1.3 km	MPC · JPL
709190	2012 VZ_{85}	—	November 6, 2012	Kitt Peak	Spacewatch	·	580 m	MPC · JPL
709191	2012 VY_{88}	—	November 13, 2012	ESA OGS	ESA OGS	·	1.1 km	MPC · JPL
709192	2012 VA_{89}	—	January 16, 2005	Mauna Kea	Veillet, C.	·	950 m	MPC · JPL
709193 Concettafinardi	2012 VF_{94}	Concettafinardi	November 13, 2012	Mount Graham	K. Černis, R. P. Boyle	·	460 m	MPC · JPL
709194	2012 VM_{94}	—	November 12, 2012	Mount Lemmon	Mount Lemmon Survey	·	1.3 km	MPC · JPL
709195	2012 VZ_{94}	—	September 3, 2005	Mauna Kea	P. A. Wiegert	·	490 m	MPC · JPL
709196	2012 VL_{96}	—	September 27, 2003	Kitt Peak	Spacewatch	·	1.3 km	MPC · JPL
709197	2012 VV_{101}	—	November 11, 2012	Nogales	M. Schwartz, P. R. Holvorcem	·	1.0 km	MPC · JPL
709198	2012 VX_{101}	—	January 29, 2004	Kitt Peak	Spacewatch	KOR	1.2 km	MPC · JPL
709199	2012 VK_{102}	—	October 16, 2007	Kitt Peak	Spacewatch	KOR	1.1 km	MPC · JPL
709200	2012 VD_{103}	—	November 13, 2012	ESA OGS	ESA OGS	·	1.2 km	MPC · JPL

== 709201–709300 ==
back to top

Designation			Discovery			Properties		Ref
Permanent	Provisional	Named after	Date	Site	Discoverer(s)	Category	Diam.	Ref
709201	2012 VN_{108}	—	November 6, 2012	Kitt Peak	Spacewatch	·	2.5 km	MPC · JPL
709202	2012 VX_{112}	—	September 18, 2003	Kitt Peak	Spacewatch	·	1.2 km	MPC · JPL
709203	2012 VG_{114}	—	January 4, 2016	Haleakala	Pan-STARRS 1	L5	5.9 km	MPC · JPL
709204	2012 VQ_{115}	—	November 14, 2012	Kitt Peak	Spacewatch	·	1.2 km	MPC · JPL
709205	2012 VO_{116}	—	April 23, 2015	Haleakala	Pan-STARRS 1	·	1.1 km	MPC · JPL
709206	2012 VN_{118}	—	November 7, 2012	Mount Lemmon	Mount Lemmon Survey	·	1.5 km	MPC · JPL
709207	2012 VV_{119}	—	November 14, 2012	Kitt Peak	Spacewatch	·	930 m	MPC · JPL
709208	2012 VF_{122}	—	November 7, 2012	Mount Lemmon	Mount Lemmon Survey	·	1.6 km	MPC · JPL
709209	2012 VN_{122}	—	November 7, 2012	Haleakala	Pan-STARRS 1	·	490 m	MPC · JPL
709210	2012 VD_{124}	—	April 19, 2010	WISE	WISE	L5	8.5 km	MPC · JPL
709211	2012 VH_{124}	—	November 14, 2012	Mount Lemmon	Mount Lemmon Survey	MAR	750 m	MPC · JPL
709212	2012 VR_{124}	—	November 13, 2017	Haleakala	Pan-STARRS 1	·	1.2 km	MPC · JPL
709213	2012 VX_{124}	—	August 30, 2016	Haleakala	Pan-STARRS 1	·	1.3 km	MPC · JPL
709214	2012 VQ_{128}	—	November 7, 2012	Mount Lemmon	Mount Lemmon Survey	·	1.1 km	MPC · JPL
709215	2012 VS_{132}	—	November 6, 2012	Kitt Peak	Spacewatch	·	980 m	MPC · JPL
709216	2012 VU_{137}	—	October 18, 2012	Haleakala	Pan-STARRS 1	·	1.5 km	MPC · JPL
709217	2012 VZ_{140}	—	May 10, 2015	Mount Lemmon	Mount Lemmon Survey	·	1.2 km	MPC · JPL
709218	2012 WD_{2}	—	October 7, 1996	Kitt Peak	Spacewatch	3:2 · SHU	3.7 km	MPC · JPL
709219	2012 WG_{2}	—	August 24, 2001	Kitt Peak	Spacewatch	·	1.5 km	MPC · JPL
709220	2012 WA_{4}	—	October 23, 2012	Mount Lemmon	Mount Lemmon Survey	ADE	1.4 km	MPC · JPL
709221	2012 WE_{5}	—	October 23, 2012	Kitt Peak	Spacewatch	·	990 m	MPC · JPL
709222	2012 WJ_{6}	—	November 17, 2012	Kitt Peak	Spacewatch	·	2.3 km	MPC · JPL
709223	2012 WN_{16}	—	November 12, 2012	Nogales	M. Schwartz, P. R. Holvorcem	(1547)	1.5 km	MPC · JPL
709224	2012 WE_{19}	—	January 20, 2009	Kitt Peak	Spacewatch	·	1.3 km	MPC · JPL
709225	2012 WP_{19}	—	November 20, 2012	Mount Lemmon	Mount Lemmon Survey	·	1.8 km	MPC · JPL
709226	2012 WO_{20}	—	November 20, 2012	Mount Lemmon	Mount Lemmon Survey	·	1.7 km	MPC · JPL
709227	2012 WR_{20}	—	November 20, 2012	Mount Lemmon	Mount Lemmon Survey	·	640 m	MPC · JPL
709228	2012 WW_{20}	—	October 27, 2012	Mount Lemmon	Mount Lemmon Survey	HNS	990 m	MPC · JPL
709229	2012 WX_{25}	—	December 18, 2009	Mount Lemmon	Mount Lemmon Survey	·	620 m	MPC · JPL
709230	2012 WN_{26}	—	November 7, 2012	Kitt Peak	Spacewatch	ADE	2.0 km	MPC · JPL
709231	2012 WC_{28}	—	October 20, 2012	Kislovodsk	Zeloyniy, O.	·	1.8 km	MPC · JPL
709232	2012 WE_{28}	—	October 9, 2012	Mount Lemmon	Mount Lemmon Survey	·	1.5 km	MPC · JPL
709233	2012 WH_{29}	—	April 27, 2006	Cerro Tololo	Deep Ecliptic Survey	·	1.2 km	MPC · JPL
709234	2012 WU_{31}	—	November 17, 2012	Mount Lemmon	Mount Lemmon Survey	·	700 m	MPC · JPL
709235	2012 WL_{32}	—	November 23, 2012	Mount Graham	Boyle, R. P., V. Laugalys	KOR	1.1 km	MPC · JPL
709236	2012 WE_{34}	—	November 26, 2012	Mount Lemmon	Mount Lemmon Survey	·	1.8 km	MPC · JPL
709237	2012 WQ_{34}	—	October 1, 2003	Kitt Peak	Spacewatch	·	1.5 km	MPC · JPL
709238	2012 WW_{34}	—	November 26, 2012	Mount Lemmon	Mount Lemmon Survey	·	1.2 km	MPC · JPL
709239	2012 WN_{36}	—	November 27, 2012	Mount Lemmon	Mount Lemmon Survey	·	1.4 km	MPC · JPL
709240	2012 WO_{36}	—	November 26, 2012	Mount Lemmon	Mount Lemmon Survey	·	1.8 km	MPC · JPL
709241	2012 WR_{36}	—	November 22, 2012	Calar Alto-CASADO	Mottola, S.	·	2.8 km	MPC · JPL
709242	2012 WT_{37}	—	November 26, 2012	Mount Lemmon	Mount Lemmon Survey	·	1.5 km	MPC · JPL
709243	2012 WX_{38}	—	February 10, 2014	Haleakala	Pan-STARRS 1	·	980 m	MPC · JPL
709244	2012 WN_{43}	—	November 23, 2012	Kitt Peak	Spacewatch	·	1.3 km	MPC · JPL
709245	2012 WT_{43}	—	November 23, 2012	Kitt Peak	Spacewatch	·	1.2 km	MPC · JPL
709246	2012 WX_{43}	—	November 17, 2012	Mount Lemmon	Mount Lemmon Survey	KOR	860 m	MPC · JPL
709247	2012 XJ_{1}	—	September 29, 2008	Mount Lemmon	Mount Lemmon Survey	·	1.2 km	MPC · JPL
709248	2012 XG_{2}	—	October 16, 2003	Kitt Peak	Spacewatch	·	1.2 km	MPC · JPL
709249	2012 XF_{5}	—	December 4, 2012	Mount Lemmon	Mount Lemmon Survey	MAR	850 m	MPC · JPL
709250	2012 XE_{6}	—	December 5, 2008	Kitt Peak	Spacewatch	·	1.4 km	MPC · JPL
709251	2012 XL_{6}	—	December 4, 2012	Mount Lemmon	Mount Lemmon Survey	·	1.6 km	MPC · JPL
709252	2012 XR_{7}	—	December 2, 2012	Mount Lemmon	Mount Lemmon Survey	MAR	1.1 km	MPC · JPL
709253	2012 XB_{10}	—	December 3, 2008	Mount Lemmon	Mount Lemmon Survey	·	1.2 km	MPC · JPL
709254	2012 XC_{14}	—	November 19, 2012	Kitt Peak	Spacewatch	·	1.7 km	MPC · JPL
709255	2012 XC_{15}	—	October 31, 2008	Mount Lemmon	Mount Lemmon Survey	·	1.9 km	MPC · JPL
709256	2012 XV_{18}	—	November 19, 2008	Mount Lemmon	Mount Lemmon Survey	·	1.8 km	MPC · JPL
709257	2012 XZ_{27}	—	November 7, 2012	Kitt Peak	Spacewatch	(5)	1.2 km	MPC · JPL
709258	2012 XX_{30}	—	November 7, 2012	Mount Lemmon	Mount Lemmon Survey	·	1.2 km	MPC · JPL
709259	2012 XB_{36}	—	July 28, 2011	Haleakala	Pan-STARRS 1	WIT	880 m	MPC · JPL
709260	2012 XP_{37}	—	September 12, 2007	Kitt Peak	Spacewatch	·	1.4 km	MPC · JPL
709261	2012 XT_{37}	—	December 3, 2012	Mount Lemmon	Mount Lemmon Survey	·	1.8 km	MPC · JPL
709262	2012 XT_{41}	—	December 3, 2012	Mount Lemmon	Mount Lemmon Survey	·	1.5 km	MPC · JPL
709263	2012 XA_{42}	—	August 10, 2007	Kitt Peak	Spacewatch	·	1.2 km	MPC · JPL
709264	2012 XK_{43}	—	June 27, 2011	Mount Lemmon	Mount Lemmon Survey	·	1.1 km	MPC · JPL
709265	2012 XT_{44}	—	December 3, 2012	Mount Lemmon	Mount Lemmon Survey	·	2.0 km	MPC · JPL
709266	2012 XE_{45}	—	January 27, 2007	Kitt Peak	Spacewatch	·	620 m	MPC · JPL
709267	2012 XN_{47}	—	October 1, 2005	Kitt Peak	Spacewatch	·	610 m	MPC · JPL
709268	2012 XA_{52}	—	April 15, 2010	WISE	WISE	PHO	870 m	MPC · JPL
709269	2012 XG_{58}	—	March 13, 2002	Kitt Peak	Spacewatch	NYS	950 m	MPC · JPL
709270	2012 XT_{62}	—	January 16, 2009	Mount Lemmon	Mount Lemmon Survey	·	1.5 km	MPC · JPL
709271	2012 XD_{63}	—	December 4, 2012	Mount Lemmon	Mount Lemmon Survey	·	2.4 km	MPC · JPL
709272	2012 XC_{66}	—	September 30, 2003	Kitt Peak	Spacewatch	·	1.2 km	MPC · JPL
709273	2012 XQ_{68}	—	December 5, 2012	Mount Lemmon	Mount Lemmon Survey	·	980 m	MPC · JPL
709274	2012 XS_{72}	—	December 6, 2012	Mount Lemmon	Mount Lemmon Survey	(5)	960 m	MPC · JPL
709275	2012 XX_{74}	—	December 6, 2012	Mount Lemmon	Mount Lemmon Survey	·	1.2 km	MPC · JPL
709276	2012 XO_{76}	—	October 9, 2012	Mount Lemmon	Mount Lemmon Survey	·	1.9 km	MPC · JPL
709277	2012 XF_{78}	—	December 6, 2012	Mount Lemmon	Mount Lemmon Survey	·	1.5 km	MPC · JPL
709278	2012 XJ_{78}	—	December 6, 2012	Mount Lemmon	Mount Lemmon Survey	KOR	1.1 km	MPC · JPL
709279	2012 XW_{78}	—	September 29, 2008	Mount Lemmon	Mount Lemmon Survey	·	980 m	MPC · JPL
709280	2012 XX_{80}	—	August 23, 2007	Kitt Peak	Spacewatch	·	1.4 km	MPC · JPL
709281	2012 XO_{82}	—	May 19, 2010	Mount Lemmon	Mount Lemmon Survey	·	2.5 km	MPC · JPL
709282	2012 XR_{83}	—	January 17, 2004	Palomar	NEAT	·	1.4 km	MPC · JPL
709283	2012 XS_{84}	—	December 7, 2012	Haleakala	Pan-STARRS 1	·	1.1 km	MPC · JPL
709284	2012 XV_{86}	—	November 22, 2012	Kitt Peak	Spacewatch	·	890 m	MPC · JPL
709285	2012 XB_{87}	—	November 13, 2012	ESA OGS	ESA OGS	·	1.2 km	MPC · JPL
709286	2012 XH_{87}	—	December 8, 2012	Mount Lemmon	Mount Lemmon Survey	KOR	1.0 km	MPC · JPL
709287	2012 XR_{88}	—	September 13, 2007	Mount Lemmon	Mount Lemmon Survey	·	1.2 km	MPC · JPL
709288	2012 XM_{91}	—	November 12, 2012	Mount Lemmon	Mount Lemmon Survey	·	1.0 km	MPC · JPL
709289	2012 XW_{107}	—	December 8, 2012	Mount Lemmon	Mount Lemmon Survey	EOS	2.0 km	MPC · JPL
709290	2012 XK_{110}	—	November 13, 2012	Nogales	M. Schwartz, P. R. Holvorcem	·	1.1 km	MPC · JPL
709291	2012 XO_{115}	—	October 19, 2012	Haleakala	Pan-STARRS 1	EOS	1.7 km	MPC · JPL
709292	2012 XO_{116}	—	December 8, 2012	Nogales	M. Schwartz, P. R. Holvorcem	·	1.8 km	MPC · JPL
709293	2012 XO_{122}	—	September 15, 2004	Kitt Peak	Spacewatch	·	1.2 km	MPC · JPL
709294	2012 XY_{123}	—	September 13, 2007	Mount Lemmon	Mount Lemmon Survey	·	1.3 km	MPC · JPL
709295	2012 XR_{126}	—	September 13, 2007	Mount Lemmon	Mount Lemmon Survey	·	1.8 km	MPC · JPL
709296	2012 XP_{130}	—	December 3, 2012	Mount Lemmon	Mount Lemmon Survey	·	1.8 km	MPC · JPL
709297	2012 XS_{133}	—	November 22, 2012	Nogales	M. Schwartz, P. R. Holvorcem	·	650 m	MPC · JPL
709298	2012 XA_{135}	—	November 20, 2008	Kitt Peak	Spacewatch	·	1.4 km	MPC · JPL
709299	2012 XA_{140}	—	September 14, 2007	Mount Lemmon	Mount Lemmon Survey	·	1.3 km	MPC · JPL
709300	2012 XK_{140}	—	December 21, 2006	Kitt Peak	L. H. Wasserman, M. W. Buie	·	570 m	MPC · JPL

== 709301–709400 ==
back to top

Designation			Discovery			Properties		Ref
Permanent	Provisional	Named after	Date	Site	Discoverer(s)	Category	Diam.	Ref
709301	2012 XN_{141}	—	November 7, 2012	Kitt Peak	Spacewatch	·	1.4 km	MPC · JPL
709302	2012 XX_{141}	—	December 3, 2012	Mount Lemmon	Mount Lemmon Survey	·	950 m	MPC · JPL
709303	2012 XB_{142}	—	December 6, 2012	Mount Lemmon	Mount Lemmon Survey	EUN	1.0 km	MPC · JPL
709304	2012 XL_{142}	—	September 17, 2004	Socorro	LINEAR	NYS	1.1 km	MPC · JPL
709305	2012 XR_{142}	—	December 7, 2012	Haleakala	Pan-STARRS 1	·	1.3 km	MPC · JPL
709306	2012 XD_{147}	—	November 14, 2012	Kitt Peak	Spacewatch	·	1.3 km	MPC · JPL
709307	2012 XG_{150}	—	October 19, 2003	Kitt Peak	Spacewatch	·	1.3 km	MPC · JPL
709308	2012 XH_{150}	—	December 8, 2012	Nogales	M. Schwartz, P. R. Holvorcem	·	1.9 km	MPC · JPL
709309	2012 XJ_{150}	—	November 25, 2012	Kitt Peak	Spacewatch	·	1.2 km	MPC · JPL
709310	2012 XB_{153}	—	January 17, 2009	Kitt Peak	Spacewatch	·	1.8 km	MPC · JPL
709311	2012 XE_{154}	—	December 12, 2012	Mount Lemmon	Mount Lemmon Survey	·	570 m	MPC · JPL
709312	2012 XT_{160}	—	December 13, 2012	Mount Lemmon	Mount Lemmon Survey	(5)	1.1 km	MPC · JPL
709313	2012 XJ_{164}	—	December 12, 2012	Mount Lemmon	Mount Lemmon Survey	HNS	1.0 km	MPC · JPL
709314	2012 XD_{169}	—	November 14, 2012	Kitt Peak	Spacewatch	·	1.1 km	MPC · JPL
709315	2012 XZ_{169}	—	December 12, 2012	Mount Lemmon	Mount Lemmon Survey	·	1.4 km	MPC · JPL
709316	2012 XM_{171}	—	December 11, 2012	Mount Lemmon	Mount Lemmon Survey	·	1.5 km	MPC · JPL
709317	2012 XS_{172}	—	December 12, 2012	Mount Lemmon	Mount Lemmon Survey	·	1.8 km	MPC · JPL
709318	2012 XB_{177}	—	October 12, 2007	Kitt Peak	Spacewatch	AGN	910 m	MPC · JPL
709319	2012 XN_{177}	—	December 8, 2012	Mount Lemmon	Mount Lemmon Survey	·	1.4 km	MPC · JPL
709320	2012 XR_{178}	—	December 8, 2012	Mount Lemmon	Mount Lemmon Survey	·	1.7 km	MPC · JPL
709321	2012 XX_{178}	—	December 8, 2012	Mount Lemmon	Mount Lemmon Survey	·	1.0 km	MPC · JPL
709322	2012 YH	—	October 9, 2007	Kitt Peak	Spacewatch	·	1.7 km	MPC · JPL
709323	2012 YV	—	October 20, 2003	Kitt Peak	Spacewatch	·	1.6 km	MPC · JPL
709324	2012 YF_{9}	—	May 24, 2011	Mount Lemmon	Mount Lemmon Survey	BAR	1.2 km	MPC · JPL
709325	2012 YC_{10}	—	October 9, 2007	Mount Lemmon	Mount Lemmon Survey	·	1.1 km	MPC · JPL
709326	2012 YV_{10}	—	February 11, 2004	Nogales	P. R. Holvorcem, M. Schwartz	·	2.3 km	MPC · JPL
709327	2012 YF_{11}	—	December 23, 2012	Haleakala	Pan-STARRS 1	·	1.3 km	MPC · JPL
709328	2012 YV_{11}	—	March 31, 2009	Kitt Peak	Spacewatch	AGN	920 m	MPC · JPL
709329	2012 YC_{12}	—	August 9, 2007	Kitt Peak	Spacewatch	·	1.4 km	MPC · JPL
709330	2012 YA_{18}	—	December 23, 2012	Haleakala	Pan-STARRS 1	·	1.6 km	MPC · JPL
709331	2012 YA_{19}	—	December 22, 2012	Haleakala	Pan-STARRS 1	URS	2.4 km	MPC · JPL
709332	2012 YQ_{19}	—	December 23, 2012	Haleakala	Pan-STARRS 1	·	1.4 km	MPC · JPL
709333	2012 YV_{19}	—	December 22, 2012	Haleakala	Pan-STARRS 1	·	1.6 km	MPC · JPL
709334	2012 YM_{20}	—	December 23, 2012	Haleakala	Pan-STARRS 1	·	1.2 km	MPC · JPL
709335	2012 YD_{24}	—	August 27, 2011	Haleakala	Pan-STARRS 1	AGN	910 m	MPC · JPL
709336	2013 AU_{3}	—	January 3, 2013	Haleakala	Pan-STARRS 1	JUN	730 m	MPC · JPL
709337	2013 AX_{6}	—	January 3, 2013	Mount Lemmon	Mount Lemmon Survey	·	1.4 km	MPC · JPL
709338	2013 AD_{10}	—	January 4, 2013	Mount Lemmon	Mount Lemmon Survey	(5)	1.2 km	MPC · JPL
709339	2013 AD_{11}	—	September 24, 2011	Haleakala	Pan-STARRS 1	·	2.1 km	MPC · JPL
709340	2013 AJ_{13}	—	January 3, 2013	Mount Lemmon	Mount Lemmon Survey	·	1.5 km	MPC · JPL
709341	2013 AU_{16}	—	September 26, 2011	Haleakala	Pan-STARRS 1	AGN	900 m	MPC · JPL
709342	2013 AV_{20}	—	October 3, 2003	Kitt Peak	Spacewatch	JUN	950 m	MPC · JPL
709343	2013 AO_{21}	—	October 6, 2008	Kitt Peak	Spacewatch	·	760 m	MPC · JPL
709344	2013 AE_{26}	—	December 8, 2012	Catalina	CSS	·	1.2 km	MPC · JPL
709345	2013 AN_{26}	—	March 24, 2014	Haleakala	Pan-STARRS 1	AGN	1.0 km	MPC · JPL
709346	2013 AH_{31}	—	December 13, 2012	Mount Lemmon	Mount Lemmon Survey	·	1.6 km	MPC · JPL
709347	2013 AM_{39}	—	January 10, 2006	Kitt Peak	Spacewatch	·	650 m	MPC · JPL
709348	2013 AR_{43}	—	January 5, 2013	Kitt Peak	Spacewatch	·	2.0 km	MPC · JPL
709349	2013 AX_{45}	—	January 5, 2013	Mount Lemmon	Mount Lemmon Survey	·	2.0 km	MPC · JPL
709350	2013 AY_{45}	—	January 5, 2013	Mount Lemmon	Mount Lemmon Survey	·	1.5 km	MPC · JPL
709351	2013 AR_{46}	—	January 31, 2009	Kitt Peak	Spacewatch	·	2.0 km	MPC · JPL
709352	2013 AA_{47}	—	February 21, 2009	Calar Alto	F. Hormuth	·	1.7 km	MPC · JPL
709353	2013 AZ_{47}	—	October 11, 2007	Catalina	CSS	·	1.4 km	MPC · JPL
709354	2013 AS_{49}	—	December 22, 2012	Haleakala	Pan-STARRS 1	L4	9.5 km	MPC · JPL
709355	2013 AH_{51}	—	January 3, 2013	Haleakala	Pan-STARRS 1	·	1.5 km	MPC · JPL
709356	2013 AK_{54}	—	November 6, 2012	Kitt Peak	Spacewatch	·	1.3 km	MPC · JPL
709357	2013 AU_{61}	—	December 23, 2012	Haleakala	Pan-STARRS 1	·	1.5 km	MPC · JPL
709358	2013 AB_{70}	—	January 3, 2013	Mount Lemmon	Mount Lemmon Survey	·	1.5 km	MPC · JPL
709359	2013 AS_{71}	—	October 27, 2003	Kitt Peak	Spacewatch	MIS	1.9 km	MPC · JPL
709360	2013 AT_{75}	—	January 12, 2013	Bergisch Gladbach	W. Bickel	·	1.1 km	MPC · JPL
709361	2013 AG_{79}	—	June 19, 2006	Mount Lemmon	Mount Lemmon Survey	·	1.6 km	MPC · JPL
709362	2013 AH_{79}	—	September 13, 2007	Catalina	CSS	·	1.5 km	MPC · JPL
709363	2013 AZ_{79}	—	January 5, 2013	Mount Lemmon	Mount Lemmon Survey	THM	1.6 km	MPC · JPL
709364	2013 AY_{80}	—	December 23, 2012	Haleakala	Pan-STARRS 1	·	590 m	MPC · JPL
709365	2013 AZ_{80}	—	November 2, 2007	Mount Lemmon	Mount Lemmon Survey	·	1.5 km	MPC · JPL
709366	2013 AT_{82}	—	February 11, 2004	Kitt Peak	Spacewatch	GEF	1.1 km	MPC · JPL
709367	2013 AD_{84}	—	December 23, 2012	Haleakala	Pan-STARRS 1	WIT	790 m	MPC · JPL
709368	2013 AS_{84}	—	December 23, 2012	Haleakala	Pan-STARRS 1	·	1.1 km	MPC · JPL
709369	2013 AB_{86}	—	July 28, 2011	Haleakala	Pan-STARRS 1	·	1.2 km	MPC · JPL
709370	2013 AO_{86}	—	December 23, 2012	Haleakala	Pan-STARRS 1	·	1.7 km	MPC · JPL
709371	2013 AA_{90}	—	January 15, 2013	ESA OGS	ESA OGS	·	2.5 km	MPC · JPL
709372	2013 AN_{92}	—	September 28, 2003	Kitt Peak	Spacewatch	·	1.2 km	MPC · JPL
709373	2013 AA_{93}	—	January 17, 2004	Haleakala	NEAT	·	1.8 km	MPC · JPL
709374	2013 AQ_{94}	—	February 28, 2009	Kitt Peak	Spacewatch	·	1.9 km	MPC · JPL
709375	2013 AM_{96}	—	January 5, 2013	Kitt Peak	Spacewatch	·	1.6 km	MPC · JPL
709376	2013 AE_{98}	—	September 20, 2003	Kitt Peak	Spacewatch	·	960 m	MPC · JPL
709377	2013 AT_{100}	—	February 14, 2004	Palomar	NEAT	·	2.6 km	MPC · JPL
709378	2013 AV_{102}	—	January 5, 2013	Mount Lemmon	Mount Lemmon Survey	ADE	1.8 km	MPC · JPL
709379	2013 AW_{103}	—	December 31, 2008	Kitt Peak	Spacewatch	·	1.0 km	MPC · JPL
709380	2013 AB_{104}	—	December 17, 2003	Kitt Peak	Spacewatch	·	1.7 km	MPC · JPL
709381	2013 AM_{104}	—	December 23, 2012	Haleakala	Pan-STARRS 1	·	1.4 km	MPC · JPL
709382	2013 AM_{106}	—	October 20, 2011	Mount Lemmon	Mount Lemmon Survey	·	1.5 km	MPC · JPL
709383	2013 AD_{107}	—	October 25, 2003	Kitt Peak	Spacewatch	·	1.1 km	MPC · JPL
709384	2013 AL_{112}	—	January 13, 2013	ESA OGS	ESA OGS	HNS	1.1 km	MPC · JPL
709385	2013 AR_{113}	—	January 13, 2013	Mount Lemmon	Mount Lemmon Survey	·	1.5 km	MPC · JPL
709386	2013 AZ_{113}	—	January 13, 2013	Mount Lemmon	Mount Lemmon Survey	AGN	1.1 km	MPC · JPL
709387	2013 AD_{114}	—	January 20, 2009	Kitt Peak	Spacewatch	·	1.2 km	MPC · JPL
709388	2013 AV_{114}	—	February 20, 2002	Kitt Peak	Spacewatch	·	860 m	MPC · JPL
709389	2013 AD_{118}	—	September 23, 2011	Haleakala	Pan-STARRS 1	·	1.3 km	MPC · JPL
709390	2013 AA_{123}	—	January 15, 2013	Farra d'Isonzo	Piani, F., Pettarin, E.	·	1.9 km	MPC · JPL
709391	2013 AP_{123}	—	January 14, 2013	Oukaïmeden	M. Ory	·	2.9 km	MPC · JPL
709392	2013 AL_{124}	—	September 8, 2011	Kitt Peak	Spacewatch	AGN	980 m	MPC · JPL
709393	2013 AV_{126}	—	January 3, 2013	Mount Lemmon	Mount Lemmon Survey	·	1.4 km	MPC · JPL
709394	2013 AP_{127}	—	January 5, 2013	Mount Lemmon	Mount Lemmon Survey	BRA	1.1 km	MPC · JPL
709395	2013 AC_{129}	—	October 4, 2011	Charleston	R. Holmes	·	1.8 km	MPC · JPL
709396	2013 AE_{134}	—	December 23, 2012	Haleakala	Pan-STARRS 1	L4 · HEK	7.7 km	MPC · JPL
709397	2013 AZ_{135}	—	April 16, 2004	Kitt Peak	Spacewatch	·	1.6 km	MPC · JPL
709398	2013 AP_{138}	—	October 2, 1999	Kitt Peak	Spacewatch	·	1.1 km	MPC · JPL
709399	2013 AG_{139}	—	October 11, 2010	Mount Lemmon	Mount Lemmon Survey	L4	8.1 km	MPC · JPL
709400	2013 AB_{140}	—	October 27, 2003	Kitt Peak	Spacewatch	MAR	880 m	MPC · JPL

== 709401–709500 ==
back to top

Designation			Discovery			Properties		Ref
Permanent	Provisional	Named after	Date	Site	Discoverer(s)	Category	Diam.	Ref
709401	2013 AR_{141}	—	January 4, 2013	Cerro Tololo	DECam	EUN	900 m	MPC · JPL
709402	2013 AL_{142}	—	January 4, 2013	Cerro Tololo	DECam	·	1.8 km	MPC · JPL
709403	2013 AK_{143}	—	September 9, 2007	Kitt Peak	Spacewatch	·	1.1 km	MPC · JPL
709404	2013 AM_{145}	—	January 4, 2013	Cerro Tololo	DECam	·	2.1 km	MPC · JPL
709405	2013 AN_{147}	—	January 4, 2013	Cerro Tololo	DECam	GAL	1.0 km	MPC · JPL
709406	2013 AR_{149}	—	February 9, 2008	Mount Lemmon	Mount Lemmon Survey	EOS	1.2 km	MPC · JPL
709407	2013 AD_{151}	—	August 31, 2011	Haleakala	Pan-STARRS 1	·	1.2 km	MPC · JPL
709408	2013 AM_{152}	—	September 25, 2006	Mount Lemmon	Mount Lemmon Survey	·	1.1 km	MPC · JPL
709409	2013 AK_{153}	—	January 4, 2013	Cerro Tololo	DECam	·	1.3 km	MPC · JPL
709410	2013 AF_{156}	—	August 27, 2011	Haleakala	Pan-STARRS 1	EUN	1.0 km	MPC · JPL
709411	2013 AV_{160}	—	January 4, 2013	Cerro Tololo	DECam	GEF	760 m	MPC · JPL
709412	2013 AV_{164}	—	January 20, 2013	Mount Lemmon	Mount Lemmon Survey	·	1.2 km	MPC · JPL
709413	2013 AX_{167}	—	January 4, 2013	Cerro Tololo	DECam	·	2.4 km	MPC · JPL
709414	2013 AC_{169}	—	September 24, 2011	Haleakala	Pan-STARRS 1	·	2.6 km	MPC · JPL
709415	2013 AZ_{171}	—	October 3, 2011	Mount Lemmon	Mount Lemmon Survey	·	1.3 km	MPC · JPL
709416	2013 AD_{175}	—	January 5, 2013	Cerro Tololo	DECam	L4	5.5 km	MPC · JPL
709417	2013 AU_{176}	—	October 11, 2007	Kitt Peak	Spacewatch	·	1.2 km	MPC · JPL
709418	2013 AN_{182}	—	January 5, 2013	Cerro Tololo	DECam	H	320 m	MPC · JPL
709419	2013 AC_{185}	—	January 10, 2013	Haleakala	Pan-STARRS 1	·	1.3 km	MPC · JPL
709420	2013 AM_{185}	—	November 26, 2012	Mount Lemmon	Mount Lemmon Survey	·	1.1 km	MPC · JPL
709421	2013 AQ_{185}	—	September 26, 2011	Mount Lemmon	Mount Lemmon Survey	AST	1.5 km	MPC · JPL
709422	2013 AT_{185}	—	January 10, 2013	Haleakala	Pan-STARRS 1	·	1.4 km	MPC · JPL
709423	2013 AM_{186}	—	September 27, 2011	Mount Lemmon	Mount Lemmon Survey	·	1.2 km	MPC · JPL
709424	2013 AS_{186}	—	January 9, 2013	Kitt Peak	Spacewatch	HOF	1.9 km	MPC · JPL
709425	2013 AP_{187}	—	January 10, 2013	Haleakala	Pan-STARRS 1	·	830 m	MPC · JPL
709426	2013 AU_{188}	—	January 4, 2013	Kitt Peak	Spacewatch	ADE	2.0 km	MPC · JPL
709427	2013 AT_{189}	—	August 2, 2016	Haleakala	Pan-STARRS 1	·	2.2 km	MPC · JPL
709428	2013 AF_{191}	—	May 18, 2015	Haleakala	Pan-STARRS 1	·	1.9 km	MPC · JPL
709429	2013 AW_{192}	—	January 10, 2013	Haleakala	Pan-STARRS 1	L4	8.5 km	MPC · JPL
709430	2013 AC_{193}	—	February 20, 2014	Haleakala	Pan-STARRS 1	T_{j} (2.99) · 3:2 · (6124)	5.5 km	MPC · JPL
709431	2013 AQ_{196}	—	January 10, 2013	Haleakala	Pan-STARRS 1	·	960 m	MPC · JPL
709432	2013 AV_{196}	—	January 10, 2013	Haleakala	Pan-STARRS 1	L4	6.5 km	MPC · JPL
709433	2013 AZ_{196}	—	January 9, 2013	Mount Lemmon	Mount Lemmon Survey	GEF	910 m	MPC · JPL
709434	2013 AE_{198}	—	January 15, 2013	ESA OGS	ESA OGS	·	1.5 km	MPC · JPL
709435	2013 AF_{198}	—	November 15, 1999	Kitt Peak	Spacewatch	·	1.2 km	MPC · JPL
709436	2013 AG_{198}	—	January 10, 2013	Haleakala	Pan-STARRS 1	·	1.5 km	MPC · JPL
709437	2013 AN_{198}	—	January 4, 2013	Kitt Peak	Spacewatch	(13314)	1.7 km	MPC · JPL
709438	2013 AC_{199}	—	January 10, 2013	Haleakala	Pan-STARRS 1	AGN	970 m	MPC · JPL
709439	2013 AK_{199}	—	January 8, 2013	Mount Lemmon	Mount Lemmon Survey	·	1.4 km	MPC · JPL
709440	2013 AR_{199}	—	January 3, 2013	Mount Lemmon	Mount Lemmon Survey	·	1.1 km	MPC · JPL
709441	2013 AV_{199}	—	January 9, 2013	Kitt Peak	Spacewatch	HOF	1.9 km	MPC · JPL
709442	2013 AE_{200}	—	January 10, 2013	Haleakala	Pan-STARRS 1	·	1.5 km	MPC · JPL
709443	2013 AN_{202}	—	January 10, 2013	Haleakala	Pan-STARRS 1	3:2	4.7 km	MPC · JPL
709444	2013 AS_{203}	—	January 5, 2013	Mount Lemmon	Mount Lemmon Survey	KOR	1.1 km	MPC · JPL
709445	2013 AL_{206}	—	January 10, 2013	Mount Lemmon	Mount Lemmon Survey	·	1.3 km	MPC · JPL
709446	2013 AN_{206}	—	January 9, 2013	Kitt Peak	Spacewatch	BRA	1.1 km	MPC · JPL
709447	2013 AU_{207}	—	October 24, 2011	Mount Lemmon	Mount Lemmon Survey	·	1.5 km	MPC · JPL
709448	2013 AM_{210}	—	January 10, 2013	Haleakala	Pan-STARRS 1	HOF	1.9 km	MPC · JPL
709449	2013 BR_{2}	—	January 16, 2013	Mount Lemmon	Mount Lemmon Survey	·	1.1 km	MPC · JPL
709450	2013 BZ_{2}	—	June 7, 2011	Mount Lemmon	Mount Lemmon Survey	H	350 m	MPC · JPL
709451	2013 BJ_{3}	—	January 4, 2013	Kitt Peak	Spacewatch	·	1.3 km	MPC · JPL
709452	2013 BX_{3}	—	December 17, 2012	ESA OGS	ESA OGS	·	1.4 km	MPC · JPL
709453	2013 BF_{5}	—	January 16, 2013	Mount Lemmon	Mount Lemmon Survey	·	2.6 km	MPC · JPL
709454	2013 BN_{5}	—	February 20, 2009	Kitt Peak	Spacewatch	·	1.7 km	MPC · JPL
709455	2013 BC_{6}	—	January 16, 2013	Mount Lemmon	Mount Lemmon Survey	·	1.9 km	MPC · JPL
709456	2013 BR_{13}	—	January 20, 2009	Mount Lemmon	Mount Lemmon Survey	·	1.8 km	MPC · JPL
709457	2013 BT_{14}	—	January 9, 2013	Kitt Peak	Spacewatch	·	1.1 km	MPC · JPL
709458	2013 BL_{17}	—	October 17, 2010	Mount Lemmon	Mount Lemmon Survey	L4 · ERY	6.8 km	MPC · JPL
709459	2013 BV_{20}	—	January 1, 2009	Mount Lemmon	Mount Lemmon Survey	·	1.1 km	MPC · JPL
709460	2013 BC_{23}	—	January 20, 2009	Catalina	CSS	(194)	1.9 km	MPC · JPL
709461	2013 BR_{28}	—	December 21, 2008	Kitt Peak	Spacewatch	·	870 m	MPC · JPL
709462	2013 BW_{30}	—	January 25, 2009	Kitt Peak	Spacewatch	·	1.4 km	MPC · JPL
709463	2013 BA_{31}	—	January 16, 2013	Haleakala	Pan-STARRS 1	·	1.7 km	MPC · JPL
709464	2013 BU_{31}	—	October 19, 2006	Kitt Peak	Deep Ecliptic Survey	AGN	1.1 km	MPC · JPL
709465	2013 BA_{33}	—	September 24, 2011	Haleakala	Pan-STARRS 1	·	2.6 km	MPC · JPL
709466	2013 BD_{36}	—	November 5, 2007	Kitt Peak	Spacewatch	·	1.3 km	MPC · JPL
709467	2013 BX_{38}	—	January 18, 2013	Kitt Peak	Spacewatch	·	1.7 km	MPC · JPL
709468	2013 BD_{42}	—	January 18, 2013	Mount Lemmon	Mount Lemmon Survey	AGN	1.0 km	MPC · JPL
709469	2013 BH_{42}	—	January 7, 2013	Kitt Peak	Spacewatch	·	2.1 km	MPC · JPL
709470	2013 BV_{42}	—	September 4, 2007	Mount Lemmon	Mount Lemmon Survey	·	1.6 km	MPC · JPL
709471	2013 BS_{43}	—	March 3, 2009	Mount Lemmon	Mount Lemmon Survey	·	1.0 km	MPC · JPL
709472	2013 BG_{46}	—	November 20, 2003	Kitt Peak	Spacewatch	·	1.4 km	MPC · JPL
709473	2013 BA_{50}	—	November 28, 2010	Mount Lemmon	Mount Lemmon Survey	L4	7.3 km	MPC · JPL
709474	2013 BG_{52}	—	August 30, 2011	Haleakala	Pan-STARRS 1	·	1.5 km	MPC · JPL
709475	2013 BZ_{55}	—	October 13, 2010	Mount Lemmon	Mount Lemmon Survey	L4	6.8 km	MPC · JPL
709476	2013 BE_{57}	—	September 26, 2011	Haleakala	Pan-STARRS 1	AST	1.3 km	MPC · JPL
709477	2013 BL_{57}	—	September 26, 2006	Mount Lemmon	Mount Lemmon Survey	·	1.4 km	MPC · JPL
709478	2013 BZ_{57}	—	October 1, 2011	Kitt Peak	Spacewatch	PAD	1.5 km	MPC · JPL
709479	2013 BH_{63}	—	September 14, 2007	Catalina	CSS	JUN	930 m	MPC · JPL
709480	2013 BK_{63}	—	January 18, 2013	Kitt Peak	Spacewatch	·	1.7 km	MPC · JPL
709481	2013 BZ_{64}	—	January 7, 2006	Kitt Peak	Spacewatch	·	550 m	MPC · JPL
709482	2013 BA_{66}	—	January 30, 2009	Mount Lemmon	Mount Lemmon Survey	·	1.5 km	MPC · JPL
709483	2013 BZ_{68}	—	February 4, 2009	Mount Lemmon	Mount Lemmon Survey	·	1.5 km	MPC · JPL
709484	2013 BC_{69}	—	January 20, 2013	Kitt Peak	Spacewatch	(5)	1.1 km	MPC · JPL
709485	2013 BW_{70}	—	April 17, 2004	Palomar	NEAT	·	2.0 km	MPC · JPL
709486	2013 BQ_{73}	—	January 22, 2013	Haleakala	Pan-STARRS 1	H	470 m	MPC · JPL
709487	2013 BL_{76}	—	October 7, 2012	Haleakala	Pan-STARRS 1	centaur	40 km	MPC · JPL
709488	2013 BZ_{78}	—	September 4, 2011	Haleakala	Pan-STARRS 1	·	1.4 km	MPC · JPL
709489	2013 BE_{81}	—	November 19, 2007	Kitt Peak	Spacewatch	·	1.7 km	MPC · JPL
709490	2013 BP_{81}	—	January 17, 2013	Haleakala	Pan-STARRS 1	HOF	2.1 km	MPC · JPL
709491	2013 BS_{81}	—	September 26, 2011	Haleakala	Pan-STARRS 1	·	1.3 km	MPC · JPL
709492	2013 BO_{85}	—	January 20, 2013	Kitt Peak	Spacewatch	HNS	1.1 km	MPC · JPL
709493	2013 BK_{87}	—	January 22, 2013	Mount Lemmon	Mount Lemmon Survey	·	2.2 km	MPC · JPL
709494	2013 BD_{88}	—	May 30, 2014	Haleakala	Pan-STARRS 1	MAR	810 m	MPC · JPL
709495	2013 BT_{89}	—	January 18, 2013	Haleakala	Pan-STARRS 1	L4	9.4 km	MPC · JPL
709496	2013 BV_{89}	—	June 17, 2015	Haleakala	Pan-STARRS 1	·	2.0 km	MPC · JPL
709497	2013 BU_{92}	—	January 18, 2013	Haleakala	Pan-STARRS 1	·	840 m	MPC · JPL
709498	2013 BW_{92}	—	January 18, 2013	Mount Lemmon	Mount Lemmon Survey	·	1.4 km	MPC · JPL
709499	2013 BE_{93}	—	January 19, 2013	Mount Lemmon	Mount Lemmon Survey	·	470 m	MPC · JPL
709500	2013 BF_{94}	—	January 17, 2013	Haleakala	Pan-STARRS 1	·	1.4 km	MPC · JPL

== 709501–709600 ==
back to top

Designation			Discovery			Properties		Ref
Permanent	Provisional	Named after	Date	Site	Discoverer(s)	Category	Diam.	Ref
709501	2013 BT_{94}	—	January 17, 2013	Haleakala	Pan-STARRS 1	·	1.6 km	MPC · JPL
709502	2013 BM_{96}	—	January 20, 2013	Mount Lemmon	Mount Lemmon Survey	·	1.2 km	MPC · JPL
709503	2013 BU_{96}	—	January 17, 2013	Haleakala	Pan-STARRS 1	HOF	2.1 km	MPC · JPL
709504	2013 BX_{97}	—	January 16, 2013	Mount Lemmon	Mount Lemmon Survey	·	1.5 km	MPC · JPL
709505	2013 BY_{99}	—	January 17, 2013	Haleakala	Pan-STARRS 1	HOF	1.8 km	MPC · JPL
709506	2013 BB_{100}	—	January 22, 2013	Kitt Peak	Spacewatch	·	490 m	MPC · JPL
709507	2013 BO_{103}	—	January 20, 2013	Kitt Peak	Spacewatch	·	2.1 km	MPC · JPL
709508	2013 BE_{105}	—	January 17, 2013	Haleakala	Pan-STARRS 1	·	1.7 km	MPC · JPL
709509	2013 CP_{1}	—	October 15, 2007	Mount Lemmon	Mount Lemmon Survey	·	1.4 km	MPC · JPL
709510	2013 CT_{6}	—	July 31, 2011	Mayhill-ISON	L. Elenin	·	1.4 km	MPC · JPL
709511	2013 CB_{8}	—	January 5, 2006	Kitt Peak	Spacewatch	·	560 m	MPC · JPL
709512	2013 CA_{9}	—	January 10, 2013	Haleakala	Pan-STARRS 1	·	1.7 km	MPC · JPL
709513	2013 CB_{10}	—	August 19, 2006	Anderson Mesa	LONEOS	·	2.1 km	MPC · JPL
709514	2013 CP_{13}	—	February 1, 2013	Kitt Peak	Spacewatch	PAD	1.3 km	MPC · JPL
709515	2013 CR_{13}	—	February 1, 2013	Kitt Peak	Spacewatch	·	1.4 km	MPC · JPL
709516	2013 CS_{13}	—	January 10, 2008	Mount Lemmon	Mount Lemmon Survey	KOR	1.0 km	MPC · JPL
709517	2013 CD_{14}	—	February 22, 2009	Kitt Peak	Spacewatch	·	1.1 km	MPC · JPL
709518	2013 CC_{18}	—	February 1, 2013	Kitt Peak	Spacewatch	·	1.2 km	MPC · JPL
709519	2013 CG_{23}	—	January 4, 2013	Kitt Peak	Spacewatch	HNS	1.3 km	MPC · JPL
709520	2013 CW_{23}	—	January 4, 2013	Kitt Peak	Spacewatch	·	1.4 km	MPC · JPL
709521	2013 CA_{25}	—	March 21, 2009	Mount Lemmon	Mount Lemmon Survey	·	1.5 km	MPC · JPL
709522	2013 CQ_{28}	—	February 6, 2013	Kitt Peak	Spacewatch	·	540 m	MPC · JPL
709523	2013 CV_{29}	—	February 2, 2008	Mount Lemmon	Mount Lemmon Survey	·	1.5 km	MPC · JPL
709524	2013 CJ_{35}	—	November 18, 2007	Mount Lemmon	Mount Lemmon Survey	·	1.3 km	MPC · JPL
709525	2013 CY_{35}	—	January 21, 2013	Haleakala	Pan-STARRS 1	H	390 m	MPC · JPL
709526	2013 CQ_{39}	—	February 1, 2013	Kitt Peak	Spacewatch	·	1.4 km	MPC · JPL
709527	2013 CW_{39}	—	February 1, 2013	Kitt Peak	Spacewatch	·	1.7 km	MPC · JPL
709528	2013 CK_{44}	—	January 22, 2013	Kitt Peak	Spacewatch	·	1.8 km	MPC · JPL
709529	2013 CQ_{44}	—	April 20, 2009	Mount Lemmon	Mount Lemmon Survey	·	1.4 km	MPC · JPL
709530	2013 CZ_{48}	—	February 24, 2009	Kitt Peak	Spacewatch	AEO	950 m	MPC · JPL
709531	2013 CF_{55}	—	February 9, 2013	Haleakala	Pan-STARRS 1	·	1.3 km	MPC · JPL
709532	2013 CT_{55}	—	February 8, 2013	Haleakala	Pan-STARRS 1	BRA	1.1 km	MPC · JPL
709533	2013 CU_{55}	—	September 21, 2003	Palomar	NEAT	MAR	970 m	MPC · JPL
709534	2013 CR_{56}	—	November 15, 2007	Mount Lemmon	Mount Lemmon Survey	·	1.5 km	MPC · JPL
709535	2013 CZ_{56}	—	January 18, 2013	Haleakala	Pan-STARRS 1	·	1.5 km	MPC · JPL
709536	2013 CJ_{57}	—	December 15, 2007	Kitt Peak	Spacewatch	·	1.5 km	MPC · JPL
709537	2013 CT_{59}	—	August 20, 2011	Haleakala	Pan-STARRS 1	(13314)	1.8 km	MPC · JPL
709538	2013 CR_{63}	—	February 8, 2013	Haleakala	Pan-STARRS 1	·	1.4 km	MPC · JPL
709539	2013 CR_{64}	—	September 20, 2011	Haleakala	Pan-STARRS 1	MAR	930 m	MPC · JPL
709540	2013 CF_{65}	—	February 8, 2013	Haleakala	Pan-STARRS 1	·	1.4 km	MPC · JPL
709541	2013 CN_{65}	—	January 9, 2013	Kitt Peak	Spacewatch	·	1.3 km	MPC · JPL
709542	2013 CG_{67}	—	October 25, 2003	Kitt Peak	Spacewatch	·	1.2 km	MPC · JPL
709543	2013 CF_{70}	—	February 1, 2013	Mount Lemmon	Mount Lemmon Survey	·	550 m	MPC · JPL
709544	2013 CT_{70}	—	January 10, 2013	Haleakala	Pan-STARRS 1	EUN	1.0 km	MPC · JPL
709545	2013 CV_{72}	—	February 3, 2013	Haleakala	Pan-STARRS 1	·	1.5 km	MPC · JPL
709546	2013 CD_{74}	—	April 11, 2010	Kitt Peak	Spacewatch	·	590 m	MPC · JPL
709547	2013 CE_{76}	—	September 27, 2011	Mount Lemmon	Mount Lemmon Survey	·	1.6 km	MPC · JPL
709548	2013 CC_{77}	—	November 9, 2007	Kitt Peak	Spacewatch	·	1.9 km	MPC · JPL
709549	2013 CZ_{77}	—	February 8, 2013	Haleakala	Pan-STARRS 1	·	1.8 km	MPC · JPL
709550	2013 CG_{78}	—	February 8, 2013	Haleakala	Pan-STARRS 1	EUN	940 m	MPC · JPL
709551	2013 CW_{79}	—	July 19, 2006	Mauna Kea	P. A. Wiegert, D. Subasinghe	MRX	940 m	MPC · JPL
709552	2013 CA_{80}	—	February 20, 2009	Kitt Peak	Spacewatch	·	1.7 km	MPC · JPL
709553	2013 CD_{86}	—	December 23, 2012	Haleakala	Pan-STARRS 1	·	1.9 km	MPC · JPL
709554	2013 CF_{89}	—	February 13, 2013	Haleakala	Pan-STARRS 1	H	400 m	MPC · JPL
709555	2013 CU_{89}	—	February 6, 2013	Kitt Peak	Spacewatch	·	1.2 km	MPC · JPL
709556	2013 CZ_{92}	—	October 20, 2011	Mount Lemmon	Mount Lemmon Survey	·	1.2 km	MPC · JPL
709557	2013 CZ_{95}	—	February 8, 2013	Haleakala	Pan-STARRS 1	·	1.7 km	MPC · JPL
709558	2013 CJ_{99}	—	February 8, 2013	Haleakala	Pan-STARRS 1	·	1.5 km	MPC · JPL
709559	2013 CD_{102}	—	November 30, 2005	Mount Lemmon	Mount Lemmon Survey	·	670 m	MPC · JPL
709560	2013 CD_{104}	—	January 20, 2013	Mount Lemmon	Mount Lemmon Survey	(5)	810 m	MPC · JPL
709561	2013 CT_{104}	—	February 9, 2013	Haleakala	Pan-STARRS 1	·	1.5 km	MPC · JPL
709562	2013 CF_{105}	—	October 23, 2011	Mount Lemmon	Mount Lemmon Survey	HOF	2.0 km	MPC · JPL
709563	2013 CF_{106}	—	July 14, 2001	Palomar	NEAT	·	1.9 km	MPC · JPL
709564	2013 CH_{106}	—	February 9, 2013	Haleakala	Pan-STARRS 1	HOF	2.4 km	MPC · JPL
709565	2013 CF_{109}	—	March 19, 2009	Kitt Peak	Spacewatch	·	1.8 km	MPC · JPL
709566	2013 CA_{111}	—	February 9, 2013	Haleakala	Pan-STARRS 1	·	600 m	MPC · JPL
709567	2013 CT_{113}	—	January 20, 2013	Kitt Peak	Spacewatch	·	1.7 km	MPC · JPL
709568	2013 CS_{114}	—	January 30, 2006	Kitt Peak	Spacewatch	·	680 m	MPC · JPL
709569	2013 CT_{116}	—	April 8, 2003	Kitt Peak	Spacewatch	·	620 m	MPC · JPL
709570	2013 CE_{117}	—	February 13, 2013	ESA OGS	ESA OGS	·	2.1 km	MPC · JPL
709571	2013 CR_{117}	—	October 19, 2011	Kitt Peak	Spacewatch	·	1.6 km	MPC · JPL
709572	2013 CL_{119}	—	February 8, 2013	Oukaïmeden	C. Rinner	·	650 m	MPC · JPL
709573	2013 CE_{125}	—	December 31, 2007	Mount Lemmon	Mount Lemmon Survey	·	1.8 km	MPC · JPL
709574	2013 CS_{126}	—	November 20, 2007	Mount Lemmon	Mount Lemmon Survey	·	1.3 km	MPC · JPL
709575	2013 CA_{129}	—	February 14, 2013	Kitt Peak	Spacewatch	H	430 m	MPC · JPL
709576	2013 CB_{133}	—	January 31, 2013	Kitt Peak	Spacewatch	WIT	900 m	MPC · JPL
709577	2013 CJ_{133}	—	January 11, 2008	Kitt Peak	Spacewatch	PAD	1.4 km	MPC · JPL
709578	2013 CN_{136}	—	November 5, 2007	Mount Lemmon	Mount Lemmon Survey	ADE	1.8 km	MPC · JPL
709579	2013 CA_{138}	—	January 31, 2013	Kitt Peak	Spacewatch	·	510 m	MPC · JPL
709580	2013 CS_{139}	—	February 14, 2013	Kitt Peak	Spacewatch	·	1.3 km	MPC · JPL
709581	2013 CY_{139}	—	October 23, 2011	Mount Lemmon	Mount Lemmon Survey	·	1.3 km	MPC · JPL
709582	2013 CW_{140}	—	February 14, 2013	Kitt Peak	Spacewatch	·	1.0 km	MPC · JPL
709583	2013 CN_{141}	—	February 14, 2013	Kitt Peak	Spacewatch	·	1.8 km	MPC · JPL
709584	2013 CS_{141}	—	February 14, 2013	Kitt Peak	Spacewatch	·	1.4 km	MPC · JPL
709585	2013 CW_{141}	—	February 14, 2013	Kitt Peak	Spacewatch	·	1.3 km	MPC · JPL
709586	2013 CA_{143}	—	December 4, 2008	Kitt Peak	Spacewatch	·	870 m	MPC · JPL
709587	2013 CU_{143}	—	August 9, 2005	Cerro Tololo	Deep Ecliptic Survey	·	2.1 km	MPC · JPL
709588	2013 CA_{147}	—	October 19, 2011	Kitt Peak	Spacewatch	·	1.5 km	MPC · JPL
709589	2013 CD_{150}	—	October 26, 2011	Haleakala	Pan-STARRS 1	·	1.5 km	MPC · JPL
709590	2013 CS_{151}	—	February 7, 2013	Kitt Peak	Spacewatch	PAD	1.5 km	MPC · JPL
709591	2013 CR_{152}	—	September 23, 2011	Haleakala	Pan-STARRS 1	MRX	870 m	MPC · JPL
709592	2013 CK_{153}	—	February 14, 2013	Haleakala	Pan-STARRS 1	·	470 m	MPC · JPL
709593	2013 CE_{155}	—	October 9, 2007	Kitt Peak	Spacewatch	·	1.2 km	MPC · JPL
709594	2013 CE_{156}	—	October 27, 2011	Mount Lemmon	Mount Lemmon Survey	·	1.5 km	MPC · JPL
709595	2013 CJ_{159}	—	February 14, 2013	Haleakala	Pan-STARRS 1	·	2.0 km	MPC · JPL
709596	2013 CG_{160}	—	January 27, 2007	Mount Lemmon	Mount Lemmon Survey	THM	2.4 km	MPC · JPL
709597	2013 CA_{163}	—	February 14, 2013	Kitt Peak	Spacewatch	(194)	920 m	MPC · JPL
709598	2013 CF_{164}	—	February 14, 2013	Kitt Peak	Spacewatch	·	1.2 km	MPC · JPL
709599	2013 CS_{166}	—	May 4, 2009	Mount Lemmon	Mount Lemmon Survey	AGN	1.1 km	MPC · JPL
709600	2013 CN_{167}	—	January 1, 2008	Kitt Peak	Spacewatch	·	1.5 km	MPC · JPL

== 709601–709700 ==
back to top

Designation			Discovery			Properties		Ref
Permanent	Provisional	Named after	Date	Site	Discoverer(s)	Category	Diam.	Ref
709601	2013 CF_{172}	—	September 19, 2006	Kitt Peak	Spacewatch	·	1.9 km	MPC · JPL
709602	2013 CZ_{176}	—	March 17, 2009	Kitt Peak	Spacewatch	ADE	1.7 km	MPC · JPL
709603	2013 CL_{180}	—	January 8, 2013	Kitt Peak	Spacewatch	·	1.8 km	MPC · JPL
709604	2013 CY_{180}	—	February 11, 2013	Nogales	M. Schwartz, P. R. Holvorcem	·	590 m	MPC · JPL
709605	2013 CH_{183}	—	February 5, 2013	Kitt Peak	Spacewatch	·	1.7 km	MPC · JPL
709606	2013 CK_{183}	—	February 11, 2004	Kitt Peak	Spacewatch	EUN	1 km	MPC · JPL
709607	2013 CY_{183}	—	February 6, 2013	Nogales	M. Schwartz, P. R. Holvorcem	·	1.8 km	MPC · JPL
709608	2013 CT_{185}	—	March 17, 2009	Kitt Peak	Spacewatch	·	1.6 km	MPC · JPL
709609	2013 CN_{186}	—	February 8, 2008	Mount Lemmon	Mount Lemmon Survey	·	1.9 km	MPC · JPL
709610	2013 CC_{187}	—	September 19, 2007	Kitt Peak	Spacewatch	(5)	980 m	MPC · JPL
709611	2013 CU_{193}	—	December 28, 2011	Kitt Peak	Spacewatch	L4	8.0 km	MPC · JPL
709612	2013 CG_{194}	—	February 9, 2013	Haleakala	Pan-STARRS 1	·	1.8 km	MPC · JPL
709613	2013 CG_{195}	—	October 3, 2006	Mount Lemmon	Mount Lemmon Survey	KOR	1.1 km	MPC · JPL
709614	2013 CK_{197}	—	January 10, 2013	Haleakala	Pan-STARRS 1	(2076)	640 m	MPC · JPL
709615	2013 CA_{202}	—	February 9, 2013	Haleakala	Pan-STARRS 1	·	1.4 km	MPC · JPL
709616	2013 CB_{202}	—	February 9, 2013	Haleakala	Pan-STARRS 1	·	2.1 km	MPC · JPL
709617	2013 CZ_{202}	—	February 6, 2013	Kitt Peak	Spacewatch	MAS	470 m	MPC · JPL
709618	2013 CH_{203}	—	February 9, 2013	Haleakala	Pan-STARRS 1	·	1.8 km	MPC · JPL
709619	2013 CP_{203}	—	December 4, 2007	Kitt Peak	Spacewatch	HOF	2.8 km	MPC · JPL
709620	2013 CK_{205}	—	April 21, 2004	Kitt Peak	Spacewatch	·	1.6 km	MPC · JPL
709621	2013 CC_{210}	—	September 23, 2011	Kitt Peak	Spacewatch	·	1.8 km	MPC · JPL
709622	2013 CJ_{210}	—	January 18, 2013	Mount Lemmon	Mount Lemmon Survey	·	2.1 km	MPC · JPL
709623	2013 CF_{211}	—	September 21, 2011	Haleakala	Pan-STARRS 1	·	990 m	MPC · JPL
709624	2013 CP_{213}	—	February 8, 2013	Haleakala	Pan-STARRS 1	HOF	2.1 km	MPC · JPL
709625	2013 CD_{214}	—	September 28, 2011	Bergisch Gladbach	W. Bickel	·	1.6 km	MPC · JPL
709626	2013 CU_{214}	—	November 15, 2006	Kitt Peak	Spacewatch	·	1.7 km	MPC · JPL
709627	2013 CJ_{215}	—	March 3, 2009	Kitt Peak	Spacewatch	·	1.8 km	MPC · JPL
709628	2013 CL_{216}	—	February 8, 2013	Haleakala	Pan-STARRS 1	AGN	990 m	MPC · JPL
709629	2013 CB_{217}	—	January 13, 2008	Kitt Peak	Spacewatch	·	1.6 km	MPC · JPL
709630	2013 CR_{217}	—	September 16, 2006	Kitt Peak	Spacewatch	·	1.5 km	MPC · JPL
709631	2013 CS_{218}	—	January 1, 2008	Kitt Peak	Spacewatch	·	1.7 km	MPC · JPL
709632	2013 CC_{219}	—	February 9, 2013	Haleakala	Pan-STARRS 1	EOS	1.2 km	MPC · JPL
709633	2013 CB_{220}	—	February 9, 2013	Haleakala	Pan-STARRS 1	·	1.4 km	MPC · JPL
709634	2013 CG_{222}	—	February 14, 2013	Haleakala	Pan-STARRS 1	3:2	4.7 km	MPC · JPL
709635	2013 CD_{225}	—	October 26, 2011	Haleakala	Pan-STARRS 1	·	1.5 km	MPC · JPL
709636	2013 CU_{225}	—	October 24, 2011	Haleakala	Pan-STARRS 1	·	1.4 km	MPC · JPL
709637	2013 CX_{225}	—	February 5, 2013	Kitt Peak	Spacewatch	·	1.4 km	MPC · JPL
709638	2013 CM_{232}	—	February 14, 2013	Haleakala	Pan-STARRS 1	·	750 m	MPC · JPL
709639	2013 CS_{235}	—	February 8, 2013	Haleakala	Pan-STARRS 1	·	570 m	MPC · JPL
709640	2013 CU_{235}	—	February 3, 2013	Haleakala	Pan-STARRS 1	L4	8.2 km	MPC · JPL
709641	2013 CJ_{236}	—	February 3, 2013	Haleakala	Pan-STARRS 1	·	1.4 km	MPC · JPL
709642	2013 CL_{238}	—	February 9, 2013	Haleakala	Pan-STARRS 1	NAE	1.5 km	MPC · JPL
709643	2013 CH_{240}	—	February 2, 2013	Kitt Peak	Spacewatch	·	1.8 km	MPC · JPL
709644	2013 CM_{240}	—	February 5, 2013	Kitt Peak	Spacewatch	PHO	750 m	MPC · JPL
709645	2013 CZ_{240}	—	February 14, 2013	Catalina	CSS	PHO	670 m	MPC · JPL
709646	2013 CP_{244}	—	February 14, 2013	Haleakala	Pan-STARRS 1	·	1.7 km	MPC · JPL
709647	2013 CB_{245}	—	February 3, 2013	Haleakala	Pan-STARRS 1	AGN	890 m	MPC · JPL
709648	2013 CC_{245}	—	February 9, 2013	Haleakala	Pan-STARRS 1	HOF	2.0 km	MPC · JPL
709649	2013 CX_{245}	—	February 9, 2013	Haleakala	Pan-STARRS 1	·	1.7 km	MPC · JPL
709650	2013 CP_{246}	—	February 3, 2013	Haleakala	Pan-STARRS 1	·	1.2 km	MPC · JPL
709651	2013 CL_{247}	—	February 13, 2013	Haleakala	Pan-STARRS 1	·	1.8 km	MPC · JPL
709652	2013 CN_{247}	—	February 3, 2013	Haleakala	Pan-STARRS 1	·	1.4 km	MPC · JPL
709653	2013 CZ_{248}	—	February 5, 2013	Mount Lemmon	Mount Lemmon Survey	·	1.3 km	MPC · JPL
709654	2013 CC_{249}	—	February 3, 2013	Haleakala	Pan-STARRS 1	L4	6.1 km	MPC · JPL
709655	2013 CW_{249}	—	February 15, 2013	Haleakala	Pan-STARRS 1	·	1.2 km	MPC · JPL
709656	2013 CN_{250}	—	February 15, 2013	Haleakala	Pan-STARRS 1	·	1.6 km	MPC · JPL
709657	2013 CQ_{253}	—	February 13, 2013	Haleakala	Pan-STARRS 1	L4	6.5 km	MPC · JPL
709658	2013 CV_{253}	—	February 15, 2013	Haleakala	Pan-STARRS 1	·	2.6 km	MPC · JPL
709659	2013 CJ_{254}	—	February 15, 2013	Haleakala	Pan-STARRS 1	MAR	810 m	MPC · JPL
709660	2013 CM_{254}	—	February 5, 2013	Mount Lemmon	Mount Lemmon Survey	L4	6.9 km	MPC · JPL
709661	2013 CG_{256}	—	February 15, 2013	Haleakala	Pan-STARRS 1	URS	2.3 km	MPC · JPL
709662	2013 CY_{257}	—	April 4, 2008	Mount Lemmon	Mount Lemmon Survey	·	2.2 km	MPC · JPL
709663	2013 CR_{262}	—	February 14, 2013	Haleakala	Pan-STARRS 1	KOR	1.1 km	MPC · JPL
709664	2013 CW_{262}	—	February 14, 2013	Mount Lemmon	Mount Lemmon Survey	·	1.4 km	MPC · JPL
709665	2013 CW_{263}	—	February 15, 2013	Haleakala	Pan-STARRS 1	·	2.3 km	MPC · JPL
709666	2013 DU_{3}	—	January 8, 2013	Oukaïmeden	M. Ory	AEO	1.1 km	MPC · JPL
709667	2013 DS_{5}	—	January 17, 2013	Mount Lemmon	Mount Lemmon Survey	·	1.6 km	MPC · JPL
709668	2013 DW_{10}	—	February 17, 2013	Mount Lemmon	Mount Lemmon Survey	·	2.2 km	MPC · JPL
709669	2013 DX_{13}	—	December 31, 2011	Mount Lemmon	Mount Lemmon Survey	L4 · HEK	7.5 km	MPC · JPL
709670	2013 DL_{14}	—	September 18, 2006	Kitt Peak	Spacewatch	AGN	950 m	MPC · JPL
709671	2013 DL_{20}	—	February 17, 2013	Mount Lemmon	Mount Lemmon Survey	·	510 m	MPC · JPL
709672	2013 DF_{21}	—	February 17, 2013	Kitt Peak	Spacewatch	·	1.7 km	MPC · JPL
709673	2013 DO_{21}	—	February 16, 2013	Mount Lemmon	Mount Lemmon Survey	·	2.0 km	MPC · JPL
709674	2013 DL_{23}	—	February 17, 2013	Mount Lemmon	Mount Lemmon Survey	·	830 m	MPC · JPL
709675	2013 DF_{24}	—	February 17, 2013	Mount Lemmon	Mount Lemmon Survey	·	570 m	MPC · JPL
709676	2013 EZ	—	October 10, 2002	Palomar	NEAT	·	1.7 km	MPC · JPL
709677	2013 EH_{1}	—	September 11, 2010	Mount Lemmon	Mount Lemmon Survey	BRA	1.3 km	MPC · JPL
709678	2013 EQ_{2}	—	October 23, 2003	Anderson Mesa	LONEOS	KON	2.3 km	MPC · JPL
709679	2013 EQ_{6}	—	January 9, 2013	Mount Lemmon	Mount Lemmon Survey	·	2.0 km	MPC · JPL
709680	2013 EE_{8}	—	September 30, 2006	Mount Lemmon	Mount Lemmon Survey	AEO	1.1 km	MPC · JPL
709681	2013 EM_{8}	—	November 21, 2005	Kitt Peak	Spacewatch	·	610 m	MPC · JPL
709682	2013 EV_{15}	—	March 3, 2013	Kitt Peak	Spacewatch	MRX	880 m	MPC · JPL
709683	2013 EW_{16}	—	March 3, 2013	Haleakala	Pan-STARRS 1	·	600 m	MPC · JPL
709684	2013 EZ_{16}	—	January 18, 2013	Mount Lemmon	Mount Lemmon Survey	·	540 m	MPC · JPL
709685	2013 EL_{21}	—	January 16, 2008	Kitt Peak	Spacewatch	·	2.1 km	MPC · JPL
709686	2013 EJ_{22}	—	December 17, 2007	Mount Lemmon	Mount Lemmon Survey	·	1.6 km	MPC · JPL
709687	2013 EZ_{24}	—	March 6, 2013	Haleakala	Pan-STARRS 1	·	840 m	MPC · JPL
709688	2013 EV_{25}	—	October 24, 2011	Haleakala	Pan-STARRS 1	·	1.7 km	MPC · JPL
709689	2013 EN_{26}	—	March 18, 2009	Kitt Peak	Spacewatch	(5)	910 m	MPC · JPL
709690	2013 EQ_{26}	—	October 21, 2006	Mount Lemmon	Mount Lemmon Survey	AGN	1.1 km	MPC · JPL
709691	2013 EF_{34}	—	February 11, 2013	Catalina	CSS	H	440 m	MPC · JPL
709692	2013 EK_{36}	—	March 9, 2008	Kitt Peak	Spacewatch	·	1.5 km	MPC · JPL
709693	2013 EA_{37}	—	March 8, 2013	Haleakala	Pan-STARRS 1	·	600 m	MPC · JPL
709694	2013 EL_{39}	—	March 8, 2013	Haleakala	Pan-STARRS 1	·	1.3 km	MPC · JPL
709695	2013 EX_{40}	—	March 11, 2013	Mount Lemmon	Mount Lemmon Survey	·	1.6 km	MPC · JPL
709696	2013 EF_{45}	—	March 6, 2013	Haleakala	Pan-STARRS 1	RAF	980 m	MPC · JPL
709697	2013 EG_{45}	—	March 6, 2013	Haleakala	Pan-STARRS 1	·	1.4 km	MPC · JPL
709698	2013 EL_{46}	—	September 28, 2011	Kitt Peak	Spacewatch	·	930 m	MPC · JPL
709699	2013 EN_{49}	—	March 2, 2008	Kitt Peak	Spacewatch	·	1.5 km	MPC · JPL
709700	2013 EB_{54}	—	September 15, 2007	Mount Lemmon	Mount Lemmon Survey	·	610 m	MPC · JPL

== 709701–709800 ==
back to top

Designation			Discovery			Properties		Ref
Permanent	Provisional	Named after	Date	Site	Discoverer(s)	Category	Diam.	Ref
709701	2013 EG_{56}	—	March 8, 2013	Haleakala	Pan-STARRS 1	·	1.3 km	MPC · JPL
709702	2013 ED_{60}	—	March 8, 2013	Haleakala	Pan-STARRS 1	3:2	3.5 km	MPC · JPL
709703	2013 EL_{62}	—	October 25, 2011	Haleakala	Pan-STARRS 1	GEF	1.1 km	MPC · JPL
709704	2013 EQ_{72}	—	February 7, 2008	Kitt Peak	Spacewatch	KOR	1.4 km	MPC · JPL
709705	2013 EZ_{72}	—	February 19, 2013	Kitt Peak	Spacewatch	·	1.9 km	MPC · JPL
709706	2013 EM_{74}	—	February 14, 2013	Haleakala	Pan-STARRS 1	·	1.3 km	MPC · JPL
709707	2013 EV_{75}	—	March 8, 2013	Haleakala	Pan-STARRS 1	·	530 m	MPC · JPL
709708	2013 EN_{76}	—	March 8, 2013	Haleakala	Pan-STARRS 1	·	570 m	MPC · JPL
709709	2013 EY_{77}	—	February 8, 2008	Kitt Peak	Spacewatch	·	1.6 km	MPC · JPL
709710	2013 EV_{78}	—	March 8, 2013	Haleakala	Pan-STARRS 1	KOR	1.1 km	MPC · JPL
709711	2013 EY_{82}	—	April 1, 2003	Apache Point	SDSS Collaboration	·	1.4 km	MPC · JPL
709712	2013 EF_{84}	—	March 8, 2013	Haleakala	Pan-STARRS 1	·	540 m	MPC · JPL
709713	2013 ED_{85}	—	February 2, 2008	Kitt Peak	Spacewatch	MRX	910 m	MPC · JPL
709714	2013 EV_{88}	—	June 28, 2011	Mount Lemmon	Mount Lemmon Survey	·	1.6 km	MPC · JPL
709715	2013 EB_{89}	—	April 18, 2009	Kitt Peak	Spacewatch	·	1.5 km	MPC · JPL
709716	2013 EK_{90}	—	September 14, 2006	Bergisch Gladbach	W. Bickel	(18466)	2.7 km	MPC · JPL
709717	2013 EB_{95}	—	September 17, 2010	Mount Lemmon	Mount Lemmon Survey	·	1.6 km	MPC · JPL
709718	2013 EB_{96}	—	March 8, 2013	Haleakala	Pan-STARRS 1	KOR	1.0 km	MPC · JPL
709719	2013 EF_{97}	—	March 7, 2013	Mount Lemmon	Mount Lemmon Survey	KOR	1.3 km	MPC · JPL
709720	2013 ET_{98}	—	March 8, 2013	Haleakala	Pan-STARRS 1	·	1.6 km	MPC · JPL
709721	2013 EX_{98}	—	March 8, 2013	Haleakala	Pan-STARRS 1	·	1.3 km	MPC · JPL
709722	2013 EG_{99}	—	March 8, 2013	Haleakala	Pan-STARRS 1	·	1.6 km	MPC · JPL
709723	2013 EY_{99}	—	March 8, 2013	Haleakala	Pan-STARRS 1	·	820 m	MPC · JPL
709724	2013 EK_{100}	—	March 28, 2008	Mount Lemmon	Mount Lemmon Survey	·	1.5 km	MPC · JPL
709725	2013 EA_{103}	—	January 18, 2004	Palomar	NEAT	·	1.4 km	MPC · JPL
709726	2013 EF_{106}	—	March 13, 2013	Kitt Peak	Spacewatch	·	1.5 km	MPC · JPL
709727	2013 EC_{112}	—	April 22, 2009	Mount Lemmon	Mount Lemmon Survey	·	1.2 km	MPC · JPL
709728	2013 EE_{116}	—	March 12, 2013	Kitt Peak	Spacewatch	·	1.3 km	MPC · JPL
709729	2013 EM_{117}	—	August 30, 2005	Kitt Peak	Spacewatch	KOR	1.5 km	MPC · JPL
709730	2013 EP_{120}	—	February 12, 2008	Mount Lemmon	Mount Lemmon Survey	·	1.7 km	MPC · JPL
709731	2013 EQ_{121}	—	February 10, 2008	Kitt Peak	Spacewatch	·	1.6 km	MPC · JPL
709732	2013 EM_{126}	—	March 25, 2003	Palomar	NEAT	·	650 m	MPC · JPL
709733	2013 ES_{131}	—	February 26, 2008	Mount Lemmon	Mount Lemmon Survey	KOR	1.1 km	MPC · JPL
709734	2013 EO_{132}	—	March 19, 2013	Haleakala	Pan-STARRS 1	KOR	1.2 km	MPC · JPL
709735	2013 EB_{134}	—	November 1, 2010	Mount Lemmon	Mount Lemmon Survey	·	1.9 km	MPC · JPL
709736	2013 EF_{136}	—	April 13, 2013	Haleakala	Pan-STARRS 1	·	2.0 km	MPC · JPL
709737	2013 EH_{136}	—	November 1, 2005	Kitt Peak	Spacewatch	KOR	1.1 km	MPC · JPL
709738	2013 EY_{137}	—	August 29, 2006	Kitt Peak	Spacewatch	·	1.4 km	MPC · JPL
709739	2013 EN_{139}	—	January 10, 2013	Haleakala	Pan-STARRS 1	·	1.5 km	MPC · JPL
709740	2013 ES_{147}	—	March 5, 2013	Haleakala	Pan-STARRS 1	THM	1.5 km	MPC · JPL
709741	2013 EJ_{148}	—	April 10, 2013	Haleakala	Pan-STARRS 1	·	1.6 km	MPC · JPL
709742	2013 EK_{149}	—	March 18, 2013	Mount Lemmon	Mount Lemmon Survey	BRA	1.2 km	MPC · JPL
709743	2013 EL_{151}	—	September 17, 2010	Mount Lemmon	Mount Lemmon Survey	·	1.3 km	MPC · JPL
709744	2013 EO_{153}	—	July 25, 2014	Haleakala	Pan-STARRS 1	·	550 m	MPC · JPL
709745	2013 EP_{155}	—	March 8, 2013	Haleakala	Pan-STARRS 1	·	520 m	MPC · JPL
709746	2013 ET_{155}	—	January 19, 2008	Mount Lemmon	Mount Lemmon Survey	·	1.7 km	MPC · JPL
709747	2013 EF_{158}	—	March 6, 2008	Mount Lemmon	Mount Lemmon Survey	KOR	1.3 km	MPC · JPL
709748	2013 EM_{163}	—	March 7, 2013	Siding Spring	SSS	·	2.5 km	MPC · JPL
709749	2013 EX_{167}	—	March 5, 2013	Haleakala	Pan-STARRS 1	HOF	1.9 km	MPC · JPL
709750	2013 EY_{167}	—	March 15, 2013	Mount Lemmon	Mount Lemmon Survey	V	470 m	MPC · JPL
709751	2013 ER_{168}	—	March 12, 2013	Mount Lemmon	Mount Lemmon Survey	·	650 m	MPC · JPL
709752	2013 EB_{171}	—	March 13, 2013	Kitt Peak	Spacewatch	KOR	1.1 km	MPC · JPL
709753	2013 EX_{171}	—	March 6, 2013	Haleakala	Pan-STARRS 1	·	2.0 km	MPC · JPL
709754	2013 EV_{172}	—	March 8, 2013	Haleakala	Pan-STARRS 1	·	1.4 km	MPC · JPL
709755	2013 EX_{173}	—	March 5, 2013	Mount Lemmon	Mount Lemmon Survey	L4	6.1 km	MPC · JPL
709756	2013 EY_{174}	—	March 7, 2013	Nogales	M. Schwartz, P. R. Holvorcem	·	2.5 km	MPC · JPL
709757	2013 EJ_{177}	—	March 13, 2013	Haleakala	Pan-STARRS 1	·	720 m	MPC · JPL
709758	2013 EP_{177}	—	March 4, 2013	Haleakala	Pan-STARRS 1	·	2.1 km	MPC · JPL
709759	2013 EQ_{177}	—	March 8, 2013	Haleakala	Pan-STARRS 1	·	1.2 km	MPC · JPL
709760	2013 EZ_{177}	—	March 5, 2013	Mount Lemmon	Mount Lemmon Survey	HYG	2.0 km	MPC · JPL
709761	2013 EM_{181}	—	March 13, 2013	Haleakala	Pan-STARRS 1	·	1.2 km	MPC · JPL
709762	2013 ES_{181}	—	March 5, 2013	Haleakala	Pan-STARRS 1	·	1.4 km	MPC · JPL
709763	2013 EW_{181}	—	March 5, 2013	Mount Lemmon	Mount Lemmon Survey	·	530 m	MPC · JPL
709764	2013 EV_{184}	—	March 13, 2013	Mount Lemmon	Mount Lemmon Survey	·	940 m	MPC · JPL
709765	2013 EA_{185}	—	March 4, 2013	Haleakala	Pan-STARRS 1	·	1.5 km	MPC · JPL
709766	2013 FU_{1}	—	October 25, 2011	Haleakala	Pan-STARRS 1	·	1.8 km	MPC · JPL
709767	2013 FY_{4}	—	March 17, 2013	Kitt Peak	Spacewatch	·	1.8 km	MPC · JPL
709768	2013 FM_{6}	—	March 18, 2013	Palomar	Palomar Transient Factory	·	1.7 km	MPC · JPL
709769	2013 FU_{8}	—	March 9, 2013	Elena Remote	Oreshko, A.	·	1.9 km	MPC · JPL
709770	2013 FC_{10}	—	September 11, 2007	Kitt Peak	Spacewatch	·	700 m	MPC · JPL
709771	2013 FH_{10}	—	October 1, 2005	Mount Lemmon	Mount Lemmon Survey	·	2.0 km	MPC · JPL
709772	2013 FG_{11}	—	March 17, 2013	Palomar	Palomar Transient Factory	·	660 m	MPC · JPL
709773	2013 FS_{29}	—	February 9, 2008	Mount Lemmon	Mount Lemmon Survey	AEO	1.0 km	MPC · JPL
709774	2013 FQ_{33}	—	March 19, 2013	Haleakala	Pan-STARRS 1	·	690 m	MPC · JPL
709775	2013 FU_{33}	—	March 31, 2013	Palomar	Palomar Transient Factory	PHO	720 m	MPC · JPL
709776	2013 FJ_{36}	—	March 19, 2013	Haleakala	Pan-STARRS 1	KOR	1.1 km	MPC · JPL
709777	2013 FP_{36}	—	March 19, 2013	Haleakala	Pan-STARRS 1	·	510 m	MPC · JPL
709778	2013 FU_{39}	—	March 16, 2013	Kitt Peak	Spacewatch	EOS	1.4 km	MPC · JPL
709779	2013 FD_{40}	—	March 19, 2013	Haleakala	Pan-STARRS 1	·	1.5 km	MPC · JPL
709780	2013 GF_{1}	—	March 24, 2013	Mount Lemmon	Mount Lemmon Survey	H	450 m	MPC · JPL
709781	2013 GM_{2}	—	March 5, 2013	Haleakala	Pan-STARRS 1	H	470 m	MPC · JPL
709782	2013 GQ_{2}	—	April 1, 2013	Mount Lemmon	Mount Lemmon Survey	·	1.6 km	MPC · JPL
709783	2013 GG_{6}	—	October 10, 2010	Mount Lemmon	Mount Lemmon Survey	·	1.5 km	MPC · JPL
709784	2013 GP_{7}	—	March 5, 2013	Haleakala	Pan-STARRS 1	·	1.4 km	MPC · JPL
709785	2013 GU_{11}	—	April 2, 2013	Mount Lemmon	Mount Lemmon Survey	·	1.0 km	MPC · JPL
709786	2013 GH_{13}	—	February 13, 2004	Kitt Peak	Spacewatch	ADE	2.2 km	MPC · JPL
709787	2013 GU_{13}	—	February 14, 2013	Catalina	CSS	·	2.7 km	MPC · JPL
709788	2013 GA_{14}	—	February 5, 2013	Kitt Peak	Spacewatch	EUN	1.1 km	MPC · JPL
709789	2013 GG_{19}	—	April 5, 2013	Palomar	Palomar Transient Factory	·	1.3 km	MPC · JPL
709790	2013 GQ_{23}	—	March 23, 2013	Kitt Peak	Spacewatch	·	2.1 km	MPC · JPL
709791	2013 GT_{23}	—	April 2, 2013	Mount Lemmon	Mount Lemmon Survey	·	1.5 km	MPC · JPL
709792	2013 GV_{23}	—	June 5, 1997	Mauna Kea	Veillet, C.	EOS	2.2 km	MPC · JPL
709793	2013 GL_{31}	—	April 7, 2013	Mount Lemmon	Mount Lemmon Survey	·	2.1 km	MPC · JPL
709794	2013 GS_{32}	—	April 7, 2013	Haleakala	Pan-STARRS 1	·	1.8 km	MPC · JPL
709795	2013 GH_{33}	—	March 18, 2013	Kitt Peak	Spacewatch	·	1.7 km	MPC · JPL
709796	2013 GZ_{44}	—	April 9, 2013	Haleakala	Pan-STARRS 1	·	1.7 km	MPC · JPL
709797	2013 GY_{46}	—	October 18, 2006	Kitt Peak	Spacewatch	PAD	1.4 km	MPC · JPL
709798	2013 GM_{47}	—	March 6, 2013	Haleakala	Pan-STARRS 1	H	410 m	MPC · JPL
709799	2013 GZ_{47}	—	March 23, 2003	Apache Point	SDSS Collaboration	·	550 m	MPC · JPL
709800	2013 GQ_{49}	—	March 18, 2013	Kitt Peak	Spacewatch	·	1.6 km	MPC · JPL

== 709801–709900 ==
back to top

Designation			Discovery			Properties		Ref
Permanent	Provisional	Named after	Date	Site	Discoverer(s)	Category	Diam.	Ref
709801	2013 GD_{60}	—	March 31, 2013	Mount Lemmon	Mount Lemmon Survey	KOR	1.1 km	MPC · JPL
709802	2013 GY_{60}	—	April 7, 2013	Mount Lemmon	Mount Lemmon Survey	·	580 m	MPC · JPL
709803	2013 GF_{61}	—	September 12, 2007	Kitt Peak	Spacewatch	·	630 m	MPC · JPL
709804	2013 GK_{63}	—	March 19, 2010	Kitt Peak	Spacewatch	·	640 m	MPC · JPL
709805	2013 GT_{64}	—	April 10, 2013	Mount Lemmon	Mount Lemmon Survey	·	1.5 km	MPC · JPL
709806	2013 GM_{66}	—	July 30, 2008	Kitt Peak	Spacewatch	·	3.1 km	MPC · JPL
709807	2013 GR_{69}	—	November 1, 2010	Wildberg	R. Apitzsch	·	2.4 km	MPC · JPL
709808	2013 GO_{74}	—	April 8, 2013	Palomar	Palomar Transient Factory	·	1.8 km	MPC · JPL
709809	2013 GT_{80}	—	April 10, 2013	Kitt Peak	Spacewatch	·	2.2 km	MPC · JPL
709810	2013 GX_{81}	—	April 11, 2013	Kitt Peak	Spacewatch	·	610 m	MPC · JPL
709811	2013 GP_{87}	—	January 30, 2012	Mount Lemmon	Mount Lemmon Survey	·	2.3 km	MPC · JPL
709812	2013 GE_{95}	—	March 16, 1999	Bergisch Gladbach	W. Bickel	·	630 m	MPC · JPL
709813	2013 GJ_{96}	—	March 16, 2013	Mount Lemmon	Mount Lemmon Survey	·	1.4 km	MPC · JPL
709814	2013 GK_{96}	—	March 15, 2013	Kitt Peak	Spacewatch	GEF	1.0 km	MPC · JPL
709815	2013 GQ_{101}	—	March 31, 2013	Mount Lemmon	Mount Lemmon Survey	·	600 m	MPC · JPL
709816	2013 GJ_{104}	—	April 3, 2013	Mount Lemmon	Mount Lemmon Survey	·	720 m	MPC · JPL
709817	2013 GE_{116}	—	March 14, 2013	Kitt Peak	Spacewatch	EOS	1.6 km	MPC · JPL
709818	2013 GN_{116}	—	April 5, 2013	Palomar	Palomar Transient Factory	·	1.9 km	MPC · JPL
709819	2013 GC_{119}	—	April 7, 2013	Mount Lemmon	Mount Lemmon Survey	KOR	930 m	MPC · JPL
709820	2013 GR_{119}	—	September 25, 2006	Kitt Peak	Spacewatch	·	1.2 km	MPC · JPL
709821	2013 GY_{120}	—	May 20, 2006	Kitt Peak	Spacewatch	NYS	660 m	MPC · JPL
709822	2013 GB_{121}	—	March 17, 2013	Kitt Peak	Spacewatch	·	1.9 km	MPC · JPL
709823	2013 GS_{122}	—	January 10, 2007	Mount Lemmon	Mount Lemmon Survey	·	1.6 km	MPC · JPL
709824	2013 GR_{125}	—	April 11, 2013	Kitt Peak	Spacewatch	EUN	1.2 km	MPC · JPL
709825	2013 GC_{128}	—	April 1, 2003	Apache Point	SDSS Collaboration	·	2.0 km	MPC · JPL
709826	2013 GQ_{128}	—	February 15, 2013	ESA OGS	ESA OGS	·	1.8 km	MPC · JPL
709827	2013 GU_{131}	—	February 14, 2013	Catalina	CSS	·	2.0 km	MPC · JPL
709828	2013 GA_{132}	—	July 29, 2005	Palomar	NEAT	·	2.3 km	MPC · JPL
709829	2013 GL_{133}	—	March 13, 2013	Haleakala	Pan-STARRS 1	·	2.5 km	MPC · JPL
709830	2013 GW_{135}	—	April 15, 2013	Calar Alto	F. Hormuth	·	580 m	MPC · JPL
709831	2013 GA_{140}	—	January 18, 2009	Kitt Peak	Spacewatch	·	710 m	MPC · JPL
709832	2013 GB_{140}	—	January 19, 2012	Haleakala	Pan-STARRS 1	EOS	1.8 km	MPC · JPL
709833	2013 GE_{140}	—	April 4, 2013	Haleakala	Pan-STARRS 1	·	1.2 km	MPC · JPL
709834	2013 GF_{141}	—	April 15, 2013	Haleakala	Pan-STARRS 1	·	2.6 km	MPC · JPL
709835	2013 GZ_{141}	—	April 7, 2013	Mount Lemmon	Mount Lemmon Survey	·	1.5 km	MPC · JPL
709836	2013 GH_{143}	—	October 28, 2014	Haleakala	Pan-STARRS 1	V	470 m	MPC · JPL
709837	2013 GM_{149}	—	April 8, 2013	Mount Lemmon	Mount Lemmon Survey	KOR	1.1 km	MPC · JPL
709838	2013 GR_{151}	—	April 13, 2013	Haleakala	Pan-STARRS 1	NYS	820 m	MPC · JPL
709839	2013 GW_{151}	—	April 10, 2013	Haleakala	Pan-STARRS 1	·	510 m	MPC · JPL
709840	2013 GY_{151}	—	April 13, 2013	Haleakala	Pan-STARRS 1	PHO	610 m	MPC · JPL
709841	2013 GL_{152}	—	April 2, 2013	Mount Lemmon	Mount Lemmon Survey	(2076)	640 m	MPC · JPL
709842	2013 GK_{154}	—	April 8, 2013	Mount Lemmon	Mount Lemmon Survey	·	1.7 km	MPC · JPL
709843	2013 GK_{155}	—	April 10, 2013	Haleakala	Pan-STARRS 1	·	1.5 km	MPC · JPL
709844 Komoniecki	2013 GS_{155}	Komoniecki	April 3, 2013	Tincana	Zolnowski, M., Kusiak, M.	EOS	1.8 km	MPC · JPL
709845	2013 GH_{156}	—	April 13, 2013	Haleakala	Pan-STARRS 1	EOS	1.4 km	MPC · JPL
709846	2013 GW_{156}	—	April 6, 2013	Mount Lemmon	Mount Lemmon Survey	KOR	1.0 km	MPC · JPL
709847	2013 GO_{157}	—	April 15, 2013	Haleakala	Pan-STARRS 1	·	1.5 km	MPC · JPL
709848	2013 GD_{159}	—	April 12, 2013	Haleakala	Pan-STARRS 1	·	1.5 km	MPC · JPL
709849	2013 GE_{159}	—	April 8, 2013	Mount Lemmon	Mount Lemmon Survey	·	600 m	MPC · JPL
709850	2013 GP_{159}	—	April 8, 2013	Mount Lemmon	Mount Lemmon Survey	·	2.1 km	MPC · JPL
709851	2013 GM_{160}	—	April 4, 2013	Haleakala	Pan-STARRS 1	·	1.7 km	MPC · JPL
709852	2013 GC_{161}	—	July 29, 2008	Mount Lemmon	Mount Lemmon Survey	·	3.5 km	MPC · JPL
709853	2013 GK_{162}	—	April 14, 2013	Mount Lemmon	Mount Lemmon Survey	EOS	1.5 km	MPC · JPL
709854	2013 GN_{162}	—	April 7, 2013	Mount Lemmon	Mount Lemmon Survey	KOR	950 m	MPC · JPL
709855	2013 GQ_{162}	—	April 13, 2013	Haleakala	Pan-STARRS 1	EOS	1.5 km	MPC · JPL
709856	2013 GB_{164}	—	April 9, 2013	Haleakala	Pan-STARRS 1	·	1.4 km	MPC · JPL
709857	2013 GO_{164}	—	April 10, 2013	Haleakala	Pan-STARRS 1	·	1.4 km	MPC · JPL
709858	2013 GW_{165}	—	April 15, 2013	Haleakala	Pan-STARRS 1	·	1.3 km	MPC · JPL
709859	2013 GU_{167}	—	April 10, 2013	Haleakala	Pan-STARRS 1	·	1.3 km	MPC · JPL
709860	2013 GU_{169}	—	April 13, 2013	La Silla	La Silla	·	2.2 km	MPC · JPL
709861	2013 HV	—	April 16, 2013	Kitt Peak	Spacewatch	·	1.6 km	MPC · JPL
709862	2013 HZ	—	December 29, 2011	Mount Lemmon	Mount Lemmon Survey	·	1.9 km	MPC · JPL
709863	2013 HS_{1}	—	April 16, 2013	Nogales	M. Schwartz, P. R. Holvorcem	·	1.8 km	MPC · JPL
709864	2013 HQ_{4}	—	March 13, 2013	Palomar	Palomar Transient Factory	EUN	1.1 km	MPC · JPL
709865	2013 HK_{16}	—	April 7, 2013	Kitt Peak	Spacewatch	·	1.1 km	MPC · JPL
709866	2013 HN_{18}	—	November 3, 2010	Kitt Peak	Spacewatch	·	2.5 km	MPC · JPL
709867	2013 HB_{24}	—	February 22, 2001	Kitt Peak	Spacewatch	·	400 m	MPC · JPL
709868	2013 HA_{25}	—	April 30, 2013	Mount Lemmon	Mount Lemmon Survey	·	1.7 km	MPC · JPL
709869	2013 HJ_{27}	—	March 14, 2013	Palomar	Palomar Transient Factory	BRA	1.7 km	MPC · JPL
709870	2013 HX_{32}	—	May 4, 2013	Haleakala	Pan-STARRS 1	·	1.3 km	MPC · JPL
709871	2013 HL_{33}	—	April 9, 2013	Haleakala	Pan-STARRS 1	·	740 m	MPC · JPL
709872	2013 HD_{34}	—	April 16, 2013	Cerro Tololo	DECam	·	730 m	MPC · JPL
709873	2013 HJ_{35}	—	April 16, 2013	Cerro Tololo	DECam	·	500 m	MPC · JPL
709874	2013 HZ_{36}	—	April 9, 2013	Haleakala	Pan-STARRS 1	·	1.9 km	MPC · JPL
709875	2013 HV_{38}	—	September 17, 2003	Kitt Peak	Spacewatch	·	830 m	MPC · JPL
709876	2013 HB_{39}	—	March 11, 2007	Mount Lemmon	Mount Lemmon Survey	·	1.9 km	MPC · JPL
709877	2013 HH_{39}	—	October 12, 2010	Mount Lemmon	Mount Lemmon Survey	·	1.6 km	MPC · JPL
709878	2013 HV_{42}	—	October 12, 2010	Mount Lemmon	Mount Lemmon Survey	EOS	1.2 km	MPC · JPL
709879	2013 HS_{45}	—	April 16, 2013	Cerro Tololo	DECam	·	1.6 km	MPC · JPL
709880	2013 HZ_{52}	—	April 9, 2013	Haleakala	Pan-STARRS 1	·	1.3 km	MPC · JPL
709881	2013 HH_{55}	—	October 13, 2010	Mount Lemmon	Mount Lemmon Survey	·	2.5 km	MPC · JPL
709882	2013 HX_{56}	—	April 16, 2013	Cerro Tololo	DECam	·	440 m	MPC · JPL
709883	2013 HJ_{61}	—	April 9, 2013	Haleakala	Pan-STARRS 1	HOF	1.8 km	MPC · JPL
709884	2013 HF_{73}	—	January 2, 2012	Kitt Peak	Spacewatch	AGN	870 m	MPC · JPL
709885	2013 HE_{75}	—	April 9, 2013	Haleakala	Pan-STARRS 1	EOS	1.4 km	MPC · JPL
709886	2013 HV_{75}	—	January 18, 2012	Mount Lemmon	Mount Lemmon Survey	·	1.1 km	MPC · JPL
709887	2013 HH_{77}	—	August 10, 2007	Kitt Peak	Spacewatch	·	510 m	MPC · JPL
709888	2013 HK_{78}	—	January 7, 2002	Kitt Peak	Spacewatch	·	1.4 km	MPC · JPL
709889	2013 HD_{81}	—	November 30, 2003	Kitt Peak	Spacewatch	·	940 m	MPC · JPL
709890	2013 HE_{82}	—	April 9, 2013	Haleakala	Pan-STARRS 1	·	1.4 km	MPC · JPL
709891	2013 HK_{84}	—	December 25, 2011	Kitt Peak	Spacewatch	KOR	910 m	MPC · JPL
709892	2013 HW_{84}	—	October 27, 2011	Mount Lemmon	Mount Lemmon Survey	·	740 m	MPC · JPL
709893	2013 HX_{84}	—	October 11, 2010	Mount Lemmon	Mount Lemmon Survey	EOS	1.5 km	MPC · JPL
709894	2013 HD_{90}	—	April 15, 2013	Mount Lemmon	Mount Lemmon Survey	KOR	1.1 km	MPC · JPL
709895	2013 HN_{91}	—	November 19, 2006	Kitt Peak	Spacewatch	·	1.3 km	MPC · JPL
709896	2013 HM_{92}	—	April 9, 2013	Haleakala	Pan-STARRS 1	·	1.8 km	MPC · JPL
709897	2013 HW_{94}	—	February 9, 2008	Mount Lemmon	Mount Lemmon Survey	·	1.3 km	MPC · JPL
709898	2013 HR_{99}	—	April 9, 2013	Haleakala	Pan-STARRS 1	PHO	640 m	MPC · JPL
709899	2013 HT_{102}	—	April 9, 2013	Haleakala	Pan-STARRS 1	·	1.3 km	MPC · JPL
709900	2013 HS_{110}	—	October 2, 2010	Kitt Peak	Spacewatch	·	1.4 km	MPC · JPL

== 709901–710000 ==
back to top

Designation			Discovery			Properties		Ref
Permanent	Provisional	Named after	Date	Site	Discoverer(s)	Category	Diam.	Ref
709901	2013 HU_{115}	—	April 10, 2013	Haleakala	Pan-STARRS 1	·	420 m	MPC · JPL
709902	2013 HS_{117}	—	October 17, 2010	Mount Lemmon	Mount Lemmon Survey	VER	1.8 km	MPC · JPL
709903	2013 HX_{119}	—	May 3, 2013	Haleakala	Pan-STARRS 1	HOF	2.0 km	MPC · JPL
709904	2013 HY_{121}	—	April 10, 2013	Haleakala	Pan-STARRS 1	·	1.5 km	MPC · JPL
709905	2013 HR_{126}	—	April 17, 2013	Cerro Tololo	DECam	·	730 m	MPC · JPL
709906	2013 HP_{139}	—	September 19, 2006	Kitt Peak	Spacewatch	·	1.2 km	MPC · JPL
709907	2013 HS_{141}	—	October 2, 2006	Kitt Peak	Spacewatch	HNS	840 m	MPC · JPL
709908	2013 HN_{142}	—	May 3, 2013	Haleakala	Pan-STARRS 1	KOR	940 m	MPC · JPL
709909	2013 HP_{143}	—	October 21, 2003	Kitt Peak	Spacewatch	·	990 m	MPC · JPL
709910	2013 HL_{144}	—	April 16, 2013	Cerro Tololo	DECam	·	1.8 km	MPC · JPL
709911	2013 HO_{144}	—	November 30, 2005	Socorro	LINEAR	·	2.0 km	MPC · JPL
709912	2013 HJ_{146}	—	October 1, 2005	Mount Lemmon	Mount Lemmon Survey	·	1.5 km	MPC · JPL
709913	2013 HC_{148}	—	May 3, 2013	Haleakala	Pan-STARRS 1	·	1.7 km	MPC · JPL
709914	2013 HM_{149}	—	August 23, 2004	Kitt Peak	Spacewatch	·	1.8 km	MPC · JPL
709915	2013 HX_{155}	—	May 12, 2013	Mount Lemmon	Mount Lemmon Survey	·	1.4 km	MPC · JPL
709916	2013 HC_{158}	—	April 19, 2013	Haleakala	Pan-STARRS 1	EOS	1.4 km	MPC · JPL
709917	2013 HE_{158}	—	April 21, 2013	Haleakala	Pan-STARRS 1	·	2.3 km	MPC · JPL
709918	2013 HV_{158}	—	April 16, 2013	Haleakala	Pan-STARRS 1	·	760 m	MPC · JPL
709919	2013 HH_{160}	—	December 4, 2015	Haleakala	Pan-STARRS 1	JUN	910 m	MPC · JPL
709920	2013 HU_{161}	—	April 21, 2013	Mount Lemmon	Mount Lemmon Survey	·	2.3 km	MPC · JPL
709921	2013 HK_{163}	—	April 16, 2013	Haleakala	Pan-STARRS 1	·	550 m	MPC · JPL
709922	2013 HY_{165}	—	April 16, 2013	Haleakala	Pan-STARRS 1	·	2.3 km	MPC · JPL
709923	2013 JQ_{5}	—	May 4, 2013	Palomar	Palomar Transient Factory	·	2.2 km	MPC · JPL
709924	2013 JA_{11}	—	December 22, 2008	Mount Lemmon	Mount Lemmon Survey	·	950 m	MPC · JPL
709925	2013 JM_{13}	—	May 8, 2013	Haleakala	Pan-STARRS 1	·	1.4 km	MPC · JPL
709926	2013 JR_{13}	—	May 8, 2013	Haleakala	Pan-STARRS 1	·	2.0 km	MPC · JPL
709927	2013 JY_{13}	—	January 25, 2009	Kitt Peak	Spacewatch	·	680 m	MPC · JPL
709928	2013 JH_{18}	—	August 22, 2003	Palomar	NEAT	·	2.5 km	MPC · JPL
709929	2013 JN_{19}	—	March 18, 2002	Kitt Peak	Spacewatch	·	720 m	MPC · JPL
709930	2013 JY_{19}	—	November 6, 2010	Kitt Peak	Spacewatch	·	1.9 km	MPC · JPL
709931	2013 JB_{20}	—	May 8, 2013	Haleakala	Pan-STARRS 1	·	1.7 km	MPC · JPL
709932	2013 JG_{20}	—	May 8, 2013	Haleakala	Pan-STARRS 1	EMA	2.4 km	MPC · JPL
709933	2013 JQ_{26}	—	November 9, 2004	Mauna Kea	P. A. Wiegert, A. Papadimos	·	1.6 km	MPC · JPL
709934	2013 JA_{27}	—	March 13, 2013	Palomar	Palomar Transient Factory	·	2.4 km	MPC · JPL
709935	2013 JH_{29}	—	January 19, 2007	Mauna Kea	P. A. Wiegert	·	1.5 km	MPC · JPL
709936	2013 JZ_{29}	—	March 10, 2007	Kitt Peak	Spacewatch	·	1.8 km	MPC · JPL
709937	2013 JE_{31}	—	April 18, 2013	Mount Lemmon	Mount Lemmon Survey	·	1.2 km	MPC · JPL
709938	2013 JG_{32}	—	May 2, 2013	Haleakala	Pan-STARRS 1	EOS	1.6 km	MPC · JPL
709939	2013 JG_{38}	—	May 6, 2002	Palomar	NEAT	·	3.0 km	MPC · JPL
709940	2013 JM_{38}	—	May 10, 2013	Kitt Peak	Spacewatch	·	2.3 km	MPC · JPL
709941	2013 JJ_{41}	—	May 10, 2013	Kitt Peak	Spacewatch	·	1.8 km	MPC · JPL
709942	2013 JH_{42}	—	November 3, 2010	Mount Lemmon	Mount Lemmon Survey	BRA	1.6 km	MPC · JPL
709943	2013 JB_{43}	—	November 11, 2010	Kitt Peak	Spacewatch	·	2.8 km	MPC · JPL
709944	2013 JK_{47}	—	May 12, 2013	Mount Lemmon	Mount Lemmon Survey	·	1.5 km	MPC · JPL
709945	2013 JB_{50}	—	December 29, 2011	Kitt Peak	Spacewatch	·	830 m	MPC · JPL
709946	2013 JG_{50}	—	May 1, 2013	Mount Lemmon	Mount Lemmon Survey	·	1.7 km	MPC · JPL
709947	2013 JC_{53}	—	May 5, 2013	Haleakala	Pan-STARRS 1	·	2.1 km	MPC · JPL
709948	2013 JV_{53}	—	April 7, 2013	Nogales	M. Schwartz, P. R. Holvorcem	BRA	1.6 km	MPC · JPL
709949	2013 JJ_{57}	—	January 26, 2012	Mount Lemmon	Mount Lemmon Survey	KOR	1.0 km	MPC · JPL
709950	2013 JG_{61}	—	April 15, 2013	Haleakala	Pan-STARRS 1	·	860 m	MPC · JPL
709951	2013 JR_{67}	—	May 1, 2013	Mount Lemmon	Mount Lemmon Survey	·	1.4 km	MPC · JPL
709952	2013 JC_{68}	—	September 24, 2014	Kitt Peak	Spacewatch	·	560 m	MPC · JPL
709953	2013 JH_{68}	—	June 7, 2015	Mount Lemmon	Mount Lemmon Survey	3:2	4.9 km	MPC · JPL
709954	2013 JO_{69}	—	May 12, 2013	Haleakala	Pan-STARRS 1	·	1.9 km	MPC · JPL
709955	2013 JK_{71}	—	July 28, 2014	Haleakala	Pan-STARRS 1	EOS	1.4 km	MPC · JPL
709956	2013 JR_{72}	—	May 15, 2013	Haleakala	Pan-STARRS 1	EOS	1.7 km	MPC · JPL
709957	2013 JU_{72}	—	June 30, 2014	Haleakala	Pan-STARRS 1	·	1.6 km	MPC · JPL
709958	2013 JY_{72}	—	May 12, 2013	Haleakala	Pan-STARRS 1	·	1.6 km	MPC · JPL
709959	2013 JO_{73}	—	November 17, 2015	Haleakala	Pan-STARRS 1	·	1.4 km	MPC · JPL
709960	2013 JT_{73}	—	April 16, 2018	Haleakala	Pan-STARRS 1	·	1.6 km	MPC · JPL
709961	2013 JD_{75}	—	May 8, 2013	Haleakala	Pan-STARRS 1	·	1.3 km	MPC · JPL
709962	2013 JN_{76}	—	November 3, 2010	Kitt Peak	Spacewatch	·	2.1 km	MPC · JPL
709963	2013 JW_{79}	—	May 8, 2013	Haleakala	Pan-STARRS 1	·	920 m	MPC · JPL
709964	2013 JG_{81}	—	May 5, 2013	Haleakala	Pan-STARRS 1	AGN	940 m	MPC · JPL
709965	2013 JR_{83}	—	April 1, 2024	Haleakala	Pan-STARRS 2	·	2.0 km	MPC · JPL
709966	2013 JB_{85}	—	May 9, 2013	Haleakala	Pan-STARRS 1	·	1.9 km	MPC · JPL
709967	2013 KH_{3}	—	May 21, 2013	Mount Lemmon	Mount Lemmon Survey	T_{j} (2.95)	4.5 km	MPC · JPL
709968	2013 KL_{4}	—	January 25, 2009	Kitt Peak	Spacewatch	·	850 m	MPC · JPL
709969	2013 KD_{7}	—	January 3, 2012	Mount Lemmon	Mount Lemmon Survey	·	1.9 km	MPC · JPL
709970	2013 KD_{12}	—	May 16, 2013	Mount Lemmon	Mount Lemmon Survey	EOS	2.0 km	MPC · JPL
709971	2013 KE_{12}	—	May 16, 2013	Haleakala	Pan-STARRS 1	·	690 m	MPC · JPL
709972	2013 KE_{15}	—	February 25, 2007	Mount Lemmon	Mount Lemmon Survey	·	2.0 km	MPC · JPL
709973	2013 KL_{16}	—	January 26, 2012	Haleakala	Pan-STARRS 1	·	900 m	MPC · JPL
709974	2013 KB_{19}	—	May 3, 2013	Mount Lemmon	Mount Lemmon Survey	·	1.4 km	MPC · JPL
709975	2013 KJ_{19}	—	May 30, 2013	Mount Lemmon	Mount Lemmon Survey	EOS	1.7 km	MPC · JPL
709976	2013 KQ_{19}	—	May 31, 2013	Mount Lemmon	Mount Lemmon Survey	·	560 m	MPC · JPL
709977	2013 KT_{20}	—	May 31, 2013	Kitt Peak	Spacewatch	·	2.1 km	MPC · JPL
709978	2013 KW_{20}	—	May 16, 2013	Mount Lemmon	Mount Lemmon Survey	·	1 km	MPC · JPL
709979	2013 KP_{22}	—	May 16, 2013	Mount Lemmon	Mount Lemmon Survey	·	2.5 km	MPC · JPL
709980	2013 LX_{1}	—	June 4, 2013	Mount Lemmon	Mount Lemmon Survey	H	420 m	MPC · JPL
709981	2013 LM_{2}	—	April 21, 2013	Mount Lemmon	Mount Lemmon Survey	·	570 m	MPC · JPL
709982	2013 LT_{4}	—	June 3, 2013	Kitt Peak	Spacewatch	·	740 m	MPC · JPL
709983	2013 LS_{6}	—	September 12, 2007	Catalina	CSS	·	590 m	MPC · JPL
709984	2013 LN_{10}	—	May 16, 2013	Mount Lemmon	Mount Lemmon Survey	·	730 m	MPC · JPL
709985	2013 LQ_{12}	—	March 15, 2012	Mount Lemmon	Mount Lemmon Survey	·	2.1 km	MPC · JPL
709986	2013 LC_{15}	—	August 29, 2006	Catalina	CSS	·	840 m	MPC · JPL
709987	2013 LZ_{16}	—	May 24, 2001	Cerro Tololo	Deep Ecliptic Survey	·	990 m	MPC · JPL
709988	2013 LV_{18}	—	October 18, 2009	Mount Lemmon	Mount Lemmon Survey	·	1.7 km	MPC · JPL
709989	2013 LQ_{24}	—	May 12, 2013	Mount Lemmon	Mount Lemmon Survey	·	2.5 km	MPC · JPL
709990	2013 LC_{26}	—	May 16, 2013	Haleakala	Pan-STARRS 1	·	820 m	MPC · JPL
709991	2013 LW_{27}	—	June 7, 2013	Haleakala	Pan-STARRS 1	EOS	1.5 km	MPC · JPL
709992	2013 LW_{28}	—	June 12, 2013	Mount Lemmon	Mount Lemmon Survey	APO	580 m	MPC · JPL
709993	2013 LV_{29}	—	January 19, 2012	Kitt Peak	Spacewatch	·	1.9 km	MPC · JPL
709994	2013 LF_{32}	—	May 15, 2013	Haleakala	Pan-STARRS 1	·	1.9 km	MPC · JPL
709995	2013 LH_{33}	—	June 6, 2013	Nogales	M. Schwartz, P. R. Holvorcem	·	2.1 km	MPC · JPL
709996	2013 LC_{34}	—	June 1, 2013	Nogales	M. Schwartz, P. R. Holvorcem	·	690 m	MPC · JPL
709997	2013 LD_{35}	—	October 12, 2009	Mount Lemmon	Mount Lemmon Survey	·	2.7 km	MPC · JPL
709998	2013 LF_{36}	—	December 11, 2009	Mount Lemmon	Mount Lemmon Survey	·	3.1 km	MPC · JPL
709999	2013 LN_{36}	—	July 29, 2005	Palomar	NEAT	·	1.2 km	MPC · JPL
710000	2013 LE_{37}	—	June 8, 2013	Mount Lemmon	Mount Lemmon Survey	·	1.7 km	MPC · JPL

back to top

== Meaning of names ==
As minor planet discoveries are confirmed, they are given a permanent number by the IAU's Minor Planet Center (MPC), and the discoverers can then submit names for them, following the IAU's naming conventions. The list below concerns those minor planets in the specified number-range that have received names, and explains the meanings of those names.

Official naming citations of newly named small Solar System bodies are approved and published in a bulletin by IAU's Working Group for Small Bodies Nomenclature (WGSBN). Before May 2021, citations were published in MPC's Minor Planet Circulars for many decades. Recent citations can also be found on the JPL Small-Body Database (SBDB). Until his death in 2016, German astronomer Lutz D. Schmadel compiled these citations into the Dictionary of Minor Planet Names (DMP) and regularly updated the collection.

Based on Paul Herget's The Names of the Minor Planets, Schmadel also researched the unclear origin of numerous asteroids, most of which had been named prior to World War II. This article incorporates text from this source, which is in the public domain: SBDB New namings may only be added to this list below after official publication as the preannouncement of names is condemned. The WGSBN publishes a comprehensive guideline for the naming rules of non-cometary small Solar System bodies.

Named minor planet	Provisional	This minor planet was named for...	Ref · Catalog
709193 Concettafinardi	2012 VF_{94}	Sister Concetta (Lucia) Finardi (1896–1975), one of the four nuns who from 1917 to 1921 catalogued the 500 000 stars in the Vatican zone of the Carte du Ciel star atlas.	IAU · 709193
709844 Komoniecki	2013 GS_{155}	Andrzej Komoniecki, Polish chronicler who was the mayor of Żywiec and author of the Chronografia albo Dziejopis Żywiecki.	IAU · 709844
